= Los pulpos =

- Theatrical release poster
- Directed by: Carlos Hugo Christensen
- Screenplay by: César Tiempo
- Based on: Los pulpos (1924) by Marcelo Peyret
- Starring: Olga Zubarry; Roberto Escalada
- Cinematography: Alfredo Traverso
- Edited by: Antonio Rampoldi
- Music by: George Andreani
- Production company: Lumiton
- Release date: 17 March 1948 (Buenos Aires)
- Running time: 80 minutes
- Country: Argentina
- Language: Spanish

Los pulpos (lit."The Octopuses" in English) is a 1948 Argentine melodrama film directed by Carlos Hugo Christensen and starring Olga Zubarry and Roberto Escalada. It was produced by the studio Lumiton during the classical-industrial period of Argentine cinema. Based on Marcelo Peyret's 1924 novel of the same name, with adapted screenplay by César Tiempo, the film tells the story of a writer from Buenos Aires who falls in love with a young, provincial woman through correspondence and then enters into an unhealthy relationship with her when she moves to the city.

The film premiered on 17 March 1948 at the Metropolitan cinema in Buenos Aires and was a commercial success. In Los pulpos, Christensen returned to a style he had introduced in Safo, historia de una pasión (1943) and continued in El ángel desnudo (1946), characterized by its somber atmosphere and its pioneering incorporation of plots with strong erotic content.

Inspired by Italian neorealism, Los pulpos was shot on location in Buenos Aires and incorporated the use of handheld Arriflex cameras, a novelty for the Argentine film industry. The film has been analyzed as an example of the film noir that developed in Latin America in the 1940s and 1950s, which, according to Fernando Martín Peña, was defined in Argentina by its fusion with melodrama. Although it is not as well known as some of Christensen's other works, Los pulpos is sometimes described as his masterpiece. In the 20th century, the depictions of forbidden desire in his films have also been revalued by critics as veiled references to homosexual desire.

== Plot ==
Roberto Escalada and Olga Zubarry in a scene of Los pulpos.

Horacio Pizarro, a writer from Buenos Aires, falls in love with Myrtha, a young, provincial woman who admires him, through their correspondence. At the newspaper office where he works, his friend and senior colleague Maldonado advises him not to get distracted by women and to prioritize his health by taking time off to recover from his extreme fatigue. At the Retiro station, Horacio meets Myrtha and her cousin, Elisa. The young woman refuses to let Horacio accompany them to their place or to reveal their address.

Myrtha stops by Horacio's workplace and tells him she is on her way out to try on a dress. Horacio follows her until he sees her go into a fur store. He meets Myrtha and her cousin at the Ópera cinema that night, where he confronts her about treating him like a stranger, and she confesses that she works at a fur shop and lives upstairs with the owner, who is a family friend. After the screening, the young women introduce him to the owner Pola, an older, seductive woman whom he finds distasteful.

Horacio takes Myrtha to see a classical music performance at the Teatro Colón, where the young woman wears a luxurious fur coat that she says Pola lent her. Horacio begins a passionate romance with her, and they go out to seedy bars that she finds appealing. The excessive nightlife and tobacco use—despite his persistent cough—begin to take a toll on Horacio.

Olga Zubarry in a scene of Los pulpos.

At Myrtha's place, Pola tells Horacio that the young woman's fur coat was a gift from a man and tells him to ask her why she had to leave her hometown. Before leaving the fur shop, Horacio sees Myrtha at the door saying goodbye to a man and kissing him on the lips. Under the rain, Horacio tells Myrtha that their relationship is over. Exhausted by his cough, Horacio collapses when he gets home and spends three weeks in bed, seriously ill with a lung condition. Later, while he is writing a play titled Los pulpos, he is visited by Myrtha, who assures him that her infidelity did not go any further than the kiss he witnessed, and he forgives her.

Myrtha calls Horacio while looking at haute couture designs and lies to him, saying she has a lot of work and will not be able to meet him. Later, while trying on headpieces, she receives a call from another man, Julio, and tells him she will meet him after having tea with a friend. Horacio meets Myrtha at a café and confronts her about not coming to his apartment last night. She replies that she had to work late. As they say goodbye, Horacio secretly follows her until he sees her enter a building. From a shop across the street, he makes a phone call and is answered by Pola, who tells him that since he and Myrtha broke up, she has been living with a man named Julio Arenales. Shocked, Horacio runs to the building and bursts into the apartment, where he discovers Myrtha in her nightgown, who covers her face as he runs out.

Franco, an actor and the director of his theater company, was impressed by Horacio's play Los pulpos. On the night of the premiere at the Teatro Cervantes, when Horacio expresses embarrassment at how haggard he looks, Franco applies makeup and makes him look as young as he used to. In the final scene, Franco, playing Horacio, tells a fictionalized version of Myrtha how doomed their love is before committing suicide. The play is a hit, but Horacio ignores Myrtha, who is waiting for him outside the theater. When he arrives at his apartment, Horacio finds Myrtha inside, waiting to ask for his forgiveness. Although he rejects her, Myrtha leaves her keys and tells him she will wait for him that night. When Myrtha leaves, Horacio washes his face and is horrified when he sees his worn-out appearance again without makeup. He arrives at Myrtha's address and, overcome by a cough and exhaustion, climbs the stairs to the top floor but collapses and dies upon reaching the door.

== Cast ==
- Olga Zubarry as Myrtha
- Roberto Escalada as Horacio Pizarro
- Nicolás Fregues as Saúl Maldonado
- Carlos Thompson as Roca
- Beba Bidart as Pola
- Ivonne Lescaut as Elisa
- Mabel Dorán
- Arturo Gonzálvez

== Production and style ==
A lobby card of Los pulpos, featuring a street scene with Roberto Escalada and Olga Zubarry facing each other. The film was shot on location in Buenos Aires, drawing on Italian neorealism

Los pulpos (lit."The Octopuses" in English), subtitled on posters as Historia de un amor desesperado ("A Story of Desperate Love"), was the second release of 1948 by Lumiton, one of the leading film studios during the classical-industrial period of Argentine cinema. The film has been regarded as the conclusion of a trilogy that began with Safo, historia de una pasión (1943) and continued with El ángel desnudo (1946), also from Lumiton, in which director Carlos Hugo Christensen explored unhealthy, passionate relationships. Christensen is generally considered the pioneer of erotic cinema in Argentina for incorporating highly sexually-charged themes into his melodramas, which—though moderate by later standards—were considered ahead of their time. Safo was the first film in this style and marked the beginning of a new phase in his career, during which he alternated between racy comedies and erotic melodramas—the latter category including El angel desnudo and Los pulpos, which consolidated the director's reputation as the enfant terrible of the industry. These three films can also be considered part of a broader trend in Christensen's filmography that also began with Safo, which includes films in which he explores dark and paranoid themes, such as La muerte camina en la lluvia (1948), La trampa (1949), No abras nunca esa puerta, Si muero antes de despertar (both 1952), and Armiño negro (1953).

The film is based on the Argentine novel Los pulpos (1924) by Marcelo Peyret, a writer of popular, inexpensive weekly publications in the 1920s who has since been largely forgotten, and who uses the metaphor of the "octopus" as an irrational force that traps and suffocates its victim. The adapted screenplay was written by Christensen's frequent collaborator, César Tiempo. To play the film's lead couple, Christensen cast Olga Zubarry and Roberto Escalada, actors he had previously launched as leads in El ángel desnudo and Safo, respectively. As noted by Gustavo C. Castagna, Los pulpos "is told from the protagonist's perspective (...), taking into account his artistic and emotional ramblings, in which the director emphasizes the protagonist's suffering and the moral condemnation of his unfaithful girlfriend." The film is notable for incorporating the influence of the European post-war cinema from the era, including Italian neorealism, by location shooting in well-known cafes, streets and establishments in Buenos Aires. The shoot also incorporated Arriflex hand-held cameras—a novelty for the Argentine film industry—operated by Aníbal González Paz.

Los pulpos is considered one of the prime examples of the unique film noir style that emerged in Argentine cinema in the 1940s and 1950s, a style characterized by its fusion with the melodrama genre. Analyzing it alongside Los verdes paraísos (1947), Fernando Martín Peña wrote that "neither film features any crimes—not even misdemeanors—but their protagonists experience their eccentric adventures with the anxiety of someone caught up in a dense, suspenseful plot, and that is exactly how Christensen films them, adopting the tense and deeply subjective perspective of his characters." In The Routledge Companion to Latin American Cinema, Alejandro Kelly Hopfenblatt and Silvana Flores included Christensen among the directors in the region who "specialized in urban settings, stylizing cityscapes through the tension between noir expressionism and the later influence of Italian neorealism". They also noted Los pulpos as an example of Latin American film noir and wrote that Alfredo Traverso's cinematoraphy turned Buenos Aires into a "[city] of shadows and slanted lights that trapped [its] protagonists."

== Release and reception ==
Los pulpos premiered on 17 March 1948 at the Metropolitan cinema in Buenos Aires and was rated as unsuitable for viewers under 18. A few days before the premiere, the Rosario newspaper Crónica noted that with Los pulpos, Christensen "reaffirms his great talent as a director" and observed that "he is once again directing a work of great dramatic intensity, much like his fondly remembered hits Safo and El ángel desnudo—which were, in fact, the cornerstones of his artistic reputation."

The review in newspaper La Razón considered Zubarry's role unsuitable for her and noted the "concise and expressive dialogue" of César Tiempo's screenplay. The newspaper Noticias Gráficas stated that "the city plays a role of singular importance." In May 1948, a Buenos Aires correspondent for the Chilean newspaper La Nación described Los pulpos as "one of the most solid commercial successes of recent times."

In Historia del cine argentino (1960), Domingo Di Núbila named Los pulpos among the 1948 films that helped bring a considerable audience back to Argentine cinema in the domestic market, though only "to a certain extent" and less so than bigger hits like Dios se lo pague, Pelota de trapo and Historia de una mala mujer.

== Legacy ==
According to Raúl Manrupe and María Alejandra Portela, although Los pulpos is not as well known as some of Christensen's other films, it is considered by some to be his best work. Peña described it in 2012 as "perhaps his masterpiece because of the way it depicts a destructive exaltation that pushes the boundaries of the fantastic while maintaining a realistic appearance." He later wrote:

Bram Stoker cemented the myth of vampirism, but just a couple of decades later, in Argentina, the writer Marcelo Peyret invented pulpismo: young, irresistible women who, while having sex with feverish men, reveal their tentacles and suction cups and drain their energy, health, and ultimately their lives. Twenty years after the novel's publication, Christensen filmed it as if there were no tomorrow, in a style that almost miraculously combines the artifice of the subject matter with the abundant use of real locations in the city of Buenos Aires. Without detracting from other formidable women in Argentine cinema, Christensen found in Olga Zubarry the absolute, irrational, and definitive femme fatale—as much a part of desire itself as desire itself. To date, Argentine cinema has not revisited pulpismo, and only one mad Pole, Żuławski—filming half in France and half in Germany—famously produced something resembling it in Possession. But it wasn't enough. Pulpismo still awaits more deranged works of fiction to attain mythical stature.

Los pulpos, along with Safo, historia de una pasión (1943) and El ángel desnudo (1946), is regarded by critics as part of the body of work that made Christensen a pioneer of Argentine erotic cinema. In the 21st century, his work has also been reevaluated for its veiled references to homoeroticism, which scholars have linked to the director's own homosexuality.

== See also ==
- List of Argentine films of 1948
- List of film noir titles
- List of melodrama films

== Bibliography ==
- D'Lugo, Marvin; López, Ana M.; Podalsky, Laura, eds. (2018). The Routledge Companion to Latin American Cinema. London; New York: Routledge. Taylor & Francis Group. ISBN 978-1-315-72044-9.
- Di Núbila, Domingo (1960). Historia del cine argentino. Tomo II (in Spanish). Buenos Aires: Cruz de Malta.
- Fabbro, Gabriela (2024). Lumiton. El sello que marcó el rumbo del cine nacional (in Spanish). Vicente López: Archivo Lumiton. ISBN 978-987-261-511-6.
- Manrupe, Raúl; Portela, María Alejandra (2001). Un diccionario de films argentinos (1930-1995) (in Spanish). Buenos Aires: Corregidor. ISBN 950-05-0896-6 – via Internet Archive.
- Peña, Fernando Martín (2012). Cien años de cine argentino (eBook) (in Spanish). Buenos Aires: Editorial Biblos. ISBN 978-987-691-098-9.
