= Safo, historia de una pasión =

1943 Argentine film

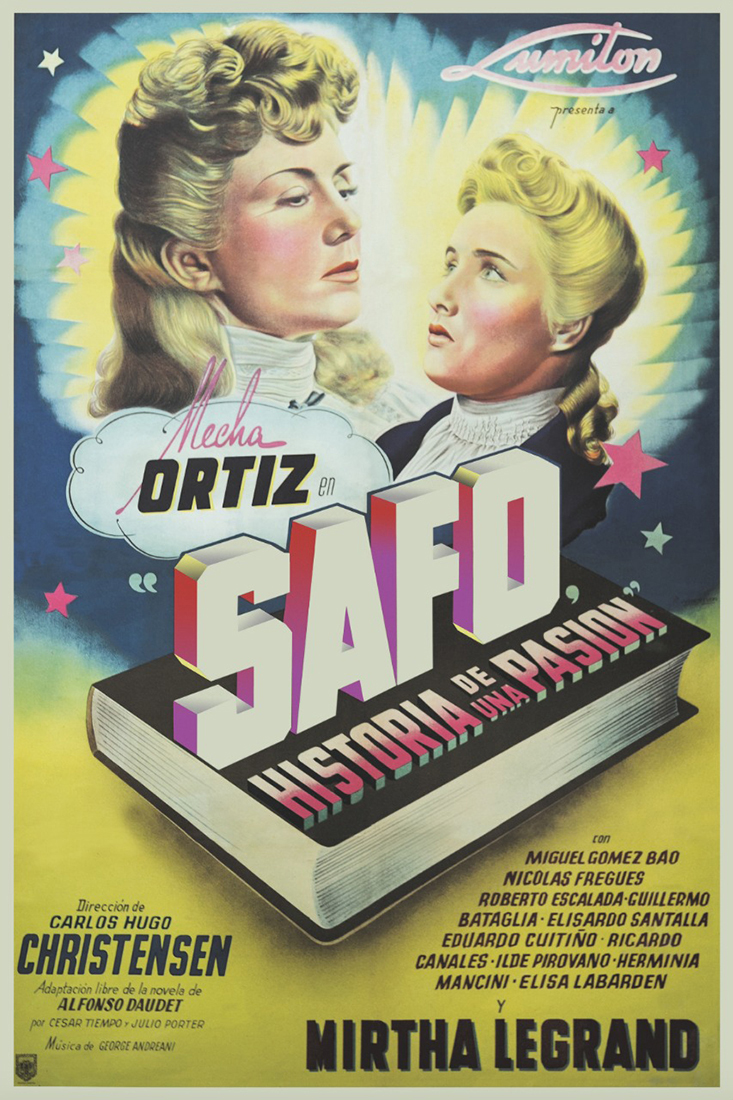
- Theatrical release poster
- Directed by: Carlos Hugo Christensen
- Screenplay by: César Tiempo; Julio Porter
- Based on: Sappho (1884) by Alphonse Daudet
- Starring: Mecha Ortiz; Roberto Escalada; Mirtha Legrand
- Cinematography: Alfredo Traverso
- Edited by: Antonio Rampoldi
- Music by: George Andreani
- Production company: Lumiton
- Release date: September 17, 1943
- Running time: 98 minutes
- Country: Argentina
- Language: Spanish

Safo, historia de una pasión (English: Sappho, Story of a Passion) is a 1943 Argentine melodrama film directed by Carlos Hugo Christensen, starring Mecha Ortiz and produced by the Lumiton studio during the classical period of Argentine cinema. It is based on the French novel Sappho (1884) by Alphonse Daudet, with an adapted screenplay by César Tiempo and Julio Porter. The story was chosen specifically with Ortiz in mind as the lead; she plays a mysterious woman of the night who seduces a shy young provincial man, many years her junior, newly arrived in the Buenos Aires of 1914. The chosen leading man was the then-unknown Roberto Escalada, and the film's love triangle was completed by the young Mirtha Legrand, who accepted a minor role despite already being established as a leading star. Within the local star system, the film cast each actress in her signature type, with Ortiz as the femme fatale and Legrand as the adolescent ingénue.

The film's strong erotic content, though mild by today's standards, was considered daring for the time, since Argentine cinema had not until then been characterized by its treatment of romantic passion, and it broke with the prevailing mold of films led by young ingénues. For this reason, Safo is often recognized as the film that launched erotic cinema in Argentina. The film ran into trouble with censorship from the shoot until shortly before its premiere, one of its posters was banned, and it became one of the first national films banned for viewers under 16. Safo received critical acclaim and was a resounding commercial success in Argentina and in other Latin American countries, cemented Christensen's reputation as a director, Ortiz as a great diva, and Escalada as a sought-after leading man within the industry. The Argentine Film Critics Association awarded Ortiz the prize for Best Actress for her work in the film.

Considered one of Argentina's cult films, Safo is recognized as a classic of national cinema and one of the key works in Christensen's filmography, and it introduced a line of erotic melodramas that would continue with titles such as El ángel desnudo (1946) and Los pulpos (1948). It has been especially valued by Argentine gay male culture, which saw in it veiled representations of Christensen's own homosexuality, and it turned Ortiz into one of the country's first gay icons. The "spider-woman" figure of Ortiz's character was the image that inspired Manuel Puig's novel Kiss of the Spider Woman (1976). After a fire at the Alex Laboratories in 1969, the film was not seen again in its original length for decades, which heightened its mythical status. In a survey of the 100 greatest films of Argentine cinema conducted by the Museo del Cine Pablo Ducrós Hicken in 2000, it was ranked 43rd.

== Plot ==
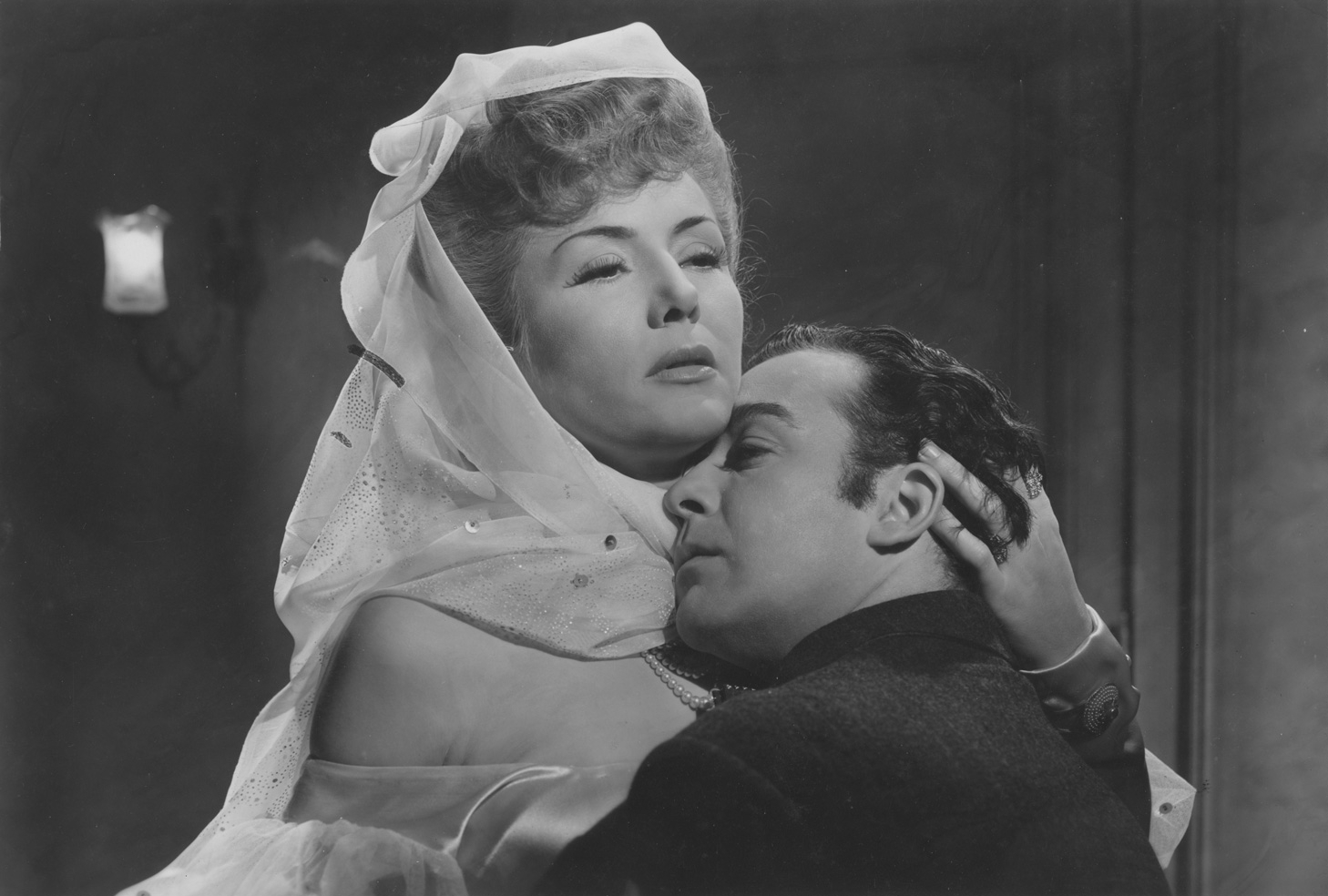
Selva (Mecha Ortiz) and Raúl (Roberto Escalada) on the night they meet.

In 1914, in a town in Mendoza, the young Raúl—who dreams of becoming a consul—receives news of an appointment in Buenos Aires thanks to the friendship between his uncle, Silvino, and the influential Doctor Benavídez. Raúl decides to leave that very night: he says goodbye to his parents and to Teresa, his uncle's young wife, and travels with his uncle to Buenos Aires, where they arrive in the midst of the Carnival celebrations. After settling into the boarding house, Raúl and Silvino attend a party at the home of the wealthy Delavalle, where the young man is seduced by a much older and very forward woman. Raúl takes her to his apartment and, with great effort, carries her in his arms up several flights of stairs, while a voice-over warns that their relationship would be as difficult as that climb. After spending the night together, Raúl wakes up and the woman is already gone, though she has left him a card with her name and contact information: Selva Moreno.

That same afternoon, before Silvino returns to Mendoza, the two visit Doctor Benavídez, where they meet his young and naive daughter, Irene, who recognizes Raúl from when, as a little girl, she used to visit her grandmother, a neighbor from his same town. After a dinner in which Raúl and Irene show mutual interest, the group accompanies Silvino to the train station, and Benavídez and Irene drop Raúl off at his boarding house. Upon entering his apartment, Raúl finds Selva sitting there, waiting for him, and neither of them can resist the passion they feel for one another.

Mecha Ortiz and Roberto Escalada in a scene from Safo, historia de una pasión.

Selva and Raúl begin a passionate romance. One day, while they are together, they run into the sculptor Caudal, author of a well-known statue of a nude woman representing the Greek poet Sappho. Caudal claims to be an old friend of Selva's and complains that she no longer goes out as much. In Selva's luxurious apartment, where she lives with her maid—nicknamed Langosta—hang paintings of nudes dedicated to her and a reproduction of the statue of Sappho. While they are lying down, Selva leaves the bedroom to receive a man who arrives unexpectedly, and Raúl overhears the man reproaching her for everything he gave her and begging her to be together again. Offended, Raúl tells Selva that they are over and leaves her.

In the following days, Selva lingers at the entrance of Raúl's workplace and sends him a letter telling him that she will keep waiting for him because she needs him. At a dinner at the Benavídez home, Raúl meets Molina, author of a book of poems titled Selva that is one of his favorite books, and deepens his courtship of Irene. Arriving at his apartment feeling unwell, he again finds Selva sitting at the door, waiting for him. Raúl has a high fever and she helps him: she puts him to bed and cares for him while he is delirious and calls out Teresa's name in his sleep. Once recovered, Raúl discovers that Selva sold her belongings to pay for the doctor's visit and, moved by her devotion during his illness, gives himself over to her again. As they kiss, Irene arrives at Raúl's home and leaves horrified upon seeing a pair of women's shoes on the floor, suggesting that he is sleeping with Selva.

From left to right: Raúl (Escalada) alongside Delavalle (Ricardo Canales), Molina (Eduardo Cuitiño) and Caudal (Guillermo Battaglia), who reveal Selva's disreputable past to him.

Selva and Raúl deepen their relationship and move to a secluded house, accompanied by Langosta, so they can be alone and live out their love freely. At work, Benavídez asks Raúl whether there was a falling-out with Irene, since he saw her very distressed and decided to send her to Mendoza to clear her head; Raúl also turns down an invitation to discuss his professional future in order to return to Selva. On the way home, Raúl enters a bar to buy cigarettes for Selva and runs into Caudal, who invites him to sit with him, Delavalle and Molina. The men reveal that they all had a relationship with Selva—whom they nickname "Safo"—and tell Raúl about her reputation as a man-devouring woman who takes advantage of men, and that she was the model for the nude statue. They also tell him her story with the draftsman Carbone, which caused a scandal at the time: he counterfeited money to give it to her and ended up six years in prison. Dismayed, Raúl returns to the house, confronts Selva with her past, burns her love letters, and leaves her.

Raúl returns to Mendoza in search of Irene, with whom he begins a romance. While there, he receives a telegram from Doctor Benavídez offering him the consulate of Liverpool, but he announces that he will ask to postpone it so he can ask for Irene's hand in marriage. He also receives a letter from Selva, which he tears up without opening. Back in Buenos Aires, Raúl obtains Benavídez's blessing to marry Irene and later runs into Molina, who tells him that Selva is living in poverty and has refused financial help. Raúl goes to look for her and finds her working as a maid in a large house. Selva tells him she knew he would return and that their little house is waiting for them; Raúl offers her help in the name of the happy days they shared, but tells her that he is going to marry and that their affair will not happen again. He also tells her that he will come back to collect the correspondence he had left at the house.

Raúl goes with Benavídez to meet Irene at the train station, where Benavídez tells them that he arranged for someone else to take the consulate offer and that Raúl would keep an important post at the ministry. Raúl says goodbye to Irene and tells her he must attend to one last thing before they continue together. He heads to the house he shared with Selva, from which he sees a male figure leaving. Selva confesses that the man is Carbone, who has just regained his freedom. Raúl and Selva argue and he goes so far as to slap her, but both end up surrendering to the passion they feel and kiss. Once again taken over by his romance with Selva, Raúl decides to call off his marriage in order to go far away with her.

The following morning, he goes to Benavídez's home and confesses that there is another woman in his life and that he wants the post in Liverpool so he can leave the country. Benavídez takes offense, reproaches him for having toyed with Irene's feelings to obtain a promotion, and warns him that, if he leaves, he will be dead to them. Raúl leaves and, before going out, runs into Irene, who lets him go in tears. Upon returning to Selva's house, he does not find her: in her place he finds a letter beside the statue of Sappho, in which she explains that she decided to leave with Carbone. Selva concludes that her peace lies with Carbone and not with a young man like him, who has his whole life ahead of him and does not deserve to be tied to a figure like her.

== Cast ==
- Mecha Ortiz as Selva Moreno
- Roberto Escalada as Raúl de Salcedo
- Mirtha Legrand as Irene
- Ilde Pirovano as Gertrudis
- Elisa Labardén as Teresa
- Elisardo Santalla as Don Raimundo
- Miguel Gómez Bao as Silvino
- Ricardo Canales as Delavalle
- Nicolás Fregues as Benavídez
- Guillermo Battaglia as Caudal
- Herminia Mancini as Langosta
- Eduardo Cuitiño as Molina

== Themes and style ==
Mecha Ortiz in a scene from Safo, historia de una pasión. The spider web is a recurring visual metaphor in the film.

Safo, historia de una pasión falls within the film genre of melodrama, the dominant style during the Golden Age of Argentine cinema, but with the novelty of introducing a subject matter of strong erotic content that—though mild by today's standards and without sex scenes or nudity—was considered bold and transgressive for the time. For this reason, it is historically regarded as the film that launched erotic cinema in Argentina. Safo premiered at a time when one style of classical Argentine cinema, though still dominant, was showing signs of exhaustion: that of films led by young, virginal ingénues, set in bourgeois environments and headed by new adolescent stars such as Mirtha Legrand or María Duval. Carlos Hugo Christensen became a pioneer in challenging the so-called "cinema of ingénues", both with Safo and with Dieciséis años, released that same year: in them he placed Legrand and Duval, the two most representative figures of the genre, in plots with a strong sexual charge. Christensen continued this "erotic melodrama" style with films such as El ángel desnudo (1946) and Los pulpos (1948), which consolidated his reputation as the enfant terrible of the industry.

"When I started making films there was one thing that troubled me: if the characters kissed or said 'I love you' to each other, the audience laughed. I even remember a film in which the couple had to kiss at the end, and the director came up with a really strange shot in which the characters hid behind a tree to kiss, so that the kiss couldn't be seen and thus the laughter in the theater was avoided. That stuck with me, and in 1943 I decided to make Safo, historia de una pasión, which from beginning to end was kisses, kisses, as befits a proper romance. (...) That film was a scandal for its time, because with Safo the whole story that in national cinema you couldn't say 'I love you' came to an end. And I had made it with every intention of putting an end to that issue that love couldn't be shown on screen."

— Carlos Hugo Christensen, 1995.

Safo opened a second stage in Christensen's filmography, characterized by an increasingly refined and sophisticated handling of technical aspects, in which he alternated mainly between two formats. On one hand, the line of melodramas in which he explored eroticism—considered ahead of its time—generally with Ortiz as the lead; on the other, romantic comedies that prolonged the first phase of his work, though with a less naive tone, usually starring Legrand. According to Alejo Janín, Christensen's filmography presents "two faces: the bright one, which allowed him to direct those light comedies, and the dark one, which tinged several of his most acclaimed films with paranoia and gloom. Like the moon, the dark side is the least visible and, at the same time, the most fascinating (...) inaugurated by Safo, historia de una pasión, and continued by El ángel desnudo (1946), La muerte camina en la lluvia, Los pulpos (1948), [La trampa (1949)], Armiño negro (1953), No abras nunca esa puerta (1952) and Si muero antes de despertar (1952)." Raúl Manrupe and María Alejandra Portela noted that Safo brings together its director's "favorite elements: morbid passions, gloomy settings, and an omnipresent spider-web set design to underscore the fate that traps the protagonists."

According to Soledad Pardo and Pablo Croci, Safo sits in the tension between the melodramatic canon and its transgression. The film systematically opposes its spaces and characters: to the daytime, luminous, and bourgeois world of Irene and the Mendoza countryside—associated with morality and family—is contrasted the nocturnal and oppressive universe of Selva, linked to the city, eroticism, and perdition. Within this structure, the exemplary punishment functions as the melodramatic trait that imposes a limit on eroticism: Raúl's desire is presented as sinful and must be atoned for. The film's peculiarity lies in the fact that this punishment does not fall on the transgressive woman, as is usual in the genre, but on Raúl, who loses both Selva and Irene and is left alone, with no opportunity for redemption. For Claudio España, Safo founds the model of the "mother-prostitute" and "builds the image of the woman who with her sensuality enchants men until she weakens them and turns them into wrecks." Safo has also been noted as a particular case within classical Argentine cinema for inverting the usual gender roles, since it is Ortiz's character who takes the initiative in the courtship and who dominates the relationship with the man. Throughout the film, the image of the spider web is used repeatedly as a symbol of the trap of passion into which the characters fall.

== Production ==
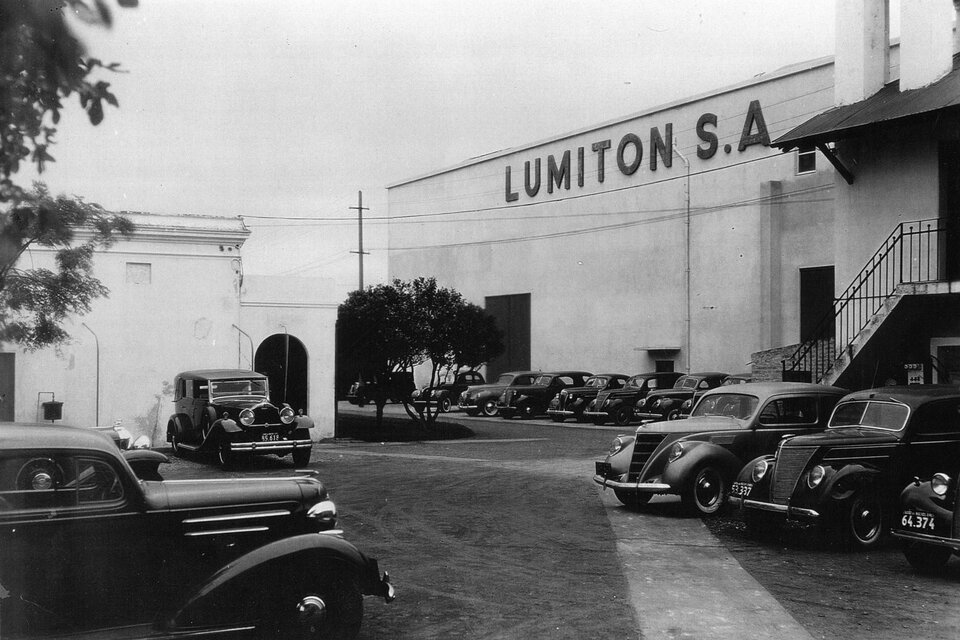
View of the Lumiton studios in Munro, Greater Buenos Aires, where the film was shot.

Christensen made his directorial debut in 1940—at the height of the Golden Age of Argentine cinema—with the film El inglés de los güesos, becoming one of the youngest directors in the local industry, at just over twenty years of age. He had come to the Lumiton studio through one of its founders, César José Guerrico, who met him at Radio Splendid—where the young man had had success with a radio drama series—and brought him to the studio. Before his launch as a director, Christensen worked on the filming of Así es la vida (1939), by Francisco Mugica. Christensen brought to Lumiton a more cultured style, of greater formal and literary sophistication, which had its counterpart at the same time at the rival studio Argentina Sono Film with the incorporation of directors Luis Saslavsky and Alberto de Zavalía. After the great failure of Águila blanca (1941), Christensen resumed the line traced by Mugica with Locos de verano and, above all, with Los chicos crecen (both from 1942), the latter one of the studio's greatest successes.

Christensen chose to adapt the French novel Sappho (1884) by Alphonse Daudet—with a screenplay by César Tiempo and Julio Porter—after Guerrico suggested he look for a plot for Mecha Ortiz. The actress had entered film when she was over thirty, at a time when very young actresses in ingénue roles predominated. With an aristocratic image, she had been specializing—within the local star system—in roles of mysterious and refined women, close to the femme fatale archetype of film noir, through her participation in films such as Los muchachos de antes no usaban gomina (1936) or Margarita, Armando y su padre (1939). Ortiz, who had already seen a stage adaptation of the work and who had previously declined Christensen's invitation to appear in Los chicos crecen, accepted the role on the condition that it be done in good taste. The announcement of the adaptation caused controversy and threats of censorship from the start. Ortiz herself wrote decades later: "At times I felt very bad. I seemed to be complicit in something sinful; they exaggerated so much that at moments I even doubted whether I was filming something pornographic. No. I was sure I was making a film with class."

Roberto Escalada during location shooting of Safo, historia de una pasión in Potrerillos, Mendoza.

The leading man's role required a young actor who could pass for much younger than Ortiz, and no established name fit that profile, so it ultimately fell to Roberto Escalada, practically unknown in film, who at the time worked on a successful radio program. Years later, Escalada recalled his casting and arrival at the shoot of Safo:

"I had gone to see the premiere of Con el dedo en el gatillo, a Sono Film picture. I was walking along Corrientes (...) and a young fellow runs after me and says: 'Escalada, forgive me. I'm going to make a film and I want you to play a part. Go talk to the manager Julio Lofiego at Lumiton and tell him I sent you.' It was for the Santos Telmo role in El inglés de los güesos. I speak with Lofiego, who tells me: 'For this part there are 500 pesos.' I say: 'No, that's very little!' He replied: 'For that price I have Pedro Maratea.' I answered: 'I think Maratea suits you better, because last night I was at the premiere of Con el dedo en el gatillo and he's magnificent. Good afternoon!' And Maratea did it and he was very good. Time passed. (...) One day I go into a cigar shop on Corrientes street (...) and a young man appeared, Carlos Hugo Christensen, in whom Lumiton had great hopes: they had just signed him for five years. (...) I run into him again and he says: 'I'm still thinking of you. I'm going to make El inglés de los güesos and I want you to fill a role.' 'Of course, you have my phone number!' Time passed and the role was played by Tito Alonso. He ran into me again and told me: 'I fought for you, but it couldn't be.' Shortly afterward he called me: 'I want to do a test with you so they can see it at Lumiton, for the leading man of Safo. (...) I want you to do it. You have to go to a test at Lumiton, in Munro.' I had no idea where that was. I found out, I looked for the cheapest way to get there (I had to take two or three things), I got a peso and set off. By looking for the cheapest option, I chose the longest route and arrived ten minutes late, and Christensen had already left. I sat there in the reception, thinking: 'And now how do I get another peso to go back?' Then a very kind gentleman passed by, who knew me, and said: 'What are you doing here?' I told him I had come for a test and explained. And he said: 'If I do the test for you, how does that sound?' I didn't know who he was, but I told him anyway: 'Of course!' He had me made up and they set up a backdrop against a tree; he put in a camera that he operated himself and asked me questions (the test was an interview). (...) and they called me to make the film. The one who tested me was Alfredo Traverso, the film's future lighting director. (...) Traverso remarked to Guerrico: 'Did you see Escalada's test?' 'Forget about Escalada, we need to find a bigger name. Forget about Escalada,' Guerrico replied. 'Look at it, what does it cost you...' (...) after so much insistence, Guerrico watched it and when it ended said: 'Sign him for five years.' So, if I hadn't crossed paths with Traverso, I wouldn't have done Safo and who knows where I'd be."

Mirtha Legrand in a scene from Safo, historia de una pasión.

The film's love triangle was completed with the addition of Legrand, then sixteen years old, who agreed to appear in a minor role despite already being established as a leading star. Toward the end of the title sequence, her participation is highlighted with an unusual card: "Lumiton thanks actress Mirtha Legrand for the courtesy of having accepted the brief role of Irene." Decades later, Legrand expressed reservations about her participation in Safo:

"I had come from doing several leading roles when Lumiton included me in Safo. I suppose the company cleverly—and this shouldn't sound vain—used my name and the success I had already achieved with my previous films. Of course, it was an ingénue character and I was on that track at the time, so they convinced my mother and my representative, don Ricardo Cerebello: 'It's a good part, we'll look after her, she'll stand out.' Well, in the end 'the girl' did it; but no, if I could go back, I wouldn't do it. It wasn't a character I liked, although it turned out to be an excellent film with a magnificent couple like Mecha Ortiz and Roberto Escalada, but I don't remember it as a pleasant experience, I didn't feel comfortable. What's more, I was extremely young and didn't really know what Safo meant, it sounded to me like something 'improper' that I shouldn't be taking part in. The loves of a tempestuous woman, her lover, in short—consider that I'm talking about many years ago."

Roberto Escalada and technicians during location shooting of Safo, historia de una pasión in Potrerillos, Mendoza.

The team was completed with Pepe Herrero as assistant director, Francisco Oyarzabal on framing, cinematography by Alfredo Traverso, music by George Andreani, set design by Ricardo Conord, and editing by Antonio Rampoldi. During filming, Christensen, Ortiz, and Escalada stayed in a chalet within the grounds of the Lumiton studios, located in Munro, Greater Buenos Aires, and frequented the local restaurant La Cuchara de Palo, an emblematic establishment for the studio's workers. The film's exteriors were shot in Potrerillos, Mendoza Province, scenes in which Ortiz did not take part. According to the actress, the sequence in which Escalada carries her in his arms up several flights took more than ten hours of filming and left him exhausted. Ortiz also wrote in her memoirs about the director's insistence that they be as sensual as possible:

"(...) Christensen drove us crazy, asking for more sensuality, more passion, more heat. Escalada and I did what we could, amid whispers and half-lights. It takes a lot of professionalism to kiss and embrace 'ardently' in front of thirty or forty people who are watching or working under the orders of the director, who would suddenly cut a scene to instruct 'when you kiss her, run your hand over her back and take her by the waist,' or all of a sudden, 'stick your tense fingers into Mecha's hair,' 'push her back.'"

== Release and initial reception ==
One of the film's promotional posters, reportedly censored.

Safo, historia de una pasión premiered on 17 September 1943 at the Broadway Theatre in Buenos Aires, and banned for viewers under 16. The film faced censorship threats and, in order to be released, Christensen included two lines that "toned down" the plot considered too scandalous. On one hand, in the opening credits: "Film version of the masterpiece that Alphonse Daudet dedicated to his sons, and wrote for the moral instruction of the youth of all times." On the other, at the end of the film: "For my sons, when they turn twenty. Signed: Alphonse Daudet." In the 1990s, Christensen noted in an interview that they obtained authorization to exhibit the film only two days before the premiere, and that the original poster was banned. Several authors note that this poster showed Escalada kissing Ortiz's chest. Ortiz, for her part, detailed in her memoirs: "The authorities banned a poster with a photograph of a kiss, a bit daring, but it was permitted to put up another, where a spider web symbolized the trap of passion set by the woman with a past for the young, inexperienced man younger than her."

The film was a great commercial success for the company: it established Ortiz as a great diva, turned the until-then unknown Escalada into a sought-after leading man, and meant the definitive consecration of Christensen as a director, who the previous year had obtained his first great box-office success with Los chicos crecen. The film also gained recognition abroad, especially in Mexico and Brazil, and remained on screens for more than a year in Argentina and in much of Latin America. César José Guerrico, one of the production company's owners, is said to have told Christensen: "Give me two more Safos and I'll turn Lumiton into Hollywood." In Ortiz's words:

"The success was overwhelming and gave all of us great satisfaction, especially the producers. (...) Safo filled theaters all over the country. (...) Abroad it was the same. In Brazil, in Havana, in Mexico, in New York, in Montevideo. Wherever it opened, it swept away and astonished audiences. It was also praised. Editions of the book were published using photos from the film on the cover, both in the country and in Brazil. We received letters from everywhere. They asked us to attend the premieres, to do a tour, to go to a screening, and we were besieged with interviews in newspapers, magazines, and radio."

For his part, Christensen recalled:

"Safo was a success, so, so great, that the same story was filmed in France. In Paris, it premiered almost simultaneously. The French filmmakers acknowledged that the Argentine one was superior, and not very modestly they added, 'your version deserved to be made by us.' (...) Living in Brazil, where the film was an overwhelming success, they proposed three times that I make a new version of Safo. All three times I answered the same thing: 'Bring me a Mecha Ortiz and I'll accept.' There wasn't one. It was impossible."

The critic Calki of El Mundo wrote that Christensen "surpassed all his previous work and placed himself in the front rank with this film," while Roland of Crítica highlighted its "interesting achievements, above all on the visual level." The review in El Heraldo del Cinematografista noted that: "Although, owing to the nature of its subject, the film may prove shocking to puritanical viewers, its sentimental and passionate character makes it especially appealing to the adult female audience." At the awards of the Argentine Film Critics Association (currently known as the Silver Condor Awards), Ortiz received the "prize for best dramatic actress of 1943" for her work in the film. Ortiz also stated that she had received awards for her performance in Havana and in Brazil.

Lumiton attempted to replicate the success of Safo by reuniting the leading pair in El canto del cisne (1945), with a similar storyline, though the film did not obtain good financial results. Safo was re-released on 14 June 1947, with a new print, at the Ambassador cinema. In 1957, Julio Porter—one of the film's screenwriters—presented the sequel La sombra de Safo, which reunited the original cast and includes fragments of Christensen's film as flashbacks.

== Legacy and preservation ==
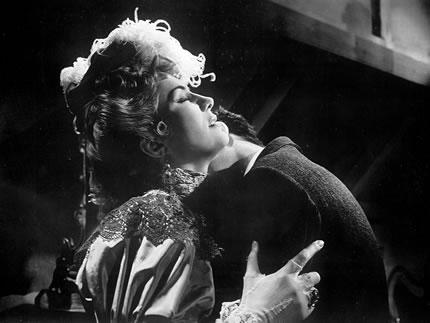
Mecha Ortiz and Roberto Escalada in a scene from Safo, historia de una pasión.

Safo is considered a classic of Argentine cinema, one of the fundamental works in Christensen's filmography, and one of the country's cult films. In a survey of the 100 greatest films of Argentine cinema conducted by the Museo del Cine Pablo Ducrós Hicken in 2000, it was ranked 43rd. The "spider-woman" figure of Ortiz's character was the image that inspired Manuel Puig's novel Kiss of the Spider Woman (1976).

After a fire at the Alex Laboratories in 1969, Safo was considered completely lost. In the 1980s, the discovery of prints made national news: one in a batch of films owned by a Catholic congregation, and another in Mexico City, although neither yet allowed the entire film to be reconstructed. Turned into a mythical title, for decades it could be seen only in versions far removed from its original length. Finally, in 1997 it was screened again for the first time as part of a tribute to Christensen at the Mar del Plata International Film Festival. In 2013, the 28th edition of the same festival screened a 35 mm print obtained from two 16 mm prints, which was part of a large collection of titles from the classical period donated by Turner International to the INCAA. A year later, the collector Fernando Martín Peña presented on his television program a complete print he had found in Uruguay.

The film has had special relevance for the gay male culture of Argentina and turned Ortiz into one of the country's first gay icons. The interactions between Ortiz's character and Escalada's, chiefly the scene in which they meet, have been read as references to gay sociability. Writing for Soy, Ernesto Meccia recounted that, in his interactions with elderly gay men during the 1980s in Buenos Aires, Ortiz was an exalted figure close to the community, and he collected a testimony that told him: "On the street, if you looked the way Mecha looked at Escalada in Safo, you'd draw men's attention, and if you gave the cigarette three taps with your index finger the way she did and the guy pulled out his pack of smokes, it meant you could approach him." According to Fernando Martín Peña, in his melodramas Christensen "gave free rein to his ghosts, which were those of almost every homosexual of the period, forced into repression and pretense. Today it is surprising to think that Safo could have been mistaken for years for a heterosexual love story, when almost nothing that happens in the film makes sense (the overloaded intentionality of protagonist Mecha Ortiz's dialogue, everything that is said about her character, the laughter provoked by her relations with Roberto Escalada) unless Ortiz is portraying a man."

"Safo appears—dazzling—at the party thrown by a big shot. The men of old saw there a perfect scene of a gay pickup. It seemed unbelievable that this rather prudish lady of the northern district could deepen her gaze so much, give it an air of unbridled sexual pursuit, take deep drags on her cigarette while looking at a young guy, foreshadowing what her next object of unrestricted consumption would be. In a totemic pose, she is finally seen beside a nude sculpture, at the top of a staircase. Like a gay young man of old, with the expert and discreet gaze needed to achieve his goal amid a crowd prone to scandal, she spots a young man whom the camera shows from behind, alternating with shots of her looking at him and smoking (him). The scene cuts when she makes the gesture of going in for the capture. What follows is an incredible dialogue. He is on a terrace and wants to return to the ballroom. She stops him at the door and tells him: 'You can't come through here.' 'Why?' he asks. 'Because I don't want you to.' The kid obeys, steps back, and leans on a railing. She, now his shadow, presses up shoulder to shoulder and drives a question at him that sounds like an order: 'Is it so easy to give up a desire?' Absolute mistress of the timing, she moves the dialogue where she wants, asking why he's bored, with so much company around. 'I don't know anyone, I'm not from Buenos Aires.' Her face lights up; she has before her the ideal stud: 'A provincial, then? And there the men don't know how to have fun? Are they all as quiet as you? How do they manage to win over a woman?' 'Well... like everyone,' the provincial replies. Safo had already triumphed: 'Come, you'll explain it to me while we dance.' The waltz returns and the blaze begins. In that moment the first queen of the Argentine gay community was born, and also an image that would allow middle-class ladies to work through their deviant sexual fantasies."

— Ernesto Meccia, 2016.

In 2003, within the framework of New Argentine Cinema, Goyo Anchou made a remake of the film in a queer and underground tone, in which the main female character is played by various drag queens, gay men, and female impersonators.

== See also ==
- Argentine LGBTQ cinema
- List of Argentine films of 1943
- List of melodrama films
- List of rediscovered films

== Bibliography ==
- Aguilar, Gonzalo (2006). Otros mundos. Ensayo sobre el nuevo cine argentino (in Spanish). Buenos Aires: Santiago Arcos Editor. ISBN 987-1240-17-1 – via Internet Archive.
- Di Núbila, Domingo (1998). La época de oro. Historia del cine argentino I (in Spanish). Buenos Aires: Ediciones del Jilguero. ISBN 978-987-957-865-0.
- Fabbro, Gabriela (2024). Lumiton. El sello que marcó el rumbo del cine nacional (in Spanish). Vicente López: Archivo Lumiton. ISBN 978-987-261-511-6.
- Hammer, Tad Bentley (1991). International Film Prizes: An Encyclopedia. New York; London: Garland Publishing. ISBN 0-8240-7099-2 – via Internet Archive.
- Manetti, Ricardo; Rodríguez Riva, Lucía, eds. (2014). 30-50-70. Conformación, crisis y renovación del cine industrial argentino y latinoamericano (PDF) (in Spanish). Buenos Aires: Editorial de la Facultad de Filosofía y Letras, University of Buenos Aires. ISBN 978-987-361-714-0.
- Manrupe, Raúl; Portela, María Alejandra (2001). Un diccionario de films argentinos (1930-1995) (in Spanish). Buenos Aires: Corregidor. ISBN 950-05-0896-6 – via Internet Archive.
- Ortiz, Mecha (1982). Mecha Ortiz (in Spanish). Buenos Aires: Editorial Moreno.
- Peña, Fernando Martín (2012). Cien años de cine argentino (eBook) (in Spanish). Buenos Aires: Editorial Biblos. ISBN 978-987-691-098-9.
