= Con el diablo en el cuerpo =

1947 film

- Directed by: Carlos Hugo Christensen
- Written by: César Tiempo
- Starring: Susana Freyre; Juan Carlos Thorry; Tito Gómez
- Cinematography: Alfredo Traverso
- Edited by: A. Rampoldi
- Music by: George Andreani
- Release date: 21 May 1947
- Running time: 78 minutes
- Country: Argentina
- Language: Spanish

Con el diablo en el cuerpo is a 1947 Argentine film of the classical era of Argentine cinema, directed by Carlos Hugo Christensen and starring Susana Freyre, Juan Carlos Thorry and Tito Gómez.

It is a remake of the 1937 Italian film I've Lost My Husband!.

== Cast ==
- Susana Freyre
- Juan Carlos Thorry
- Tito Gómez
- Miguel Gómez Bao
- Diego Martínez
- Amelita Vargas
- Horacio Peterson
- Gloria Ferrandiz
- Ángel Walk
- Agustín Orrequia
