= Sapho (play) =

1900 play written by Clyde Fitch

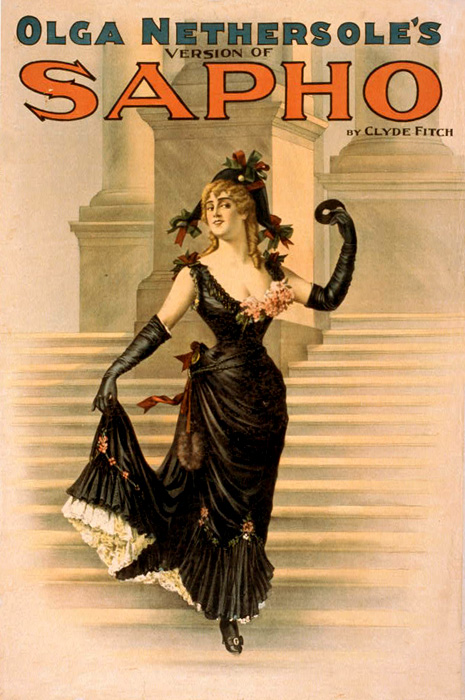
Depiction of Olga Nethersole in poster advertising the play

Sapho was a 1900 American play by Clyde Fitch, based on an 1884 French novel of the same name by Alphonse Daudet and an 1885 play by Daudet and Adolphe Belot. It was at the center of a sensational New York City indecency trial involving the play's star and producer/director, Olga Nethersole. The play was not an exceptional success but the incident is considered a notable step in the transformation of American society's attitudes regarding gender roles and public depictions of sex in the 20th century.

== The play ==
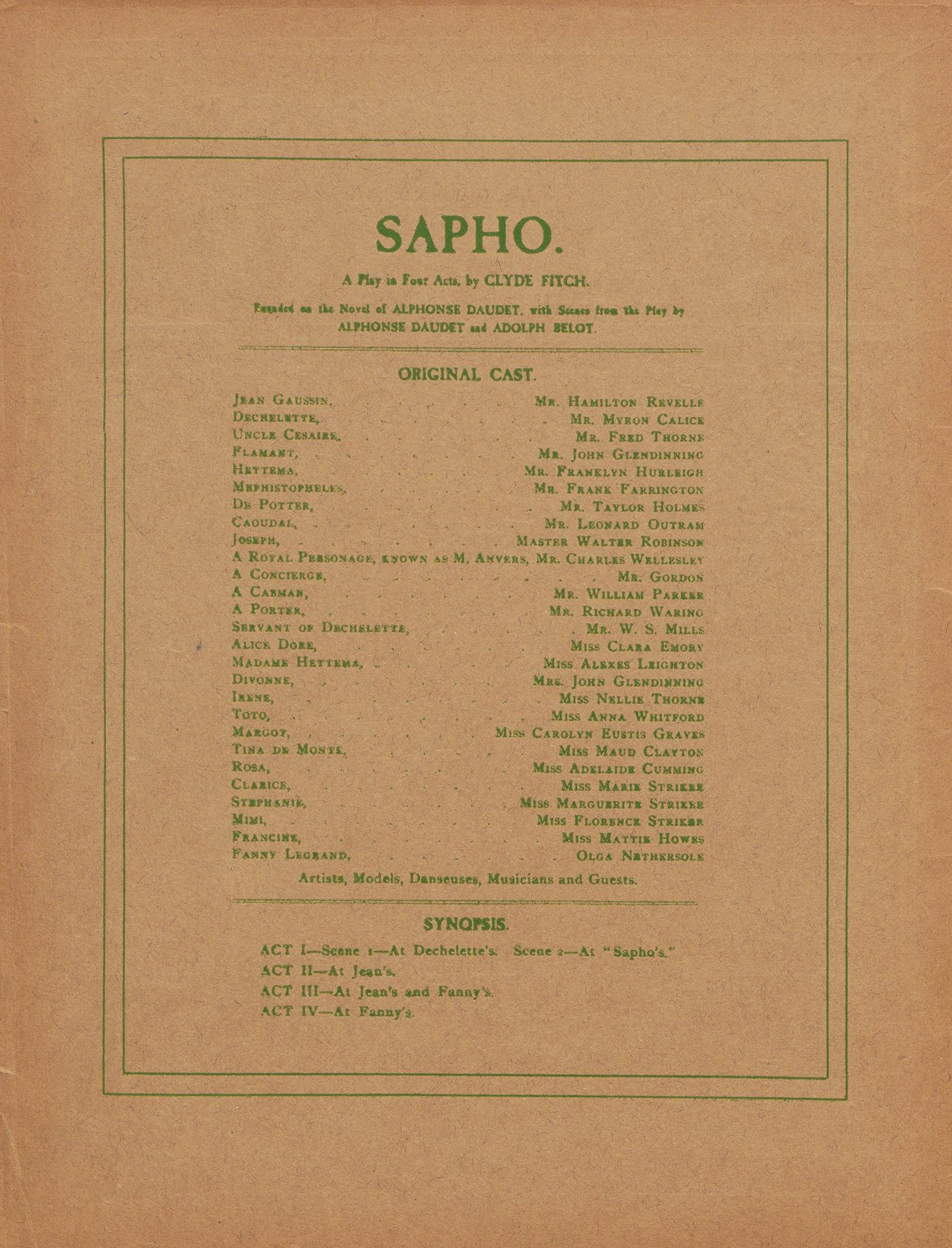
Listing of original Sapho cast, circa 1900

The English actress Olga Nethersole asked prominent American playwright Clyde Fitch to adapt Sapho, telling the story from the point of view of the lead female character rather than the male character as was done with the original novel and play. Nethersole produced, directed and starred. The play's official billing is Sapho, a play in four acts by Clyde Fitch. Founded on the novel by Alphonse Daudet, with scenes from the play by Alphonse Daudet and Adolphe Belot.

Sapho is a so-called "problem play", centering on a woman who has love affairs with men. Nethersole had already added two such dramas, Camille and The Second Mrs. Tanqueray, to her ongoing repertoire. Sapho's lead character, Fanny LeGrand, seduces a naïve man named Jean Gaussin. In the scene that caused the most furor, the two characters ascend a spiral staircase together, presumably toward a bedroom though that is never shown or stated. In the end, LeGrand leaves Gaussin to reform and marry the father of her child.

The play has 23 characters, plus "Danseuses" (female dancers).

- Jean Gaussin
- Uncle Cesaire
- Hettema
- Caoudal
- M. Anvers
- Mephistopheles
- Servant
- Madame Hettema
- Irene
- Tina de Monte
- Rosa
- Francine
- Dechelette
- Flamant
- De Potter
- Joseph
- Concierge
- Porter
- Alice Dore
- Divonne
- Toto
- Margot
- Fanny LeGrand

After out-of-town tryouts in Chicago and other cities, Sapho opened in New York at the old (1881–1915) Wallack's Theatre on Broadway and 30th Street on February 5, 1900. The production's sets were designed by the painter Ernest Albert. Reviews were negative and the press predicted it would flop. The show's notoriety kept it going however, and it ran in New York for a total of 83 performances in 1900. From 1901 through 1913 Nethersole took it on tour to cities throughout America, as well as London and Australia. She brought the play back to New York in 1905, 1908, 1910 and 1913, in the later years sometimes just playing the third act. The play remained controversial, with municipal authorities in some cities continuing to ban performances entirely or insisting on changes in dialogue or costume.

Actors playing Jean Gaussin in the Nethersole productions included Hamilton Revelle (February through May 1900), G. Harrison Hunter (November 1900, and 1910), Slaine Mills (1905), and Winnington Barnes (1913).

The original Broadway choreographer was Carl Marwig and settings were by Ernest Albert.

== Indecency trial ==
Representatives of groups such as the New York Society for the Suppression of Vice, the Society for the Study of Life, and the New York Mother's Club, protested that the play's language and costumes were immoral. Some of the outcry was fuelled by yellow journalism, with trial witnesses admitting their tickets had been provided by New York World reporters. New York District Attorney Asa Bird Gardiner ordered Nethersole, her co-star, and two managers arrested on February 21, and police closed the theatre on March 5. Following a month of intense public and press interest (during which Nethersole and her company performed different plays) and a two-day trial, a jury spent 15 minutes acquitting Nethersole and the others. The play reopened two days later, on April 7.

The Sapho indecency trial is a well-known step in the transition from the era of Victorian morality as it existed in America, particularly as regards attitudes toward onstage depictions of gender, intimacy and sex. According to Olga Nethersole's 1951 obituary, "During the Comstock era...when a public kiss on the mouth was considered an indecency...Nethersole typified the growing revolt against prudery and was a staunch advocate of women's right and intellectual independence."

Some historians theorize that the authorities treated Nethersole more harshly than women appearing in other "courtesan" plays because she was a manager as well as an actress, which upset other contemporary social norms regarding the roles of men and women.

== Other adaptations ==
- Jules Massenet made Daudet's book into an opera that opened in 1898, while Fitch was writing his adaptation for Nethersole.
- The comedy duo of Weber and Fields routinely satirized Broadway plays and sent up Sapho in a sketch called Sapolio at the Weber and Fields' Broadway Music Hall.
- Daudet and Belot's original French version was presented in New York by the repertory companies of the actresses Mme. Réjane in 1904 and Sarah Bernhardt in 1910.
- Several stage versions were written in addition to Fitch's, because the novel was published in France and not covered by the American copyright laws of the day.
- A now-lost 1916 Theda Bara film, The Eternal Sapho, was based on the Daudet story but not necessarily on the Fitch play. Three Sapho films have been made in French.
- The 1943 Argentine film Safo, historia de una pasión is an adaptation of Daudet's novel.

== Misconceptions and errors ==
- Thomas Allston Brown's 1903 A History of the New York Stage from the First Performance in 1732 to 1901 incorrectly lists Sapho's opening night as Feb. 16, 1900, rather than Feb. 5, 1900. Several other sources have duplicated this error.
- The etymology of the term "Nethersole Kiss", a deeply passionate on-stage kiss, dates from Nethersole's 1896-97 production of the play Carmen, but is often attributed to the later Sapho.

== Bibliography ==
- Brown, Thomas Allston, A History of the New York Stage from the First Performance in 1732 to 1901, Volume III, (New York: Dodd, Mead and Company), 1903.
- Houchin, John H. "Depraved Women and Wicked Plays: Olga Nethersole's Production of Sapho," Journal of American Drama and Theatre, v.6, Winter 1994.
- Johnson, Katie N., "Censoring Sapho: Regulating the Fallen Woman and the Prostitute on the New York Stage," American Transcendental Quarterly: 19th Century American Literature and Culture, v.10, n.3, Sep. 1996, pp. 167–86.
- Johnson, Katie N., Sisters in Sin: Brothel Drama in America, 1900-1920, (Cambridge: Cambridge University Press), 2006. ISBN 0-521-85505-5
- Johnson, Katie N, "Zaza: That 'Obtruding Harlot' of the Stage," Theatre Journal, v.54, Iss.2, May 2002, pp. 223–243.
- Mantle, Burns, and Garrison P. Sherwood, eds., The Best Plays of 1899-1909, (Philadelphia: The Blakiston Company), 1944.
- Mathews, Nancy Mowll, Charles Musser, Williams College, Moving Pictures: American Art and Early Film, 1880-1910, Volume 1, (Manchester, VT: Hudson Hills Press), 2005. ISBN 1-55595-228-3
- "Daudet's Sapho Dramatized," The Nation , Volume 42, Jan. 14,1886, p. 32.
- "Sapho In Chicago: Olga Nethersole Appears as Daudet's Heroine," New York Times : Nov. 1, 1899, p. 7.
- "This Week's New Bills:...And The Deferred Sapho," The New York Times, Feb. 4, 1900, p. 16.
- "Dramatic And Musical: Miss Nethersole At Last Acts Fanny Le Grand At Wallack's" (Play Review), New York Times , Feb. 6, 1900, p. 6.
- "Sapho Taken To Court: Charged With Offending Public Morals And Decency. Miss Olga Nethersole, However, Gives Her Play As Usual At Wallack's – The Hearing To-Morrow," The New York Times, Feb. 22, 1900, p. 3.
- "Sapho In Police Court: Magistrate Mott Hears Testimony Against The Play. Miss Nethersole At The Bar. The Complainant Examined As To His Reasons For Considering The Performance Immoral," The New York Times, Feb. 24, 1900, p. 7.
- "Hearing In Sapho Case.: Mrs. Sophia Almon Hensley, Mrs. S.M. Harris, Hilary Bell, And Mrs. Eloise I Church Testify," The New York Times, Feb. 28, 1900, p. 4.
- "Indictment For "Sapho: Trial Of The Case To Begin To-Day Before Justice Fursman. Miss Olga Nethersole, Ill With Nervous Prostration, Will Not Perform Again For A Week Or Two," The New York Times, Mar. 23, 1900; p. 2.
- "Court Cuts Short The Sapho Trial: The Jury Will Decide Olga Nethersole's Case To-Day. She Will Offer No Evidence. Justice Fursman Shuts Our Irrelevant Testimony And Rebukes The Prosecutions Principal Witness," The New York Times, Apr. 5, 1900, p. 7.
- "Jury Soon Acquits Miss Nethersole: Verdict Followed By An Ovation For The Weeping Actress. To Produce Sapho Again. After Hearing Justice Fursman's Charge, She Declares, She Would Not Have Minded Conviction," The New York Times, Apr. 6, 1900, p. 7.
- "Sapho Company To Disband: Will Play in Milwaukee and St. Louis and Then Return to New York," The New York Times, Feb. 7, 1901, p. 9.
- "'Sapho' Produced in London," The New York Times, May 2, 1902, p. 9.
- "No Staircase Scene In The French Sapho: Badly Sprained Morals Still Evident In Rejane's Version. Unhealthy Fare At Best. Actress's Playing Of The Coccotte A Study In Convincing Naturalness—Production Inadequate Scenically," The New York Times, Nov. 29, 1904, p. 6.
- "Springfield Won't Stand Sapho," The New York Times, Jan. 5, 1906, p. 5.
- "Olga Nethersole in Sapho", The New York Times, Apr. 19, 1910, p. 9.
- "Nethersole in Sapho, Warmly Greeted in Third Act of Play at Palace Theatre", The New York Times, Oct. 7, 1913, p. 13.
- "Nethersole Kiss Mere Peck Compared to This Embrace", Milwaukee Journal, Nov. 3, 1918, p. 7.
- "Olga Nethersole Dies At Age Of 80: Famed British Actress, Whose Role In Sapho Led To Furor, Quit Stage to Aid Poor", The New York Times, Jan. 11, 1951, p. 2.
