= Una Atrevida aventurita =

1948 film

- Directed by: Carlos Hugo Christensen
- Written by: Julio Porter
- Produced by: Carlos Hugo Christensen
- Starring: Roberto Escalada; Tito Gómez
- Cinematography: Alfredo Traverso
- Edited by: A. Rampoldi
- Music by: George Andreani
- Release date: 1948
- Country: Argentina
- Language: Spanish

Una Atrevida aventurita is a 1948 Argentine film of the classical era of Argentine cinema, directed by Carlos Hugo Christensen, written by Julio Porter and starring Roberto Escalada.

== Cast ==
- Carlos Bellucci
- Beba Bidart
- Angel Boffa
- Max Citelli
- Miguel Coiro
- Roberto Escalada
- Susana Freyre
- Ramón Garay
- Miguel Gómez Bao
- Tito Gómez
- Diego Martínez
- Felisa Mary
- Julio Renato
- Marcelo Ruggero
- Marino Seré
- Oscar Villa
- Ernesto Villegas
- Ángel Walk
