= The Naked Angel =

- Theatrical release poster
- Spanish: El ángel desnudo
- Directed by: Carlos Hugo Christensen
- Screenplay by: César Tiempo
- Based on: Fräulein Else (1924) by Arthur Schnitzler
- Starring: Olga Zubarry; Guillermo Battaglia; Carlos Cores; Eduardo Cuitiño
- Cinematography: Alfredo Traverso
- Edited by: Antonio Rampoldi
- Music by: George Andreani
- Production company: Lumiton
- Release date: 14 November 1946 (Buenos Aires)
- Running time: 85 minutes
- Country: Argentina
- Language: Spanish

The Naked Angel (Spanish: El ángel desnudo) is a 1946 Argentine melodrama film directed by Carlos Hugo Christensen and starring Olga Zubarry—in her first leading role—as well as Guillermo Battaglia, Carlos Cores and Eduardo Cuitiño. It was produced by the studio Lumiton during the classical-industrial period of Argentine cinema. Based on the novella Fräulein Else (1924) by Arthur Schnitzler, with adapted screenplay by César Tiempo, the film follows a 17-year-old girl whose father sends her to Rio de Janeiro to borrow money from a sculptor he knows in order to pay off his gambling debts, but upon her arrival the sculptor tells her he will lend it only if she poses nude for him. It featured cinematography by Alfredo Traverso, music by George Andreani and editing by Antonio Rampoldi.

The film premiered on 14 November 1946 at the Ópera cinema in Buenos Aires and became a commercial success thanks to the publicity generated by its controversial content. Christensen had become a pioneer of Argentine erotic cinema by introducing sexually charged themes into his melodramas, beginning with Safo, historia de una pasión (1943) and continuing with The Naked Angel and Los pulpos (1948), the latter also starring Zubarry. The film is regarded as the first in Argentine cinema to feature a nude scene, albeit a simulated one, in which Zubarry appeared with her back to the camera, from the waist up.

The Naked Angel was well received by critics upon its release and, at the awards of the Argentine Film Critics Association (currently known as the Silver Condor Awards), Zubarry received the Best New Actress prize for her work. The film's success allowed the young Zubarry to establish herself as a leading star, and over time she would become one of the most iconic actresses in Argentine cinema. The Naked Angel is now regarded as a cult film and a classic. In 2000, it reached the 35th position in a survey of the 100 greatest films of Argentine cinema carried out by the Museo del Cine Pablo Ducrós Hicken.

== Plot ==
Guillermo Battaglia and Olga Zubarry in The Naked Angel.

In Paris, at a banquet celebrating the grand prize awarded by the Society of Art Critics of France to the sculptor of The Naked Angel, a man approaches the artist and shoots him dead. The killer is Gaspar Las Heras, and the film moves into a flashback set in Buenos Aires.

Gaspar wins 15,000 pesos at a poker game. The next day is the 17th birthday of his daughter, Elsa. He gives her a new car and two tickets to spend the autumn in Rio de Janeiro with her aunt Diana. Elsa takes the car out with her fiancé Mario, a university student, who must stay behind to finish his exams. Shortly afterward, Gaspar's partner, Vargas, tells him that their shares have collapsed and that they are ruined. Gaspar decides to go ahead with the trip so that Elsa will not witness his downfall.

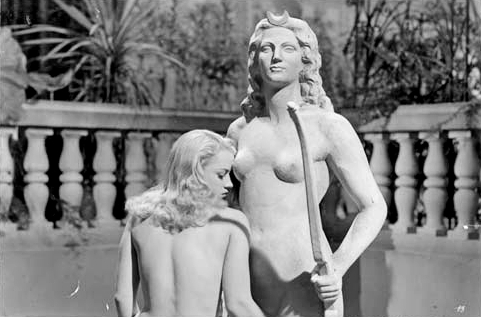
Olga Zubarry in what is often credited as the first nude scene in Argentine cinema.

Some time later, Gaspar writes to Elsa from Buenos Aires that he has committed a reckless act and must replace 50,000 pesos within days. He asks her to find Guillermo Lagos Renard, a wealthy sculptor he helped early in his career, and give him an enclosed letter requesting the loan. Elsa, who tells her aunt nothing of her father's real situation, visits the sculptor alone in his mansion. Lagos Renard, who keeps a portrait of Elsa's late mother, confesses that he once loved her, only to lose her to Gaspar. He agrees to lend the money on the condition that Elsa allows him to gaze at her completely naked, and promises not to touch her. Elsa leaves in tears.

Elsa tells her aunt only that the sculptor has imposed conditions, and she does not reveal what they are. Mario joins her in Rio, where they declare their love and she promises to be his in life and in death. Vargas also arrives in Rio and tells Elsa that her father lost heavily at gambling and issued checks without funds, and that his creditors are threatening him. When she next sees Lagos Renard, she greets him, which he takes as her acceptance. The sculptor sends the check, and when Gaspar telephones, Elsa lies and tells him that no humiliating condition was imposed.

On the appointed night, Elsa goes to the sculptor's house and keeps her word, posing nude for him. At that moment, she shoots herself and dies.

== Cast ==
- Olga Zubarry as Elsa Las Heras
- Guillermo Battaglia as Guillermo Lagos Renard
- Carlos Cores as Mario
- Eduardo Cuitiño as Gaspar Las Heras
- Agustín Orrequia as Vargas
- Fedel Despres as Diana
- Cirilo Etulain as Morales
- José de Ángelis as the Prefect
- Orestes Soriani as the President of the Society of Art Critics
- Cecilio de la Vega as Dubois

== Production and style ==
Olga Zubarry with cameraman Aníbal González Paz during the film's shooting in Rio de Janeiro.

The Naked Angel was the last film of 1946 from Lumiton, one of the leading studios of the classical-industrial period of Argentine cinema. In addition to being filmed in the studio's soundstages in Munro, Greater Buenos Aires, exterior scenes were shot in Rio de Janeiro, Brazil. It was written by César Tiempo, based on Arthur Schnitzler's novella Fräulein Else (1924), with cinematography by Alfredo Traverso, music by George Andreani, set design by Jean de Bravura, sculptures by Aquilio Demarchi and editing by Antonio Rampoldi.

Director Carlos Hugo Christensen had become a pioneer of erotic cinema in Argentina with Safo, historia de una pasión (1943), one of his previous films for the studio, and The Naked Angel marked the continuation of this style, which—though modest compared to the cinema of subsequent decades—was the first to incorporate strong, sexually-charged elements. Safo, historia de una pasión marked the beginning of a new phase in Christensen's filmography, characterized by daring themes and an alternation between two styles: light romantic comedies and erotic melodramas with a dark, uneasy tone. The Naked Angel fell into this second group and, along with Los pulpos (1948), consolidated the director's reputation as the enfant terrible of the industry.

Christensen cast actress Olga Zubarry, who was 16 years old at the time of production, in her first leading role, following her debut in a minor role in his previous film, the racy comedy Adán y la serpiente (1946). In a 2013 interview with film historians Guillermo Russo and Andrés Insaurralde, Zubarry explained that her role in The Naked Angel had been written for the young star Mirtha Legrand, who likely turned it down because the film's subject matter was considered daring for the time. The film is often credited as the first to feature a nude scene in Argentine cinema, although the nudity is simulated and only showed Zubarry from the waist up and with her back to the camera. In addition, the actress' body was covered with a flesh-colored mesh. The first full-frontal nude scene in local cinema—and in all of Latin America—would not appear until the film El trueno entre las hojas (1958), starring Isabel Sarli.

== Release and reception ==
Olga Zubarry in a still of The Naked Angel. Her performance earned her the Best New Actress award by the Argentine Film Critics Association

The Naked Angel premiered on 14 November 1946 at the Ópera cinema in Buenos Aires and was rated as unsuitable for viewers under 18. The anticipation surrounding its risqué subject matter and the exterior scenes filmed in Rio de Janeiro drew in audiences, and the film was a box office hit. Zubarry later recalled that the film's success earned her a three-year contract with Lumiton and allowed her to take on major leading roles in the years that followed. She went on to have a career spanning more than five decades and became one of the most iconic actresses in Argentine cinema. Film historian Domingo Di Núbila wrote in 1960 that the The Naked Angel was a "huge success despite being riddled with all sorts of falsehoods", attributing this to the appeal of its title, which was effectively exploited in advertising, and that the film established Zubarry as "the first sexy star of Argentine cinema".

The film was well received by critics. Calki of newspaper El Mundo noted the film for its "bold theme and commendable direction", and praised above all Zubarry's performance, noting that she "takes on a risky venture early in her acting career." In its review of the film, the newspaper Crítica praised Christensen for his "mastery of the craft and intelligent staging of scenes", while also noting the "effectively shot cinematography" and describing the music and dialogue as "strident". At the awards of the Argentine Film Critics Association (currently known as the Silver Condor Awards), Zubarry received the prize for Best New Actress for her work in the film.

== Legacy ==
The Naked Angel is regarded as a cult film and a classic of Argentine cinema. In a survey of the 100 greatest films of Argentine cinema carried out by the Museo del Cine Pablo Ducrós Hicken in 2000, the film reached the 35th position.

== Bibliography ==
- Di Núbila, Domingo (1960). Historia del cine argentino. Tomo II (in Spanish). Buenos Aires: Cruz de Malta.
- Fabbro, Gabriela (2024). Lumiton. El sello que marcó el rumbo del cine nacional (in Spanish). Vicente López: Archivo Lumiton. ISBN 978-987-261-511-6.
- Hammer, Tad Bentley (1991). International Film Prizes: An Encyclopedia. New York; London: Garland Publishing. ISBN 0-8240-7099-2 – via Internet Archive.
- Manrupe, Raúl; Portela, María Alejandra (2001). Un diccionario de films argentinos (1930-1995) (in Spanish). Buenos Aires: Corregidor. ISBN 950-05-0896-6 – via Internet Archive.
- Peña, Fernando Martín (2012). Cien años de cine argentino (eBook) (in Spanish). Buenos Aires: Editorial Biblos. ISBN 978-987-691-098-9.
- Schroeder Rodríguez, Paul A. (2016). Latin American Cinema: A Comparative History. University of California Press. p. 317. ISBN 978-052-028-863-8.
