= Beba Bidart =

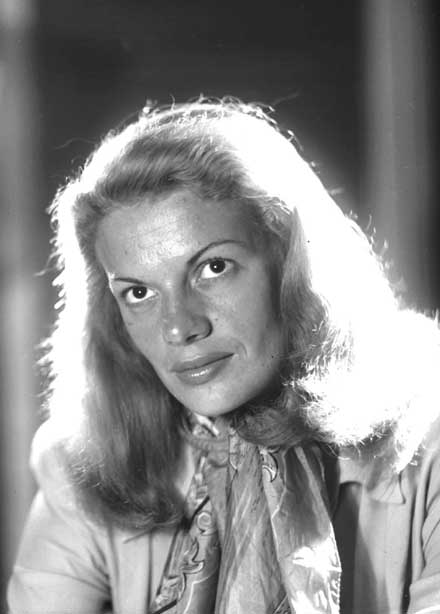
- Born: Eliane René Schianni Bidart; April 3, 1924; Buenos Aires, Argentina
- Died: August 27, 1994 (aged 70)
- Occupations: Singer; Dancer; Actress
- Years active: 1944–1993

Eliane René Schianni Bidart (stage name, Beba Bidart; April 3, 1924 – August 27, 1994), was an Argentine tango singer, actress and dancer.

Eliane René Schianni Bidart was born April 3, 1924, in Buenos Aires. She began her studies at the age of ten at Teatro Infantil Labardén. She made thirty tango recordings accompanied by the Francisco Canaro's orchestra and others. Her very first film was Los Pulpos "Octopussy" (1948) opening out her path for acting on as many as thirty movies in total. She had been in a 12-year relationship with TV host Cacho Fontana. She adopted a child, Paulo soon after her divorce from Mr. Fontana. She died of a heart attack on August 27, 1994.

== Filmography ==
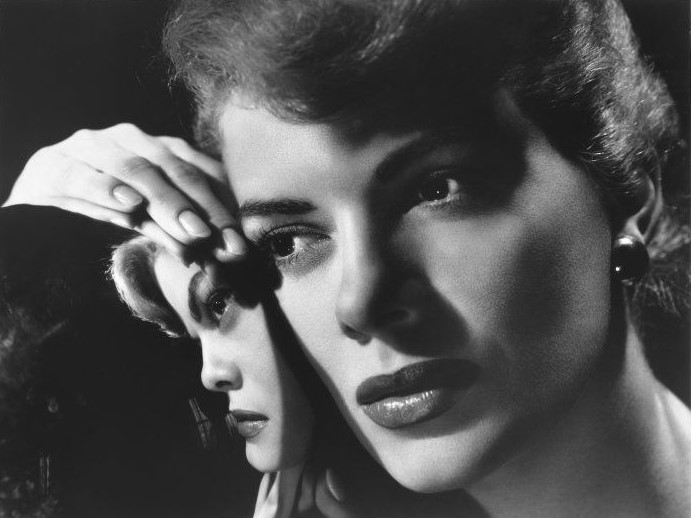
Beba Bidart 1940, by Annemarie Heinrich

Year	Title	Role	Notes
1944	El muerto falta a la cita		
1947	El que recibe las bofetadas		
1947	Los verdes paraísos		
1948	La serpiente de cascabel	Bailarina	
1948	Los pulpos		
1948	Una atrevida aventurita	Agatha	
1949	Una noche en el Ta Ba Rin	Secretaria del sr. Duque	
1949	¿Por qué mintió la cigüeña?		
1950	Nacha Regules		
1950	Toscanito y los detectives		
1951	Especialista en señoras		
1952	The Tunnel	Dora	
1952	La bestia debe morir	Rhoda Carpax	
1952	El baldío		
1953	La Vendedora de fantasías	Olga Bernard	
1953	La niña del gato		
1953	La casa grande	Malena	
1956	África ríe		
1956	El satélite chiflado		
1962	El mago de las finanzas		
1963	La calesita		
1964	La sentencia	The Bettina's friend	
1964	Buenas noches, Buenos Aires		
1964	Cuidado con las colas		
1965	Esta noche mejor no		
1968	Villa Cariño está que arde	Esposa del bombero	
1969	Los muchachos de antes no usaban gomina		
1970	Con alma y vida	Susana	
1974	Rolando Rivas, taxista		
1976	Los chicos crecen	Francisco Fiorentino	
1978	La parte del león	Dueña de la pensión	
1980	El infierno tan temido		
1981	El bromista		
1982	Buenos Aires Tango		
1987	Susana quiere, el negro también!	Matilde	
1993	Funes, un gran amor	Doña Pancha	
