= The Lady of Death =

1946 film

- film poster
- Directed by: Carlos Hugo Christensen
- Written by: Robert Louis Stevenson (story); César Tiempo
- Produced by: Carlos Gallart
- Starring: Carlos Cores; Judith Sulian; Guillermo Battaglia
- Cinematography: Alfredo Traverso
- Music by: George Andreani
- Production company: Chile Films
- Distributed by: Chile Films
- Release date: 1946
- Running time: 80 minutes
- Country: Chile
- Language: Spanish

The Lady of Death (Spanish:La Dama de la Muerte) is a 1946 Chilean thriller film directed by Carlos Hugo Christensen for Chile Films S.A. and starring Carlos Cores, Judith Sulian and Guillermo Battaglia. The film is based on the short story collection The Suicide Club by Robert Louis Stevenson.

== Cast ==
- Carlos Cores as Roberto Braun
- Judith Sulian
- Guillermo Battaglia as Hugo Clinton
- Juan Corona as Club's President
- Mafalda Tinelli
- Plácido Martín
- Italo Martinez
- Agustín Orrequia
- Agustín Sire
- Arturo Gonzalvez
- Meche Calvo
- José Carrera
- Jaime Errazurlz
- Mimi Garflas
- Eugenio Guzman
- José Gómez
- Carlos Morris
- Hugo Mosser
- William Russell
- Teodoro Salinas
- Eduardo Stone

== Bibliography ==
- Rist, Peter H. Historical Dictionary of South American Cinema. Rowman & Littlefield, 2014.
