= Sappho (novel) =

1884 novels by Alphonse Daudet

Sappho: Parisian Manners
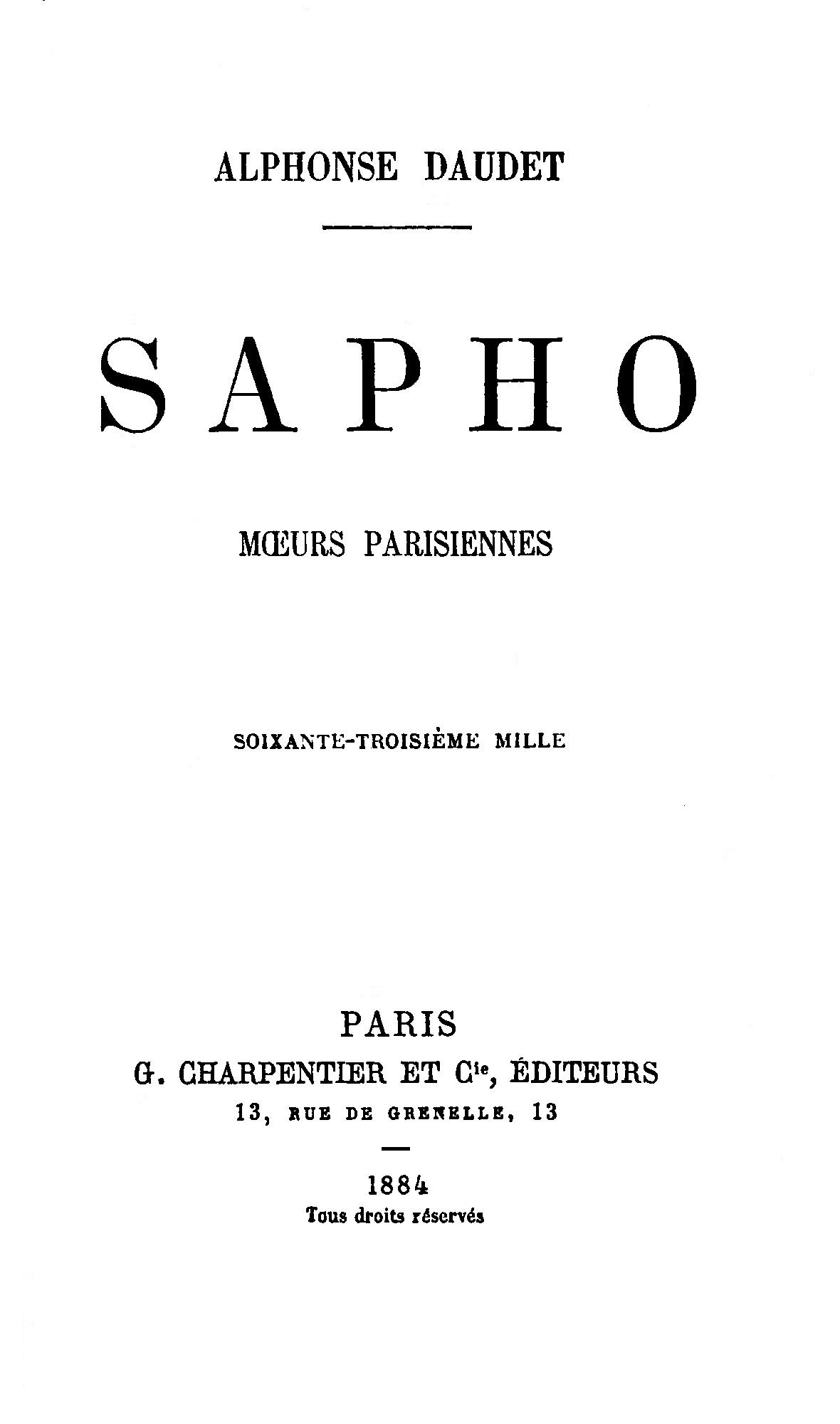
- Title page
- Author: Alphonse Daudet
- Original title: Sapho : moeurs parisiennes
- Language: French
- Publisher: L'Écho de Paris; G. Charpentier
- Publication date: 1884
- Publication place: France
- English publication date: 1886
- Pages: 337

Sappho: Parisian Manners (French: Sapho : moeurs parisiennes) is an 1884 novel by the French writer Alphonse Daudet. It was serialised in L'Écho de Paris in 1884.

== Plot ==
The book is largely autobiographical and inspired by Daudet's relationship with Marie Rieu. Jean Gaussin is a young man from a wealthy family in southern France and works for the government in Paris. He begins a relationship with Fanny Legrand, initially unaware of her career as a scandalous model under the name Sappho. They live together for five years and eventually adopt a child. Fanny is smitten with the child and becomes distant from Jean. Jean begins an affair with another woman, Irène, favoured by his parents to become his wife, only to return to Fanny with renewed affection. The relationship becomes more complicated when Jean realises the child they adopted is Fanny's biological child from a previous affair with a criminal, prompting him to reject her again. Realising his intact, strong affection for Fanny, Jean cancels his plans to marry Irène and returns to Fanny, who agrees to leave with him. Jean goes ahead to Marseille, but is informed by Fanny that she will not join him.

== Reception ==
The book inspired a wave of novels with lesbian themes, including Sapphô (1884) by Jean Richepin, Un crime d'amour (1886) by Paul Bourget, Paris impur (1889) by Charles Vimaire, Gomorrhe (1889) by Henri d'Argis, La Dernière journée de Sapphó (1901) by Gabriel Faure and Sapho de Lesbos (1902) by Maurice Morel.

The 1943 Carlos Hugo Christensen Argentine film, Safo, historia de una pasión, is based on the novel. Reputedly, it is the first "erotic melodrama" in Argentine cinema.

== Adaptations ==
Mecha Ortiz as the titular character in Safo, historia de una pasión (1943).

- Sapho, 1885 play by Daudet and Adolphe Belot
- Sapho, 1897 opera composed by Jules Massenet to a libretto by Henri Caïn and Arthur Bernède
- Sapho, 1900 play by Clyde Fitch
- Sapho, 1913 American film directed by Lucius J. Henderson
- The Eternal Sapho, 1916 American films directed by Bertram Bracken
- Sapho, 1917 American film directed by Hugh Ford
- Inspiration, 1931 American films directed by Clarence Brown
- Sapho, 1934 French film directed by Léonce Perret
- Safo, historia de una pasión, 1943 Argentine film directed by Carlos Hugo Christensen
- Amor y sexo, 1964 Mexican film directed by Luis Alcoriza
- Sapho ou la Fureur d'aimer, 1971 French film directed by Georges Farrel
