= Yo no elegí mi vida =

- Directed by: Antonio Momplet
- Music by: George Andreani
- Release date: 1949
- Country: Argentina
- Language: Spanish

Yo no elegí mi vida is a 1949 film of the classical era of Argentine cinema.

== Cast ==
- Arturo de Córdova
- Olga Zubarry
- Enrique Santos Discépolo
- Guillermo Battaglia
- Alberto Bello
- Eloy Álvarez
- Juan Corona
- Homero Cárpena
- Bertha Moss
- Joaquín Petrocino
- Iris Portillo
- Marcos Zucker
- Maruja Pais
- José Comellas
- Raúl Luar
