= Swan Song (1945 film) =

- Directed by: Carlos Hugo Christensen
- Written by: César Tiempo
- Starring: Mecha Ortiz; Roberto Escalada; Miguel Gómez Bao; Nicolás Fregues
- Cinematography: Alfredo Traverso
- Edited by: Antonio Rampoldi
- Music by: George Andreani
- Production company: Lumiton
- Distributed by: Lumiton
- Release date: 27 April 1945
- Running time: 109 minutes
- Country: Argentina
- Language: Spanish

Swan Song (Spanish: El canto del cisne) is a 1945 Argentine romantic melodrama film of the classical era of Argentine cinema, directed by Carlos Hugo Christensen and starring Mecha Ortiz, Roberto Escalada and Miguel Gómez Bao. The film portrays the ultimately tragic relationship between a young composer and a more mature woman. Her performance won Ortiz the Argentine Film Academy's Silver Condor Award for Best Actress.

== Cast ==
- Mecha Ortiz as Flora Jordán
- Roberto Escalada as Miguel Angel
- Miguel Gómez Bao as Mendoza
- Nicolás Fregues as Leopoldo Jordán
- Nelly Darén as Susana Jordán
- Juan Corona as Doctor Menéndez
- Susana Freyre as Sofía
- Rita Juárez as Beatriz
- María Armand as Dora
- Aurelia Ferrer

== Bibliography ==
- Rist, Peter H. Historical Dictionary of South American Cinema. Rowman & Littlefield, 2014.
