= María Magdalena (film) =

1954 film directed by Carlos Hugo Christensen

- Directed by: Carlos Hugo Christensen
- Starring: Laura Hidalgo
- Music by: George Andreani
- Release date: 1954
- Country: Argentina
- Language: Spanish

María Magdalena is a 1954 Argentine melodrama film of the classical era of Argentine cinema, directed by Carlos Hugo Christensen and starring Laura Hidalgo in the title role. It was Christensen's last film before he continued filming in Brazil.

== Plot ==
María, a passionate and selfish woman, willingly maintains an affair with Rómulo, a married man who ends up abandoning his fragile and insecure wife to unleash all his passions with her. Being wealthy and gorgeous Maria also displays cynicism, pride and unscrupulousness which causes torture and suffering of those around her. Then came David, a dedicated scientist who attends to the unprotected and sacrificed workers of Maria's plantation, which showed the latter the ghosts of her licentious life.

== Cast ==
- Laura Hidalgo as Maria Magdalena Da Silva
- Francisco Martínez Allende as Prof. David Guimaraes
