= Roberto Escalada =

Argentine actor (1914–1986)

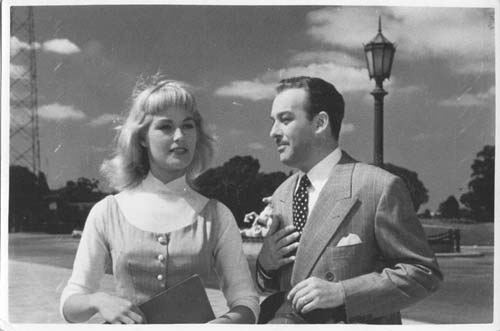

Roberto Escalada born Aldo Roberto Leggero (4 July 1914 – 5 December 1986 in Buenos Aires) was an Argentine actor during the Golden Age of Argentine cinema.

Roberto Escalada began his career working on the radio, and it was his voice that caught the attention of producers. On meeting him, film producers, pleased by his physical appearance, immediately put him in as a member of different movie casts.

One of his more acclaimed films of the 1940s was Los Pulpos (The Octopuses), a film directed by Carlos Hugo Christensen.

In 1950, Escalada played the central role in Mr Oribe's Crime, based on Bioy Casares' short novel. In 1955 he played a conniving businessman in Ayer fue primavera (Yesterday it was spring), directed by Fernando Ayala.

His life changed at the beginning of the 1960s when he got married and start working on TV. As a heavy smoker, he had some health concerns during the 1960s, and he spent the later years of this life in television taking a number of smaller roles.

He made over 55 film and TV appearances in Argentina between 1939 and 1980.

His health declined in the early 1980s, and he died on 5 December 1986 of a smoking related heart attack at age 72 in Buenos Aires.

== Filmography ==
- El diablo metió la pata (1980) dir. Carlos Rinaldi
- Hormiga negra (1979) dir. Ricardo Alberto Defilippi
- Un idilio de estación (1978) dir. Aníbal Uset
- Los irrompibles (1975) dir. Emilio Vieyra
- Clínica con música (1974) dir. Francisco Guerrero
- El profesor tirabombas (1972) dir. Fernando Ayala
- Nino (1972) dir. Federico Curiel
- Con alma y vida (1970) dir. David José Kohon
- El mundo es de los jóvenes (1970) dir. Julio Porter
- Los debutantes en el amor (1969) dir. Leo Fleider
- El profesor hippie (1969) dir. Fernando Ayala
- Viaje de una noche de verano (1965)
- Esta noche mejor no (1965) dir. Julio Saraceni
- Dos quijotes sobre ruedas (1964) dir. Emilio Vieyra
- La familia Falcón (1963) dir. Román Viñoly Barreto
- Culpable (1960) dir. Hugo del Carril
- La sombra de Safo (1957) dir. Julio Porter
- Pecadora (1956) dir. Enrique Carreras
- De noche también se duerme (1956) dir. Enrique Carreras
- Ayer fue primavera (1955) dir. Fernando Ayala
- Vida nocturna (1955) dir. Leo Fleider
- La bestia humana (1954) dir. Daniel Tinayre
- Sucedió en Buenos Aires (1954) dir. Enrique Cahen Salaberry
- El vampiro negro (1953) dir. Román Viñoly Barreto
- Black Ermine (1953) dir. Carlos Hugo Christensen
- Don't Ever Open That Door (1952) dir. Carlos Hugo Christensen
- Sala de guardia (1952) dir. Tulio Demicheli
- De turno con la muerte (1951) dir. Julio Porter
- Cartas de amor (1951) dir. Mario C. Lugones
- Una Viuda casi alegre (1950) dir. Román Viñoly Barreto
- The Crime of Oribe (1950) dir. Leopoldo Torres Ríos
- Morir en su ley (1949) dir. Manuel Romero
- Se llamaba Carlos Gardel (1949) dir. León Klimovsky
- ¿Por qué mintió la cigüeña? (1949) dir. Carlos Hugo Christensen
- La gran tentación (1948) dir. Ernesto Arancibia
- La muerte camina en la lluvia (1948) Carlos Hugo Christensen
- Una atrevida aventurita (1948) dir. Carlos Hugo Christensen
- Los pulpos (1948) dir. Carlos Hugo Christensen
- The Gambler (1947) dir. León Klimovsky
- Madame Bovary (1947) dir. Carlos Schlieper
- Treinta segundos de amor (1947) dir. Luis Mottura
- Un beso en la nuca (1946) dir. Luis Mottura
- Cinco besos (1945) dir. Luis Saslavsky
- Swan Song (1945) dir. Carlos Hugo Christensen
- Veinticuatro horas en la vida de una mujer (1944) dir. Carlos Borcosque
- Safo, historia de una pasión (1943) dir. Carlos Hugo Christensen
- Pájaros sin nido (1940) dir. José A. Ferreyra
- El matrero (1939) dir. Orestes Caviglia
- Doce mujeres (1939) dir. Luis J. Moglia Barth
