= George Andreani =

Polish composer (1901–1979)

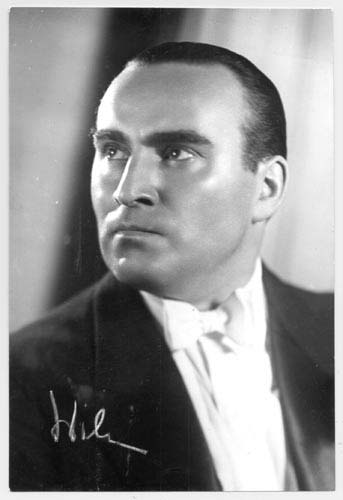
George Andreani

George Andreani, pseudonym Josef Dvořáček (born as Josef Kumok; 28 February 1901 in Warsaw, Poland – 2 April 1979 in Buenos Aires, Argentina) was a Polish composer, film score composer, pianist, conductor, and actor. He was noted for his scores of some 75 Argentine films during the Golden Age of Argentine cinema from 1937 to 1959. Aside from his prolific work as a score composer, he was also conductor of the Orquesta Sinfónica Schenley in the 1940s.

== Career ==
He participated as an actor in the film Lelíček al Servicio de Sherlock Holmes, whose role was that of a composer (in addition to scoring the music for that film).

He arrived in Buenos Aires in 1937 (where he adopted the name George Andreani). He collaborated with both Argentine and Chilean films. He worked with directors such as Carlos Hugo Christensen, Arturo García Buhr, Enrique Susini, among others. Most of the films he scored belonged to the Lumiton label. In Chile he was hired by Chile Films in 1946 and composed music for films of that studio such as La dama de la muerte and El diamante del Maharaja, as well as for other independent filmmakers.

He conducted the large symphonic orchestra that he conducted at Radio Splendid and was the conductor for 5 years of the "Fiesta de la Vendimia" in the province of Mendoza. He was also in the "Fiesta Mobiloil" along with Nelly de la Vega, Miguel Caló, Pedro Farías, Cayetano La Ferla and Juan Carlos Pini.

== Filmography as composer ==
As Josef Kumok:

- 1932: Lelíček ve službách Sherlocka Holmese
- 1932: Načeradec král kibiců
- 1932: Právo na hřích
- 1932: Tisíc za jednu noc
- 1933: Její lékař
- 1933: Madla z cihelny
- 1933: Okénko^{cs}
- 1933: Rozmary mládí
- 1933: Sejde s očí, sejde s mysli...
- 1934: Dokud máš maminku
- 1934: Grand Hotel Nevada
- 1934: Hudba srdcí
- 1934: Zlatá Kateřina
- 1935: Raging Barbora
- 1935: Pan otec Karafiát
- 1936: Le Golem
- 1936: Naše XI.
- 1936: Sextánka
- 1937: Děvčátko z venkova
- 1938: Bílá vrána

As George Andreani:

- 1937: Fuera de la ley
- 1938: La chismosa
- 1940: The Englishman of the Bones
- 1941: White Eagle
- 1941: Embrujo
- 1942: Noche de bodas
- 1942: El gran secreto
- 1942: En el último piso
- 1942: Locos de verano
- 1942: A Light in the Window
- 1942: La novia de primavera
- 1942: Los chicos crecen
- 1943: Safo, historia de una pasión
- 1943: 16 años
- 1944: Se rematan ilusiones
- 1944: La pequeña señora de Pérez
- 1945: Rigoberto
- 1945: La señora de Pérez se divorcia
- 1945: Swan Song
- 1945: Las seis suegras de Barba Azul
- 1946: The Lady of Death
- 1946: The Naked Angel
- 1946: Un beso en la nuca
- 1946: No salgas esta noche
- 1946: Adán y la serpiente
- 1946: Deshojando margaritas
- 1947: La dama del collar
- 1947: Treinta segundos de amor
- 1947: Los verdes paraísos
- 1947: Con el diablo en el cuerpo
- 1948: La locura de don Juan
- 1948: Los secretos del buzón
- 1948: La muerte camina en la lluvia
- 1948: Hoy cumple años mamá
- 1948: Una atrevida aventurita
- 1948: Los pulpos
- 1948: Novio, marido y amante
- 1949: ¿Por qué mintió la cigüeña?
- 1949: La otra y yo
- 1949: Yo no elegí mi vida
- 1949: Miguitas en la cama
- 1949: Morir en su ley
- 1949: The Trap
- 1949: El extraño caso de la mujer asesinada
- 1949: Un pecado por mes
- 1949: Un hombre solo no vale nada
- 1950: Juan Mondiola
- 1950: Valentina
- 1950: ¿Vendrás a medianoche?
- 1950: Arroz con leche
- 1950: Filomena Marturano
- 1951: The Goddess of Rio Beni
- 1950: Cinco locos en la pista
- 1950: Cuando besa mi marido
- 1950: No me digas adiós
- 1950: Abuso de confianza
- 1950: Sacachispas
- 1951: El complejo de Felipe
- 1951: La mujer del león
- 1951: Cartas de amor
- 1951: Reportaje en el infierno
- 1951: Volver a la vida
- 1951: Martín Pescador
- 1951: Una noche cualquiera
- 1951: La comedia inmortal
- 1951: De turno con la muerte
- 1952: Mi hermano Esopo (Historia de un Mateo)
- 1953: El muerto es un vivo
- 1954: Río Turbio
- 1954: María Magdalena
- 1955: El festín de Satanás
- 1955: Marianela
- 1955: Canario rojo
- 1955: Concierto para una lágrima
- 1957: La sombra de Safo
- 1958: Hombres salvajes
- 1959: Culpas ajenas
