= Olga Nethersole =

English actress and health educator (1866–1951)

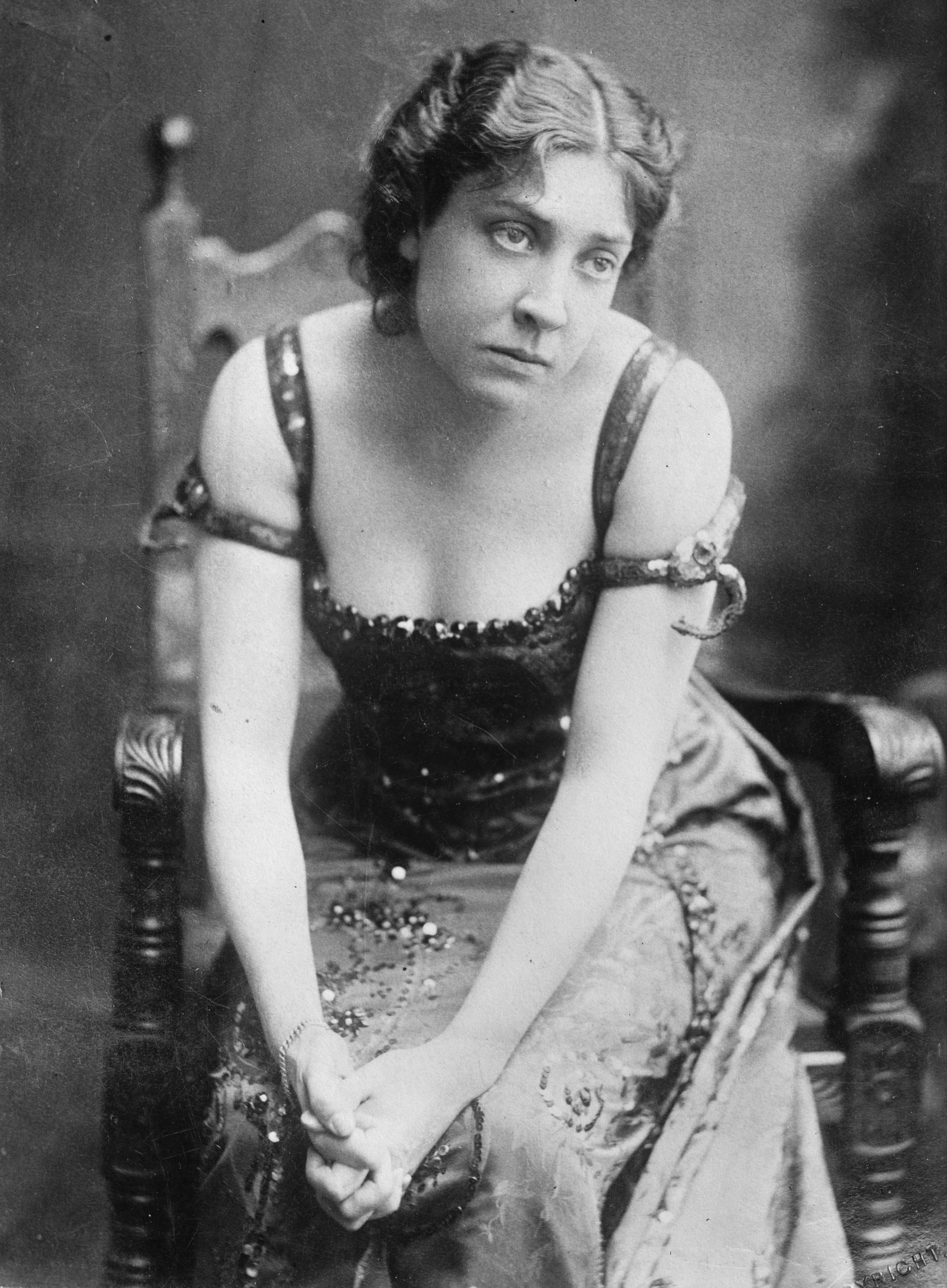
- Born: Olga Isabella Nethersole; 18 January 1866; London, England
- Died: 9 January 1951 (aged 84); Bournemouth, England
- Occupations: Actress, producer, nurse, educator
- Years active: 1887-1951

Olga Isabella Nethersole, CBE, RRC (18 January 1866 – 9 January 1951) was an English actress, theatre producer, and wartime nurse and health educator.

== Career ==
Olga Isabella Nethersole was born in London, of Spanish descent on her mother's side. Her step-father was Henry Nethersole, a solicitor. She made her stage début at Theatre Royal, Brighton in 1887. In 1888, Nethersole began playing important parts in London, at first under Rutland Barrington and John Hare at the Garrick Theatre.

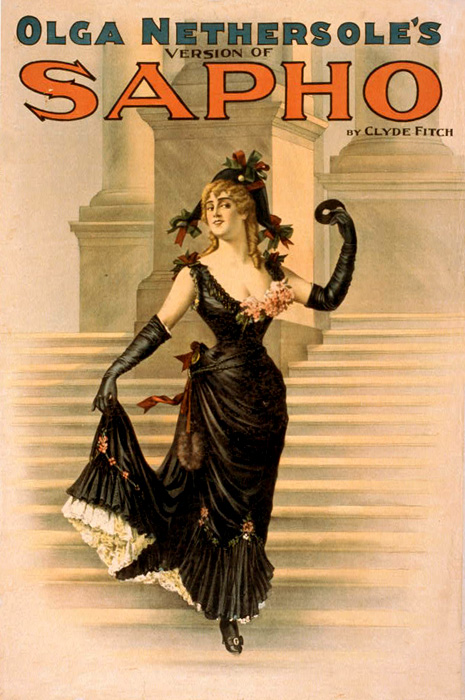
Poster for the Clyde Fitch play, Sapho

Nethersole toured Australia and the United States playing leading parts in modern plays, notably Clyde Fitch's Sapho, where she and her male costar Hamilton Revelle were arrested for "violating public decency" for which she was later acquitted. Her powerful emotional acting, however, made a great effect in some other plays, such as Carmen, in which she again appeared in America in 1906.

In 1904, Nethersole portrayed the lead role in La seconde madame Tanqueray at the Odéon-Théâtre de l'Europe in Paris. Then she was at the Théâtre Sarah-Bernhardt in Magda, Sapho, Adrienne Lecouvreur, and an adaptation of a French play by Eugène Scribe and Ernest Legouvé, Camille, an adaptation of a French play La Dame aux Camélias, and The Spanish Gipsy, an adaptation of the French play Carmen de Mérimée in 1907. Every summer, Nethersole spent a week at the house of playwright Edmond Rostand in Cambo les Bains. In 1907, she performed Rostand’s play La Samaritaine an English version of it to play it in London. In a conference at the Théâtre de l'Athénée on 17 November 1908, Robert Eude said that Olga Nethersole invented the soul kiss (an especially long kiss, of which actress Maude Adams was the recordwoman).

Nethersole inspired the character of "Miss Nethersoll", an American dancer, in the French novel La Danseuse nue et la Dame a la licorne by Rachel Gaston-Charles (1908).

=== World War I and later years ===
During World War I, Nethersole served as a nurse in London and later established the People's League of Health, for which she received the Royal Red Cross (RRC) in 1920. She combined her theatre work with health work for the rest of her life. She was created a Commander of the Order of the British Empire (CBE) in 1936.

== Death ==
On 9 January 1951, Nethersole died in Bournemouth, England at the age of 84. Her brother, Louis F. Nethersole, was a theatrical manager, producer and press agent and one-time husband of the American actress and singer, Sadie Martinot.

== Selected stage roles ==
- Mary Magdalene, 5 December 1910 - December 1910
- The Writing on the Wall, 26 April 1909 - May 1909
- The Enigma, 8 February 1908 - 1 March 1908
- I Pagliacci, 8 February 1908 - 1 March 1908
- Sapho, 1908

== Legacy ==
Between 1885 and 1890, Olga Nethersole’s portrait was painted in Omaha, Nebraska by artist Herbert A. Collins.
