= Yesterday Was Spring =

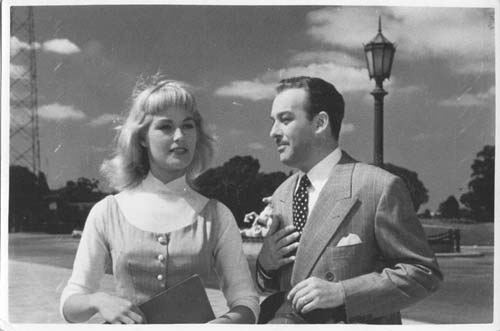
- Roberto Escalada and Analía Gadé
- Directed by: Fernando Ayala
- Written by: Rodolfo M. Taboada
- Starring: Roberto Escalada
- Release date: 20 October 1955
- Country: Argentina
- Language: Spanish

Yesterday Was Spring (Spanish: Ayer fue primavera) is a 1955 Argentine drama film directed by Fernando Ayala and written by Rodolfo M. Taboada.

The film stars Roberto Escalada as a businessman.

== Cast ==
- Oswaldo Cabrera
- Roberto Escalada
- Analía Gadé
- Carmen Giménez
- José Guisone
- Panchito Lombard
- Víctor Martucci
- Duilio Marzio
- Carmen Monteleone
- Jesús Pampín
- Tomás Simari
- Marcelo Sola
- Orestes Soriani
- Armando de Vicente
- Emilio Vieyra
- Aída Villadeamigo

== Release ==
The film premiered on 20 October 1955.
