= Yo maté a Facundo =

- Directed by: Hugo del Carril
- Written by: Isaac Aisemberg; Hugo del Carril
- Starring: Federico Luppi; José María Gutiérrez
- Release date: 1975
- Running time: 90 minutes
- Country: Argentina
- Language: Spanish

Yo maté a Facundo is a 1975 Argentine historical drama film directed by Hugo del Carril. The plot is a fictionalized account about Argentine outlaw Santos Pérez, leader of the gang that murdered La Rioja's caudillo Facundo Quiroga in 1835.

== Cast ==
- Federico Luppi as Santos Pérez
- José María Gutiérrez as Juncos
- Norma Sebré as Rosario
- Carlos Cores as Facundo Quiroga
