= O Menino e o Vento =

1967 Brazilian romantic drama film by Carlos Hugo Christensen

- Directed by: Carlos Hugo Christensen
- Written by: Carlos Hugo Christensen Millor Fernandes (dialogue) Aníbal Machado (story)
- Release date: 1967
- Country: Brazil
- Language: Brazilian Portuguese

O Menino E O Vento (The Boy And The Wind) is a 1967 Brazilian romantic drama film directed and written by Carlos Hugo Christensen based upon a story by Aníbal Machado.

== Plot ==
José Roberto is a young engineer who takes a vacation to the distant village of Bela Vista, in the interior of Minas Gerais, known for its strong winds. He has been fascinated by the phenomenon of wind since his childhood, and his passion and affinity for it is recognized by Zeca da Curva. The two become inseparable during the engineer's 28-day vacation, and they wander the hills searching for ever-stronger winds. Upon returning to the city, José Roberto finds that he has been accused of the disappearance and supposed death of Zeca da Curva, who had not been seen since José's departure.

== Cast ==
- Ênio Gonçalves as José Roberto Nery (engineer)
- Wilma Henriques as Laura (hotel owner)
- Luiz Fernando Ianelli as Zeca da Curva
- Odilon Azevedo as Jorge (clerk)
- Germano Filho as Roberto's attorney
- Oscar Felipe as Mário (Zeca's wealthy cousin)
- Palmira Barbosa as Maria Amália (Zeca's mother)
- Antônio Naddêo as Promotor (Zeca's attorney)
- Jotta Barroso as a courtroom employee
- Armando Rosas as a judge
- Antônia Marzullo as índia (Zeca's grandfather)
- Thales Penna as Aparecido Telles (ranch hand)
- Amiris Veronese as a train passenger
- Míriam Pereira as Isaura (Espiga de Milho) (Zeca's girlfriend)

Source: Cinemateca Brasileira

== Production ==
The script was written by Christensen, based on the story "O Iniciado do Vento" by Aníbal Machado. Christensen discovered the story in a book titled Poemas em Prosa (Poems in Prose) in a São Paulo bookstore. After reading the story, he became friends with the author, whom he would call "one of the greatest poets in Latin America". According to Christensen, Aníbal's stories possess "an essentially cinematographic conception" and that "the great poet that he was is present in all of them". It has been described as one of the earliest representations of male homosexuality in Brazilian cinema.

The film recordings took place in Visconde do Rio Branco, in the Zona de Mata region of Minas Gerais. After getting positive reception from the mayor of the city, the film was shown outdoors in the main square.

For the cast, Christensen wanted to work with "newcomer" actors, and after the inclusion of Ênio Gonçalves and actor Luiz Fernando Ianelli, Christensen invited Alba Veronese, who had already worked on international projects but was unknown to Brazilian cinema. Over 300 boys auditioned for Ianelli's role; he received numerous accolades for his performance, though attention was drawn to an incident where he refused to allow the use of a stunt double in a scene where he mounts a horse.

== Release and reception ==
The film received mixed reception. It was nominated for Best Film at the Teresópolis Festival, where Christensen won Best Director. Critic Rogério Costa Rodrigues described the film in Correio Braziliense as frustrating, and wrote that the subject matter needed to be "captured in its exact dimensions", something that he did not think was achieved. The Boy and the Wind was selected to represent Brazil at the 1967 Venice Film Festival, but it was rejected by the festival's director Luigi Chiarini on the grounds that the film was "old and unimportant" and that it would be "impossible to admit a film full of useless ideas to a festival that aims to open its doors to young, controversial and dynamic cinema".

The film was shown in February 1970 as part of an exhibit on Brazilian cinema at the National Film Theatre in London under the auspices of the British Film Institute. The film was also shown in June 2026 at the Barbican as part of their "Queer 60's" season.
