= Asalto a la ciudad =

1968 film by Carlos Cores

- Book cover version
- Directed by: Carlos Cores
- Written by: Carlos Cores; Guillermo Haro
- Produced by: David Yohai Varon
- Starring: Carlos Cores; Santiago Gómez Cou; Olga Zubarry
- Cinematography: Alfredo Traverso
- Edited by: Ricardo Rodríguez Nistal; Higinio Vecchione
- Music by: Juan Ehlert
- Release date: 3 March 1968
- Running time: 95 minutes
- Country: Argentina
- Language: Spanish

Asalto a la ciudad (English language: Assault on the City) is a 1968 Argentine black and white crime film directed and written by Carlos Cores who also starred with Santiago Gómez Cou and Olga Zubarry. The film premiered on 3 March 1968 in Buenos Aires. The film is based upon a crime novel.

== Premise ==
Five men who rob a bank will ultimately face their punishment.

== Cast ==
- Agustín Barrios
- Guillermo Battaglia
- Osvaldo Brandi .... Empleado de inmobiliaria
- Pedro Buchardo
- José Comellas
- Carlos Cores .... Antonio
- Silvia del Río .... Singer
- Thelma del Río
- Roberto Germán
- Santiago Gómez Cou...as himself
- Saul Jarlip
- Elizabeth Killian .... Antonio's Wife
- Aída Luz .... Julian's Mother
- Sergio Malbrán
- Susana Mayo
- Juan José Miguez .... Rodolfo
- Inés Murray
- Juan Carlos Palma
- Nathán Pinzón
- Ignacio Quirós .... Julian
- Sergio Renán .... Ernesto
- Raúl Ricutti .... Pasajero en colectivo
- Joe Rígoli
- Semillita .... Pasajero en colectivo
- Luis Tasca .... Nicolas
- Olga Zubarry .... Nicolas's Wife
