= Carlos Cores =

Argentine actor & director (1923–2000)

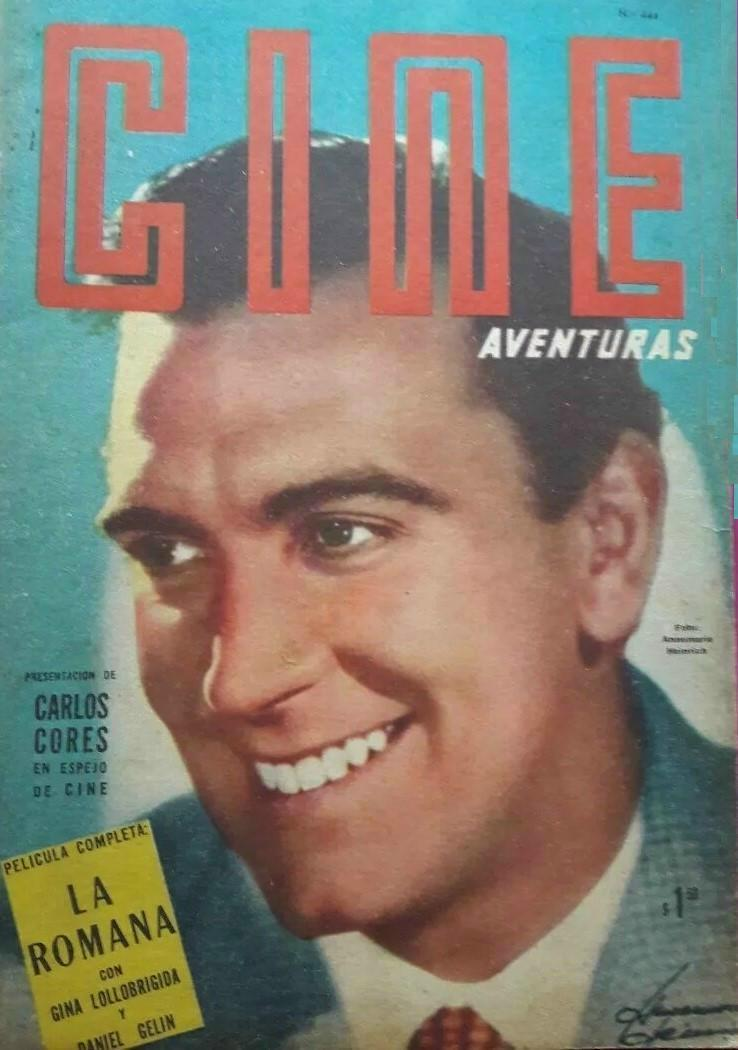
Carlos Cores by Annemarie Heinrich, Cine Aventuras 1955

Carlos Cores (April 19, 1923 – February 8, 2000) was an Argentine film actor, and film director.

== Career ==
Cores entered films in 1939 and starred in over 60 films between then and his retirement in the early 1980s. In 1968 he directed, acted and wrote Asalto a la Ciudad.

== Death ==
He died in 2000, aged 76, in San Fernando, Buenos Aires.

== Filmography ==
=== Director ===
- Asalto en la ciudad (1961)
- Lindor Covas, el cimarrón (1963)
- La ruleta del Diablo/La ciudad de los cuervos (unpublished – 1968)

=== Writer ===
- Asalto en la ciudad (1961)
- Lindor Covas, el cimarrón (1963)

=== Actor ===
- ...Y mañana serán hombres (1939, dir. Carlos Borcosque)
- Yo conocí a esa mujer (1942, dir. Carlos Borcosque)
- El professor Cero (1942, dir. Luis César Amadori)
- Incertidumbre (1942, dir. Carlos Borcosque)
- Un nuevo amanecer (1942, dir. Carlos Borcosque)
- Cada hogar un mundo (1942, dir. Carlos Borcosque)
- Valle negro (1943, dir. Carlos Borcosque)
- La juventud manda (1943, dir. Carlos Borcosque)
- Back in the Seventies (1945, dir. Francisco Mugica)
- Éramos seis (1945, dir. Carlos Borcosque)
- La amarga verdad (1945, Chile, dir. Carlos Borcosque)
- The Lady of Death (1946, dir. Carlos Hugo Christiansen) - Roberto Braun
- The Naked Angel (1946, dir. Carlos Hugo Christiansen) - Mario
- Esperanza (1946, dir. Francisco Mugica y Eduardo Boneo)
- Siete para un secreto (1947, dir. Carlos Borcosque)
- La gran tentación (1948, dir. Ernesto Arancibia)
- Tierras hechizadas (inédita - 1948, dir. Emilio Guerineau)
- Hipólito, el de Santa (1950, México, dir. Fernando de Fuentes)
- Hombres a precio (1949, dir. Bernardo Spoliansky)
- Nuestras vidas (1950, México, dir. Ramón Peón) - Raúl / Armando
- La malcasada (1950, México, dir. José Díaz Morales)
- Curvas peligrosas (1950, México, dir. Tito Davison)
- El ciclón del Caribe (1950, México, dir. Ramón Pereda)
- Mi vida por la tuya (1951, dir. Roberto Gavaldón) - Andrés Alberti
- Women Without Tomorrow (1951, México, dir. Tito Daviison) - Antonio
- María Cristina (1951, México, dir. Ramón Pereda)
- Paco the Elegant (1952, México, dir. Adolfo Fernández Bustamante) - Miguel Labra
- Enseñame a besar (1952, México, dir. Tito Davison) - Eduardo
- La Parda Flora (1952, dir. León Klimovsky)
- La Muerte en las calles (1952, dir. Leo Fleider)
- Del otro lado del puente (1953, dir. Carlos Rinaldi) - Roberto Aguirre
- El grito sagrado (1954, dir. Luis César Amadori) - Martin Thompson
- Guacho (1954, dir. Luis César Amadori)
- The Man Who Owed a Death (1955, dir. Mario Soffici) - Héctor Rossi
- Love Never Dies (1955, dir. Luis César Amadori)
- El Juramento de Lagardere (1955, dir. León Klimovsky)
- Sangre y acero (1956, dir. Lucas Demare) - Tomás
- El último perro (1955, dir. Lucas Demare) - Narrator (uncredited)
- Los tallos amargos (1956, dir. Fernando Ayala) - Alfredo Gasper
- El diablo de vacaciones (unfinished - 1957, dir. Ferruccio Cerio)
- Mi mujer necesita marido (1959, México, dir. Rolando Aguilar) - Ricardo
- La mujer y la bestia (1959, México, dir. Alfonso Corona Blake) - Dr. Enrique Molina
- Vivir del cuento (1960, México, dir. Rafael Baledón) - Renato del Valle
- Una canción para recordar (1960, México, dir. Julio Bracho)
- Las canciones unidas (1960, México, dir. Julio Bracho y Tito Davison)
- Male and Female Since Adam and Eve (1961, United States, dir. Carlos Rinaldi) - Robert
- En busca de la muerte (1961, México, dir. Zacarías Gómez Urquiza)
- Mate Cosido (1962, dir. Goffredo Alessandrini)
- Accidente 703 (1962, dir. José María Forqué) - Julio
- Detrás de la mentira (1962, dir. Emilio Vieyra) - Agustín García Casas
- Rumbos malditos (inédita - 1962, dir. Goffredo Alessandrini)
- Lindor Covas, el cimarrón (1963, dir. Carlos Cores) - Lindor Covas
- La fin del mundo (1963, dir. Emilio Vieyra)
- Curse of the Stone Hand (1964, Estados Unidos, dir. Carlos Hugo Christiansen y Jerry Warren)
- Una excursión a los indios ranqueles (unfinished - 1965, dir. Derlis Beccaglia)
- Asalto en la ciudad (1968, dir. Carlos Cores) - Antonio Fernández
- La ciudad de los cuervos (unpublished - 1969, dir. Carlos Cores)
- Yo maté a Facundo (1975, dir. Hugo del Carril) - Facundo Quiroga
