= Guillermo Battaglia =

Argentine actor (1899–1988)

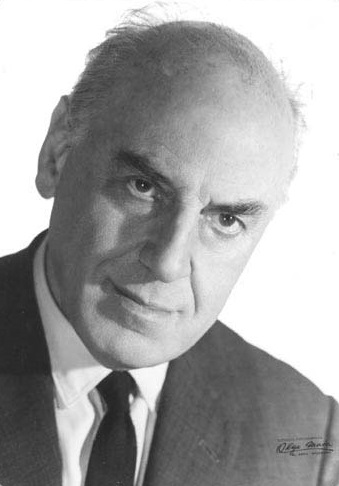
- Battaglia in 1972.
- Born: December 7, 1899; Buenos Aires, Argentina
- Died: September 26, 1988 (aged 88)
- Years active: 1937–1987

Guillermo Battaglia (December 7, 1899 – September 26, 1988) was a prolific Argentine film actor of the classic era of Argentine cinema.

Born in Buenos Aires, he began his film career in 1937 in Melodías porteñas. Battaglia starred in over 100 films, between then and 1987. He was one of the most prolific supporting actors during this entire period, notably in Roberto Cossa's La nona (1979), David Lipszyc's Volver (1982), Alberto Fischerman's Los días de junio (1985), and the Best foreign film oscar-winning The Official Story in 1985.

He died of a heart attack in September 1988.

== Personal life ==
He was married to Argentine actress Nora Cullen.

== Selected filmography ==
- Melodías porteñas (1937)
- Villa Discordia (1938)
- La Novia de los forasteros (1942)
- Locos de verano (1942)
- Todo un hombre (1943)
- Safo, historia de una pasión (1943) .... Caudal
- His Best Student (1944)
- The Corpse Breaks a Date (1944) .... Doctor Emilio Quiroga
- The Abyss Opens (1945)
- Las seis suegras de Barba Azul (1945)
- Stella (1945)
- Viaje sin regreso (1946)
- Camino del infierno (1946) .... Dr.Mas
- The Lady of Death (1946) .... Hugo Clinton
- The Maharaja's Diamond (1946)
- The Naked Angel (1946) .... Guillermo Lagos Renard
- Encrucijada (1947)
- Los Verdes paraísos (1947)
- El que recibe las bofetadas (1947)
- La Muerte camina en la lluvia (1948) .... Boris Andreieff
- Con el diablo en el cuerpo (1947)
- Como tú lo soñaste (1947)
- La Dama del collar (1948)
- A Story of the Nineties (1949) .... 'Pardo' Márquez
- Yo no elegí mi vida (1949)
- Las Aventuras de Jack (1949)
- El Hijo de la calle (1949)
- Filomena Marturano (1950)
- ¿Vendrás a media noche? (1950)
- la Fuerza ciega (1950)
- El Regreso (1950) .... Diablo
- Mi vida por la tuya (1951) .... Francisco Aguirre
- Tierra extraña (1951)
- The Unwanted (1951)
- La Bestia debe morir (1952) .... Jorge Rattery
- Deshonra (1952) .... Prison Inspector
- Un Guapo del 900 (1952)
- Acorralada (1953)
- Los Troperos (1953)
- Los Tres mosquiteros (1953)
- Caídos en el infierno (1954)
- Siete gritos en el mar (1954)
- Mi viudo y yo (1954)
- Vida nocturna (1955)
- Los Hampones (1955)
- La Novia (1955)
- Codicia (1955)
- Bendita seas (1956) .... Francisco Arguello
- Section des disparus (1956) .... Le commissaire de police
- El Protegido (1956) .... Vañasco
- Después del silencio (1956)
- La Casa del ángel (1957) .... Dr. Castro, Father of Ana
- La Bestia humana (1957)
- Dagli Appennini alle Ande (1959)
- The Candidate (1959)
- Angustia de un secreto (1959)
- Los Acusados (1960)
- Yo quiero vivir contigo (1960)
- La Potranca (1960)
- Don Frutos Gómez (1961)
- The Romance of a Gaucho (1961)
- Buscando a Mónica (1962) .... Padre de Mónica
- La Cigarra no es un bicho (1964) .... Doctor
- Pesadilla (1963)
- Viaje al más allá, Un (1964)
- Los evadidos (1964)
- El Gordo Villanueva (1964)
- Proceso à la conciencia (1964)
- El Club del clan (1964)
- Los Hipócritas (1965)
- Ritmo nuevo y vieja ola (1965) .... Quiroga
- Mi primera novia (1965) .... Don Faustino
- Canuto Cañete, detective privado (1965) .... Carranza
- Hotel alojamiento (1966)
- Fuego en la sangre (1966)
- Una Máscara para Ana (1966)
- I Need a Mother (1966)
- El Hombre invisible ataca (1967) .... Police Chief
- Patapufete! (1967) .... Wise Russian
- Asalto a la ciudad (1968)
- Story of a Poor Young Man (1968) .... Santiago Quijano
- El Novicio rebelde (1968) .... Ricardo Fernandez
- Deliciosamente amoral (1969)
- Los muchachos de antes no usaban gomina (1969)
- El Día que me quieras (1969) .... Don Ramon Quiroga
- Amalio Reyes, un hombre (1970)
- Joven, viuda y estanciera (1970)
- Intimidades de una cualquiera (1972) .... Antonio
- Destino de un capricho (1972)
- Hipólito y Evita (1973)
- La Mary (1974) .... Doctor
- La Nona (1979)
- Los Viernes de la eternidad (1981) .... Don Tobías Abud
- La Conquista del paraíso (1981) .... The father
- Volver (1982)
- La Espera (1983, Short)
- Noches sin lunas ni soles (1984) .... Sr. Bertozzi
- La Historia oficial (1985) .... Jose
- Los Días de junio (1985)
- Miss Mary (1986) .... Grandfather
- Sentimientos: Mirta de Liniers a Estambul (1987) .... (final film role)
