= The Eternal Sapho =

1916 film

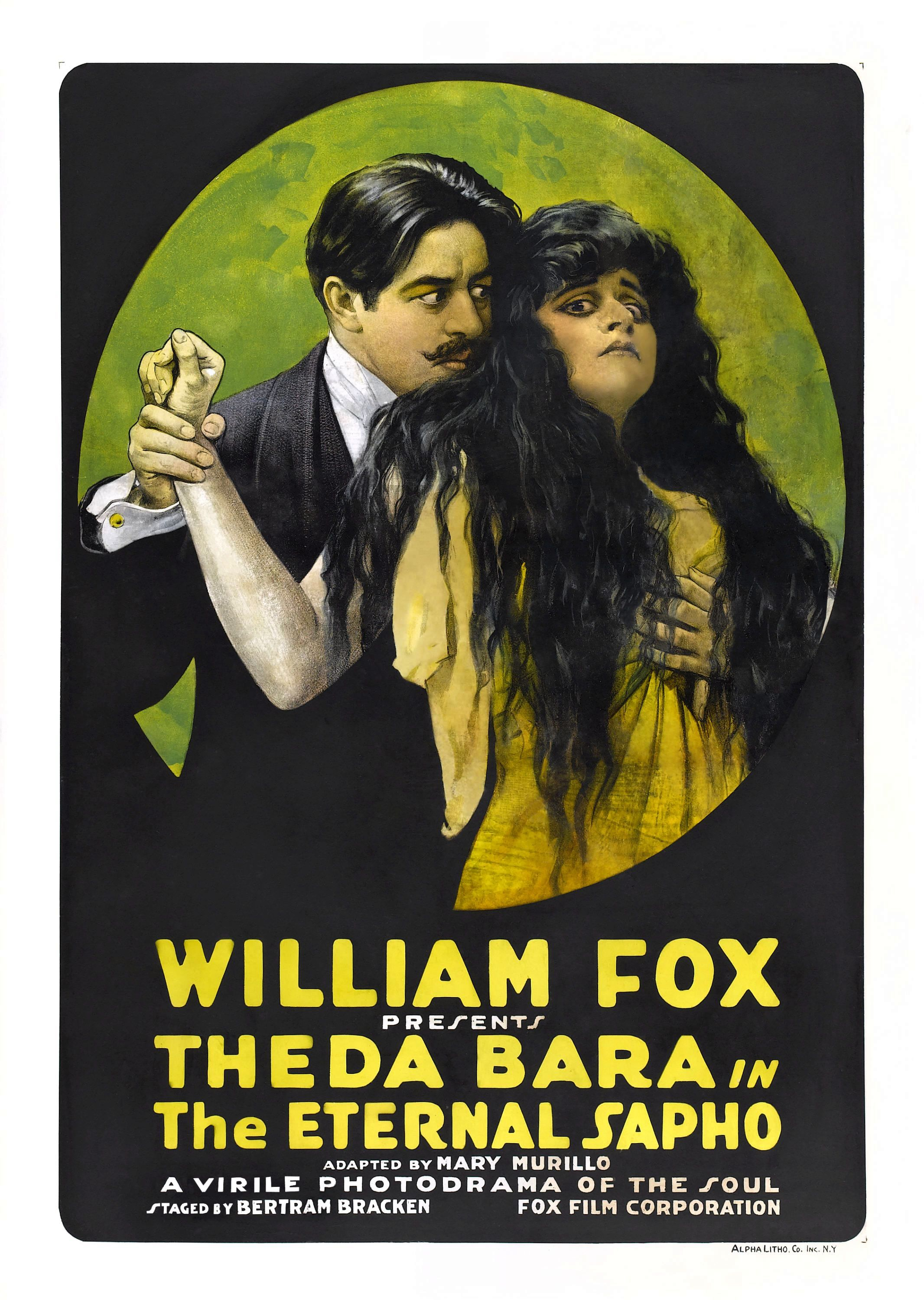
- Theatrical poster to The Eternal Sapho likenesses of Theda Bara and Warner Oland
- Directed by: Bertram Bracken
- Written by: Mary Murillo (scenario)
- Based on: Sappho by Alphonse Daudet
- Produced by: William Fox
- Starring: Theda Bara; James Cooley
- Cinematography: Rial Schellinger
- Distributed by: Fox Film Corporation
- Release date: May 7, 1916
- Running time: 50 minutes
- Country: United States
- Language: Silent (English intertitles)

The Eternal Sapho (also known as A Modern Sapho and The Eternal Sappho) is a 1916 American silent drama film directed by Bertram Bracken and starring Theda Bara. The film was loosely based on the 1884 French novel Sappho by Alphonse Daudet. The film is now considered lost.

The Eternal Sapho was produced by Fox Film Corporation and shot at the Fox Studio in Fort Lee, New Jersey. Some filming took place at the Marble House, a mansion located on a hill above 215th Street in New York.

== Cast ==
- Theda Bara as Laura Bruffins
- James Cooley as Billy Malvin
- Walter Lewis as Mr. Marvin Sr.
- Hattie Delaro as Mrs. Marvin Sr.
- Einar Linden as John Drummond
- Mary Martin as Mrs. Drummond
- Kittens Reichert as Drummond Child
- George MacQuarrie as Jack McCullough
- Warner Oland as H. Coudal
- Frank Norcross as Grubbins
- Caroline Harris as Mother Grubbins

== See also ==
- List of lost films
- 1937 Fox vault fire
- List of Fox Film films
