= La muerte camina en la lluvia =

- Directed by: Carlos Hugo Christensen
- Written by: Based upon the novel L'assassin habite au 21
- Starring: Olga Zubarry; Guillermo Battaglia; Eduardo Cuitiño; Amalia Sánchez Ariño; Nicolás Fregues
- Music by: George Andreani
- Production company: Lumiton
- Release date: 7 September 1948
- Running time: 73 minutes
- Country: Argentina
- Language: Spanish

La muerte camina en la lluvia (English: The death walks in the rain) is a 1948 Argentine suspense film of the classical era of Argentine cinema, directed by Carlos Hugo Christensen and based upon the novel L'assassin habite au 21 written by Stanislas-André Steeman. It premiered on September 7, 1948.

In a survey of the 100 greatest films of Argentine cinema carried out by the Museo del Cine Pablo Ducrós Hicken in 2000, the film reached the 35th position.

== Plot ==
A series of seven mysterious murders frightens Buenos Aires, all the crimes are committed during rainy days.

== Cast ==
In alphabetical order

- Pablo Acciardi ... Merlín
- Alfredo Alaria ... Joven en la prueba de magia
- Alberto Barcel ... Policía
- Guillermo Battaglia ... Boris Andreieff
- Angel Boffa ... Barquinazo
- Juan Corona ... Lamas
- Margarita Corona ... Valeria Duval
- Eduardo Cuitiño ... Lima
- Roberto Escalada ... Relator
- Nicolás Fregues ... Doctor Robledo
- Ramón J. Garay ...Conserje
- Agustín Orrequia ... Camelio Vargas
- Carlos Perelli ... Norton
- Horacio Peterson ... Lucho Rivas
- Amalia Sánchez Ariño ... Sra. Vargas
- Orestes Soriani ... Doctor Kaplan
- Olga Zubarry ... Lila Espinoza

== See also ==
- The Murderer Lives at Number 21 (1942)
