= Don't Ever Open That Door =

1952 film

- Theatrical release poster
- Directed by: Carlos Hugo Christensen
- Written by: Cornell Woolrich (stories); Alejandro Casona
- Starring: Ángel Magana; Roberto Escalada; Norma Giménez
- Cinematography: Pablo Tabernero
- Edited by: José Gallego
- Music by: Julián Bautista
- Production company: Estudios San Miguel
- Release date: 1952
- Running time: 85 minutes
- Country: Argentina
- Language: Spanish

Don't Ever Open That Door (Spanish: No abras nunca esa puerta) is a 1952 Argentine thriller film of the classical era directed by Carlos Hugo Christensen and starring Ángel Magana, Roberto Escalada and Norma Giménez. It is a film noir anthology film based on two short stories by Cornell Woolrich, namely "Somebody on the Phone" and "Humming Bird Comes Home".

The film's sets were designed by the art director Gori Muñoz.

It was included in the 2022 list of The 100 Greatest Films of Argentine Cinema at number 45, a poll organized by the specialized magazine La vida útil, Taipei and La tierra quema, which was presented at the Mar del Plata International Film Festival.

== Plot ==
1. Anguish - A rich man's sister is having trouble due to gambling debts. She will not tell him who is calling her, using a code of letting the phone ring five times before hanging up and calling back as a signal. He tries to help her but she commits suicide before he can determine exactly what is happening. He tracks down a man he has seen her talking to in a bar, who he presumes is her blackmailer. After he kills the man, who says he was only trying to help the sister, the phone rings five times as he looks on in confusion and disbelief.

2. Pain. A blind woman lives with her young niece who assists her. The blind woman is very astute at using her other senses to determine what is going on around her. She misses her son who left eight years prior. Meanwhile, a man who whistles a familiar tune as he robs a jewelry store with two accomplices, kills the store owner while escaping with the stolen goods. The police announce this robbery on the radio, noting that the criminal whistles while robbing and murdering. He goes to the blind woman's house with his two accomplices, and one of them dies while there. Soon, we realize that the leader is the missing son. The blind woman realizes her son has gone bad when he whistles the tune known to be used by the robber. At night, as the thugs sleep, she goes through the house removing keys and stealing their guns from their bedsides in a long, suspenseful sequence. She has her young niece remove all the fuses from the fuse-box to make it dark in the house, and sends her to get help. In leaving by car, she rouses one of the thugs who wakes the son, and the criminals go to the top of the stairs. Using a flashlight, the two thugs see the woman, and when one goes to shoot her with his hidden gun, a scuffle ensues. One man falls to the landing below, dead, the other comes down the stairs to the mother while whistling and whispers, "I'll follow the good path." Appearing to believe it is her son, she lets him go. The niece returns, and it is discovered that it is the son who is dead on the landing and his accomplice who escaped. The niece covers the son's face with her head scarf, repeating that he is now on "the good path."

== Cast ==
- Ángel Magana
- Roberto Escalada
- Ilde Pirovano
- Nicolás Fregues
- Arnoldo Chamot as Camarero
- Carlos D'Agostino as Relator radial
- Diana de Córdoba
- Rafael Diserio
- Renée Dumas
- Pedro Fiorito
- Norma Giménez
- Rosa Martín
- Luis Mora
- Percival Murray as Policia
- Luis Otero
- Alberto Quiles
- Orestes Soriani as Gerente de banco

== Preservation ==
Don't Ever Open That Door (also translated from its Spanish title to Never Open That Door) was preserved and restored by the UCLA Film & Television Archive from a 35mm dupe picture negative, a 35mm subtitled print and a 16mm print. Restoration funding was provided by the Golden Globe Foundation and the Film Noir Foundation. The restoration was screened at the 2024 UCLA Festival of Preservation.

== Bibliography ==
- Spicer, Andrew. Historical Dictionary of Film Noir. Scarecrow Press, 2010.
