= Carlos Hugo Christensen =

Argentine director, screenwriter and producer

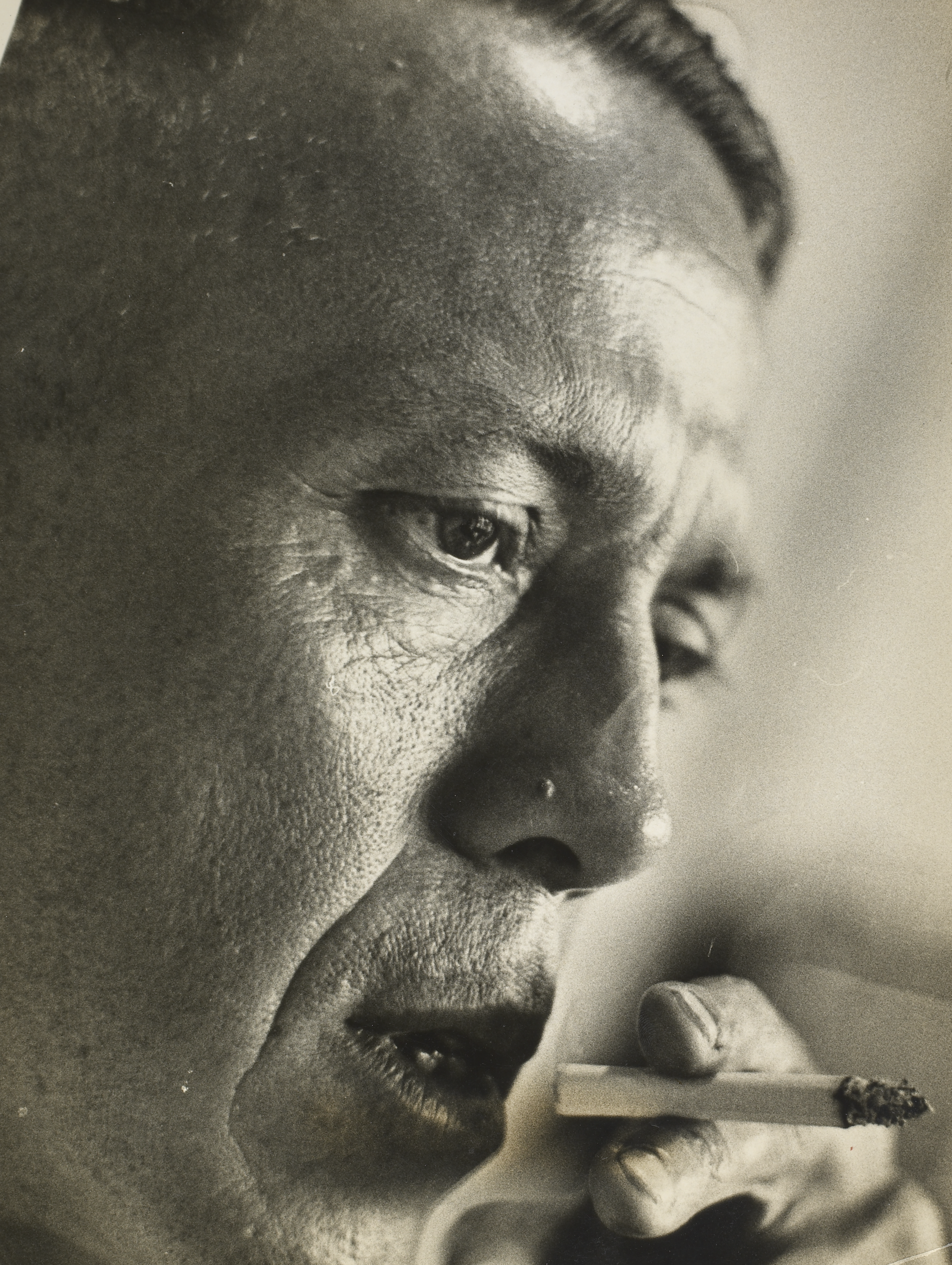
Carlos Hugo Christensen, 1964

Carlos Hugo Christensen (15 December 1914 in Santiago del Estero, Argentina – 30 November 1999 in Rio de Janeiro) was an Argentine film director, screenwriter and film producer, an iconic figure of the classical era of Argentine cinema.

== Career ==
He was of Danish descent through his paternal side. Christensen directed fifty-four feature films some of which are considered masterpieces of what is known as the Argentine golden era of cinema. Si Muero antes de despertar (If I Should Die Before I Wake) and No abras nunca esa puerta (Never Open That Door), were part of a retrospective at the Museum of Modern Art in New York in 2016. In both films, known for their exquisite cinematography, Christensen was assisted by the renowned director of photography Pablo Tabernero.

In the mid-1950s he relocated to Brazil where he established his own film studio, Carlos Hugo Christensen Produções Cinematográficas.

He died on November 30, 1999, in his home in Rio de Janeiro, At the time he was working on La casa de azúcar (The Sugar House), The unfinished film was based on a short story by Silvina Ocampo.

== Filmography ==
As director

- El buque embotellado (1939)
- The Englishman of the Bones (1940)
- White Eagle (1941)
- La novia de primavera (1942)
- Locos de verano(1942)
- Noche de bodas (1942)
- Los chicos crecen (1942)
- Safo, historia de una pasión (1943)
- Sixteen (1943)
- La pequeña señora de Pérez (1944)
- Las seis suegras de Barba Azul (1945)
- Swan Song (1945)
- La señora de Pérez se divorcia (1945)
- The Lady of Death (1946)
- Adán y la serpiente (1946)
- The Naked Angel (1946)
- Los verdes paraísos (1947)
- Con el diablo en el cuerpo (1947)
- Una atrevida aventurita (1948)
- Los pulpos (1948)
- La muerte camina en la lluvia (1948)
- ¿Por qué mintió la cigüeña? (1949)
- The Yacht Isabel Arrived This Afternoon (1949)
- The Trap (1949)
- El demonio es un ángel (1950)
- Si muero antes de despertar (1952)
- No abras nunca esa puerta (1952)
- Black Ermine (1953)
- Un ángel sin pudor (1953)
- María Magdalena (1954)
- Mãos Sangrentas (1955)
- Leonora of the Seven Seas (1955)
- Matemática Zero, Amor Dez (1958)
- Amor para Três (1958)
- Three Loves in Rio (1959)
- Esse Rio que Eu Amo (1960)
- O Rei Pelé (1962)
- Viagem aos Seios de Duília (1964)
- Crônica da Cidade Amada (1964)
- Bossa Nova (1964)
- O Menino e o Vento (1967)
- Como Matar um Playboy (1968)
- Anjos e Demônios (1970)
- Uma Pantera em Minha Cama (1971)
- Caingangue (1973)
- A Mulher do Desejo (1975)
- Enigma para Demônios (1975)
- Runnin' After Love (1978)
- A Intrusa (1979)
- Runnin' After Love (1980)
- ¿Somos? (1982)
- A Casa de Açúcar (1996)
