= Black Ermine =

1953 film by Carlos Hugo Christensen

- Directed by: Carlos Hugo Christensen
- Written by: Rafael Maluenda; Pedro Juan Vignalle
- Starring: Laura Hidalgo; Roberto Escalada
- Cinematography: Ricardo Younis
- Edited by: Jorge Gárate
- Music by: Julián Bautista
- Production company: Argentina Sono Film
- Release date: 27 August 1953
- Running time: 104 minutes
- Country: Argentina
- Language: Spanish

Black Ermine (Spanish:Armiño negro) is a 1953 Argentine romantic film of the classical era of Argentine cinema, directed by Carlos Hugo Christensen and starring Laura Hidalgo and Roberto Escalada.

The film's sets were designed by the art director Gori Muñoz. It was made by Argentina Sono Film, the country's largest production company. The film is set in Peru, and location filming took place there.

== Synopsis ==
In the Peruvian capital of Lima, an attractive woman maintains a luxurious lifestyle by taking a series of wealthy lovers. When her son returns from school she takes him on a holiday to Cuzco to see the site of Machu Picchu. While there she meets and falls in love with an Argentine painter, who her son admires greatly. On returning to Lima, she distances herself from her former lovers including a bullfighter who is infatuated by her. But, heavily in debt, she decides to spend a final night with one of her suitors in order to pay off her bills, but with tragic consequences for her relationship with her son.

== Cast ==
- Enrique Abeledo
- Roberto Escalada
- Gloria Ferrandiz
- Aurelia Ferrer
- Nicolás Fregues
- Ricardo Galache
- Laura Hidalgo
- Federico Mansilla
- Bernardo Perrone
- Néstor Zavarce
