= Alfredo Traverso =

Alfredo Traverso (c. 1910–1980) was a prolific Argentine cinematographer who worked on over 70 films in the Cinema of Argentina between 1940 and 1970.

He worked on cinematography on films such as El Asalto (1960), in which he worked with Austrian director Kurt Land, and Asalto a la ciudad (1968), one of his last films in which he worked with Carlos Cores.

== Partial filmography ==
- Honeymoon in Rio (1940)
- A Light in the Window (1942)
- The Minister's Daughter (1943)
- Swan Song (1945)
- The Lady of Death (1946)
- The Naked Angel (1946)
- The Trap (1949)
- Valentina (1950)
- The Phantom of the Operetta (1955)
- El Asalto (1960)
- Los Días calientes (1966)
- Asalto a la ciudad (1968)
