= The Trap (1949 film) =

- Directed by: Carlos Hugo Christensen
- Written by: José Arturo Pimentel; Carlos Hugo Christensen
- Starring: Zully Moreno; George Rigaud; Juana Sujo; Carlos Thompson
- Cinematography: Alfredo Traverso
- Edited by: Jacobo Spoliansky
- Music by: George Andreani
- Production company: Lumiton
- Distributed by: Lumiton
- Release date: 11 August 1949
- Running time: 92 minutes
- Country: Argentina
- Language: Spanish

The Trap (Spanish: La trampa) is a 1949 Argentine thriller film of the classical era of Argentine cinema, directed by Carlos Hugo Christensen and starring Zully Moreno, George Rigaud, and Juana Sujo. A woman marries a man without understanding the darker depths of his personality.

== Cast ==
- Zully Moreno as Paulina Figueroa
- George Rigaud as Hugo Morán / Paul Deval
- Juana Sujo as Agatha Valle
- Carlos Thompson as Mario Casares
- Juan Corona as Dr. Vargas
- María Santos as Srta. Martín
- María Esther Buschiazzo as Josefina
- Arnoldo Chamot as Relator
- Raquel Notar as Presidenta de la Liga
- André Dumont as Extorsionador
- Mario Caraballo
- Gloria Ferrandiz as Sra. Salcedo

== Bibliography ==
- Rist, Peter H. Historical Dictionary of South American Cinema. Rowman & Littlefield, 2014.
