= Antonio Rampoldi =

- Other name: A. Rampoldi
- Occupation: Editor
- Years active: 1942-1966 (film)

Antonio Rampoldi was an Argentine film editor who worked on around fifty films during his career. Many of these were made during the Golden Age of Argentine Cinema.

== Selected filmography ==
- A Light in the Window (1942)
- The Minister's Daughter (1943)
- Swan Song (1945)
- Valentina (1950)

== Bibliography ==
- Fabbro, Gabriela. Mirtha Legrand: Del Cine a la Televisión: La Perdurabilidad de un Clásico. Universidad Austral, 2006.
