= César Tiempo =

Russian-born Argentine writer (1906-1989)

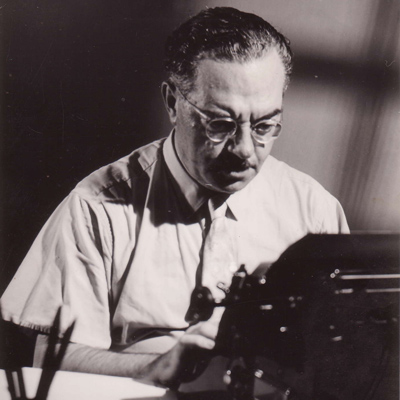
César Tiempo

César Tiempo, born Israel Zeitlin (March 3, 1906 in Yekaterinoslav, Russian Empire (now Dnipro, Ukraine) – October 24, 1980) was a Russian-born screenwriter of Argentine cinema. He wrote the script for award-winning films such as Safo, historia de una pasión (1943). In 1961 he appeared as an actor in Esta tierra es mía.
