= Osvald =

Osvald may refer to:

- Osvald (given name)
- Surname:
  - Hugo Osvald (1892–1970), Swedish botanist and plant ecologist specializing on mire ecology, Sphagnum and peat formation
- Osvald Group, Norwegian sabotage organisation during World War II led by Asbjørn Sunde, who used Osvald as one of his cover names

== See also ==
- Oswald (disambiguation)
