= Oswald (given name) =

Oswald (/ˈɒzwəld/) is a masculine given name, from Old English Osƿeald, from os "god" and ƿeald "rule". The Old High German cognate was Answald, the Old Norse form was Ásvaldr.

Oswald of Northumbria (c. 604–641/2) was a king of Northumbria and is venerated as saint. The name fell out of use in the later medieval period, although it appears to have been rarely given in reference to the saint even in the late 14th century, as evidenced by the name of German poet and diplomat Oswald von Wolkenstein (1376/7–1445). The name was revived in the 19th century, but it was never frequently given. Its popularity in the United States peaked in 1886 at rank 451, and it fell below rank 1,000 in the mid-1930s. By contrast, the Hispanic form Osvaldo became popular in the United States by the 1970s, peaking at rank 410 in 2004.

== People with the given name include ==
- Oswald of Glenluce (died after 1417), Cistercian monk and bishop
- Oswald of Sussex, Anglo-Saxon Ealdorman
- Oswald of Worcester (died 992), Archbishop of York and saint
- Oswald de Andrade (1890–1954), Brazilian writer and poet
- Oswald Achenbach (1827–1905), German landscape painter
- Oswald Thompson Allis (1880–1973), American Presbyterian theologian and Bible scholar
- Oswald Avery (1877–1955), Canadian-American physician, medical researcher and molecular biologist
- Oswald Balzer (1858–1933), Polish historian
- Oswald Barrett (1892–1945), English artist and illustrator
- Oswald Berkhan (1834–1917), German physician
- Oswald Birley (1880–1952), English painter
- Oswald Boelcke (1891–1916), German flying ace of the First World War
- Oswald Bosanquet (1866–1933), British administrator in India
- Oswald Bosko (died 1944), Austrian policeman and a Righteous Among the Nations
- Oswald Walters Brierly (1817–1894), English painter
- Oswald Bumke (1877–1950), German psychiatrist and neurologist
- Oswald Carver (1887–1915), British rower
- Oswald Chambers (1874–1917), Scottish Protestant Christian minister and teacher
- Oswald Cockayne (1807–1873), English churchman and philologist
- Oswald Couldrey (1882–1958), British artist, poet and author
- Oswald d'Andréa (1934–2024), French pianist and composer
- Oswald Leslie De Kretser II (1882–1959), Puisne Justice of Supreme Court of Sri Lanka
- Oswald Denison (1905–1990), New Zealand rower
- Oswald Durand (1840–1906), Haitian poet and politician
- Oswald Herbert Ernst (1842–1926), American engineer, military educator, and career officer
- Oswald Feliz (born 1990), American politician and attorney
- Oswald Freisler (1895–1939), German lawyer
- Oswald Garrison Villard (1872–1949), American journalist
- Oswald Gomis (1932–2023), 10th Archbishop of Colombo
- Oswald Gracias (born 1944), Goan Catholic clergyman, Archbishop of Bombay
- Oswald Grübel (born 1943), German banker
- Oswald Hafenrichter (1899–1973), Austrian-British film editor
- Oswald Haselrieder (born 1971), Italian luger
- Oswald Heer (1809–1883), Swiss geologist and naturalist
- Oswald Hickson (1877–1944), English lawyer
- Oswald Hoffmann (1913–2005), American clergyman and broadcaster
- Oswald Homeky, Beninese politician
- Oswald Inglin (born 1953), Swiss politician and historian
- Oswald Jacoby (1902–1984), American bridge player
- Oswald H. Johnson (1912–1993), American politician
- Oswald Kabasta (1896–1946), Austrian conductor
- Oswald Kaduk (1906–1997), German Rapportführer at the Auschwitz concentration camp
- Oswald Karch (1917–2009), German Formula One driver
- Oswald Leroy (1936–2022), Belgian mathematician
- Oswald Lewis (disambiguation), multiple people
- Oswald Lohse (1845–1915), German astronomer
- Oswald Lorenz (1806–1889), German musicologist and composer
- Ossie Mazengarb (1890–1963), New Zealand magistrate with a full name of Oswald Chettle Mazengarb
- Oswald Menghin (1888–1973), Austrian prehistorian
- Oswald Milne (1881–1968), British architect
- Oswald Mosley (1896–1980), English fascist and politician, founder of the British Union of Fascists
- Sir Oswald Mosley (disambiguation), several people
- Oswald Mbuyiseni Mtshali (born 1940), South African poet
- Oswald Myconius (1488–1552), Swiss theologian and follower of Huldrych Zwingli
- Oswald Norris (1883–1973), English cricketer and soldier
- Oswald Ottendorfer (1826–1900), American journalist
- Oswald Peraza (born 2000), Venezuelan baseball player
- Oswald Pilloud (1873–1946), Swiss artist
- Oswald Pirow (1890–1959), South African far-right politician
- Oswald Poche (1908–1962), German chief of the Gestapo
- Oswald Pohl (1892–1951), German Nazi SS officer executed for war crimes
- Oswald Rayner (1888–1961), British MI6 field agent
- Oswald Rishbeth (1886–1946), Australian geographer
- Oswald Hope Robertson (1886–1966), American physician
- Oswald Rufeisen (1922–1998), Polish-Jewish Carmelite friar and partisan during World War II
- Oswald Schmiedeberg (1838–1921), Baltic German pharmacologist
- Oswald Short (1883–1969), English aeronautical engineer
- Oswald Sickert (1828–1885), Danish artist
- Oswald Sigg (born 1944), Swiss journalist
- Oswald Silberrad (1878–1960), British chemist
- Oswald Spengler (1880–1936), German historian and philosopher
- Oswald Stoll (1866–1942), Australian-British theater manager
- Oswald Szemerényi (1913–1996), Hungarian linguist
- Oswald Teichmüller (1913–1943), German mathematician
- Oswald Tesimond (1563–1636), English Jesuit part of the Gunpowder Plot
- Oswald Tippo (1911–1999), American botanist and educator
- Oswald Tschirtner (1920–2007), Austrian artist
- Oswald Mathias Ungers (1926–2007), German architect
- Oswald Veblen (1880–1960), American mathematician
- Oswald von Wolkenstein (1376/7–1445), a composer
- Oswald Wardell-Yerburgh (1858–1913), Church of England clergyman
- Oswald Werner (1928–2023), Slovak-American linguist
- Oswald West (1873–1960), American politician, 14th Governor of Oregon
- Oswald Wirth (1860–1943), Swiss occultist
- Oswald Wynd (1913–1998), Scottish writer
- Oswald Yorke (1866–1943), British actor
- Oswald Zimmermann (1859–1910), German antisemitic politician and journalist

== Fictional characters ==
- Oswald Alving, a character in Ibsen's play Ghosts
- Oswald the Lucky Rabbit, an animated cartoon character created in 1927 by Walt Disney
- Penguin (Oswald Chesterfield Cobblepot), fictional character appearing in American comic books published by DC Comics
- Oswald Lee Harvey, a character appearing on the American television show, The Drew Carey Show
- Oswald Mosley, a character from British period crime drama television series, Peaky Blinders
- Oswald, a blue octopus who is the titular character of the American-British animated children's television series, Oswald.
- Oswald Danes, a fictional character in the BBC television program, Torchwood
- Oswald McGillicutty, a fictional character from the Saw franchise

== See also ==
- Oswaldo (Spanish Oswalds)
- Oswald (surname)
- Oswald (disambiguation)
- Ozzy (disambiguation)
- Ozzy (given name)
- Ozzie
