= Oswald (surname) =

Oswald is a surname of Scottish, northern English, German and Swiss-German provenance.

== Origin of name ==
The surname derives from the Anglo-Saxon personal name Oswald, in particular, King Oswald of Bernicia and later Northumbria. Bernicia consisted of what is now the Lothian and Borders areas of southern Scotland and the English counties of Northumberland and County Durham, while Northumbria was formed by uniting this kingdom with Deira (Yorkshire) to the south.

As described by Bede, after his death in 642, Oswald soon came to be regarded as a saint. The name was introduced to Germany as a result of his fame being spread by Celtic missionaries to southern Germany.

== Etymology ==
The word Oswald is composed of two Anglo-Saxon elements, Ōs meaning 'god' and weald meaning 'rule' or ‘power’.

== Distribution ==
Oswald surname concentration, 1998 Shows the upper sextile in Great Britain, by postcode area

The surname is most prevalent, as regards frequency, in Scotland and the southern part of the German speaking area (Germany, Luxembourg, Switzerland and Austria). Also in some but not all former German colonial territories (Tanzania, Namibia and Rwanda).The United States is the country with most occurrences of the name.

=== Scotland and northern England ===
Oswald is most frequent in the KY postcode area (i.e. Fife and Kinross-shire) and the PH postcode area (namely in and around Perthshire) in Scotland. Also in the DH postcode area which covers central parts of County Durham in northern England. The town with the highest frequency is Burntisland in Fife. In 1881 the distribution was more concentrated and the area with the highest frequency was Fife and Kinross-shire (KY). In that year Fife and Kinross-shire contained 31% of all Oswalds in Scotland.

=== South Germany ===
The German states (Länder) where Oswald is most prevalent are Bavaria and then Baden-Württemberg.

It is also common in some adjacent areas, such as parts of Rhineland-Palatinate. The districts with the highest frequency are Munich and Regen in Bavaria and Worms in Rhineland-Palatinate.

=== Austria and Switzerland ===
In Austria the name frequently occurs in all areas, except west Tyrol and East Tyrol, north Burgenland and some areas west of Vienna. It is also common in neighbouring eastern Switzerland in parts of Glarus, Thurgau, and Graubünden.

== History ==
=== Occurrence of the surname ===
Until the recording of surnames with the census in Scotland from 1841 onwards, the occurrence of surnames can be ascertained from the register of births and baptisms of each parish. This registration became prevalent throughout Scotland from about 1690 when the present Church of Scotland was re-established.

As shown by the parish registers, the Oswald name in Scotland in the period 1690-1800 was concentrated in Fife (45% of Oswalds), with lesser concentrations in neighbouring counties of Kinross, Perth and Stirling. The County of Edinburgh (i.e. Midlothian) also had a high occurrence.

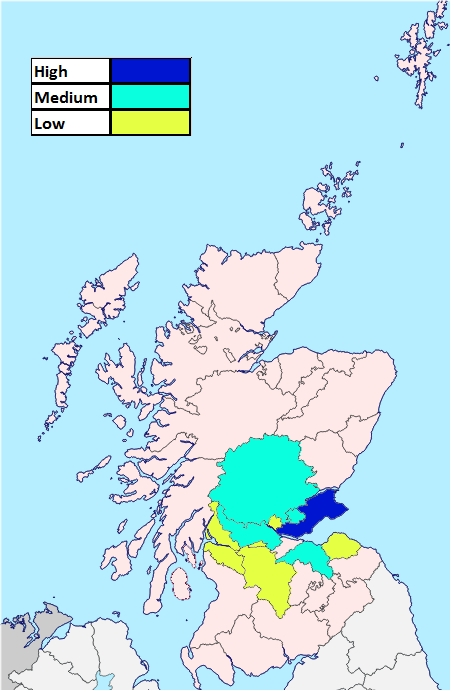
Map of Oswald surname 1690-1800 From the parish registers of births/baptisms, county totals High:Over 10 per 10,000. Medium: Over 3 per 10,000

Oswald in Scotland 1690-1800, by County
County	Oswald Births	All Births	Per 10,000
Fife	340	256601	13.3
Stirling	71	126880	5.6
Kinross	10	18954	5.3
Perth	121	295456	4.1
Edinburgh	108	294348	3.7
Dumbarton	13	45584	2.9
Clackmannan	8	28176	2.8
Haddington	20	90817	2.2
Renfrew	19	109710	1.7
Lanark	34	265162	1.3
Argyll	5	76300	0.7
Linlithgow	4	62188	0.6
Ayr	8	162775	0.5
Caithness	2	41224	0.5
Forfar	1	194724	0.1
Births with Oswald surname 1690-1800, with rate of occurrence per 10,000 births. Counties with zero occurrences not included

=== Prominent families ===
From the end of the 17th century until 1938, a family of the name Oswald owned the estate of Dunnikier, near Kirkcaldy, Fife. Originally their seat was Dunnikier in the parish of Dysart, Fife, at Pathhead. This property anciently belonged to the family of Lundin of Balgonie. However, in 1791-93, James Townsend Oswald arranged for a new mansion to be built in the northern part of the parish of Kirkcaldy, by Alexander Laing. The estate was then also named Dunnikier. The family lived there until the last of the line, Colonel St Clair Oswald, C.R., died at Dunnikier House on 14th Dec 1938. His wife died at Wellington, Somerset, in 1973 and was interred at Dunnikier.

Another family descends from James Oswald of Kirkwall, who was born about 1590, and died about 1660. He had a son, James who was a Bailie of Wick, Caithness. His descendants settled at Scotstoun, Renfrewshire (now in Glasgow) and, in 1759, at the estate of Auchincruive in Ayrshire. Richard Oswald built the present Auchincruive House (St Quivox parish) and the estate remained in the possession of the Oswald family until 1925.

Scotstoun, which was a mansion and estate on the north bank of the Clyde in the parish and county of Renfrew (but now subsumed in Glasgow), was purchased in 1748 by the brothers Richard and Alexander Oswald from the creditors of John Walkinshaw. The brothers were merchants in Glasgow and grandsons of James Oswald, Bailie of Wick. Being unmarried, they then left the estate to George Oswald, also a merchant in Glasgow, who was the eldest son of their cousin Rev. James Oswald, minister of Methven, Perthshire. George succeeded to the estate in 1766. The estate of Scotstoun remained in the possession of the Oswald family into the 19th century.

South of Balgray, in the parish of Mearns, Renfrewshire, lay the Barony of Fingalton, which was originally of great extent and one of the oldest possessions of the Hamilton family of Preston. Margaret, daughter of Sir Thomas Hamilton of Preston (died 1672), married Sir James Oswald and in 1681 Sir William Hamilton secretly sold Fingalton and other estates to Sir James Oswald, his brother-in-law. Sir William Hamilton then went to Holland to join the party of William of Orange. By 19th century Fingalton had passed out of the possession of the Oswalds and Fingalton itself only existed as the name of its mill.

Prior to the Reformation, Denny, Stirlingshire, had a vicar by the name of Oswald. Being then within the parish of Falkirk, he was subordinate to the rector of Falkirk. The vicar managed to secure 28 acres of glebe land next to Denny, subsequently known as the lands of Dryburgh, to his family, which was confirmed by King James VI. This property remained in possession of the Oswald family until the death of James Oswald of Dryburgh in about 1815.

In 1666, Charles II granted by charter (confirmed in 1669 by Parliament) to Andrew Oswald of Dalderse, advocate, and his heirs the town and lands of Dalderse, Stirlingshire, with houses, fishing rights, etc. Furthermore, that these properties were to be incorporated in a whole free barony, to be called for evermore the barony of Dalderse. Dalderse lies within the parish of Falkirk.

Oswald family crest (Dunnikier)

Crest and Motto of Oswald Families
Seat/Place	Crest	Motto
Dunnikier, Fife	a star of six points, waved, argent	Monstrant astra viam
Dalderse, Stirlingshire	comet star	Monstrant astra viam
Fingalton, Renfrewshire	dexter hand issuing out of a cloud and pointing to a star of eight rays	Forti favet coelum
Scotstoun, Renfrewshire	ship under sail	Non mihi commodus unl
Auchincruive, Ayrshire	dexter hand issuing out of a cloud and pointing to a star of eight rays	Sequamur
Crest and Motto as recorded in 19th century

=== Oswalds in Fife ===
The first census of Scotland which included the recording of surnames at each address was that of 1841. The latest published with names (due to confidentiality policy) is 1911. The occurrence of the Oswald surname at these two census shows that the name was distributed in the south of Fife, especially around Largo Bay from Kirkcaldy to Largo (see map).

Map of Oswald surname in Fife
From the 1841 and 1911 census, by parish. Parishes with an occurrence shown in orange

Central Fife 1875
Showing main area for Oswald surname. The seat of the Oswald family was at Dunnikier, north of Kirkcaldy

== People with surname Oswald ==
- Alice Oswald (born 1966), British poet
- Andrew Oswald (born 1953), British economist
- Debra Oswald (born 1959), Australian writer
- Denis Oswald (born 1947), Swiss rower and sports official
- Eduard Oswald (born 1947), Bavarian and German politician
- Eleazer Oswald (1755–1795), American soldier and journalist
- Elisabeth Oswald, Austrian cryptographer
- Ferdinand Oswald (born 1990), German footballer
- Gerd Oswald (1919–1989), American film director
- Henrique Oswald (1852–1931), Brazilian composer
- Ian Oswald (1929–2012), British scientist
- James Oswald (disambiguation), several persons
- Jimmy Oswald (1868–1948), Scottish footballer
- John Oswald (disambiguation), several persons
- Julian Oswald (1933–2011), British naval officer
- Kai Oswald (born 1977), German footballer
- Karlheinz Oswald (born 1958), German sculptor
- Karsten Oswald (born 1975), German footballer
- Kirsten Oswald (born 1972), Scottish M.P.
- Lance W. Oswald (1937–2019), Australian footballer
- Lee Harvey Oswald (1939–1963), assassin of John F. Kennedy
- Maneno Oswald (born 1970), Tanzanian boxer
- Marguerite Oswald, mother of Lee Harvey Oswald
- Marina Oswald Porter, wife of Lee Harvey Oswald
- Pascal Oswald (born 1980), Swiss skeleton racer
- Peter Oswald (born 1965), British playwright
- Philipp Oswald (born 1986), Austrian tennis player
- Richard Oswald (1880–1963), Austrian film director
- Richard Oswald (merchant) (1705–1784), Scottish merchant
- Richard Alexander Oswald (1771–1841), Scottish politician
- Rob Oswald (born 1964), American drummer
- Stephen S. Oswald (born 1951), American astronaut
- Theresa Oswald, Canadian politician
- Thomas Oswald (1904–1990), Scottish and British politician
- Thomas Oswald (British Army officer) (1722–?), Scottish army officer
- Walter Oswald (born 1955), German footballer
- William D. Oswald (born 1936), American missionary

== Fictional characters ==
- Clara Oswald, companion of The Doctor

== See also ==
- Oswald (given name)
- Oswald (disambiguation)
