= Oswald =

Oswald may refer to:

== People ==
- Oswald (given name), including a list of people with the name
- Oswald (surname), including a list of people with the name
- Oswald (musician), a Haitian singer

== Places ==
- Oswald, New South Wales, Australia, a suburb of the City of Maitland local government area
- Oswald, Missouri, United States, a ghost town
- Oswald, West Virginia, United States, an unincorporated community

== Ships ==
- USS Oswald (DE-767), a World War II destroyer escort
- HMS Oswald, an Odin-class submarine built in 1928

== Other uses ==
- Oswald (TV series), an American-British children's animated television series, also the title character
- OsWALD, a 1988 Danish computer game
- Oswald State Correctional Facility, a fictional prison in the television series Oz

== See also ==
- Baron St Oswald, a title in the Peerage of the United Kingdom
- Saint Oswald (disambiguation)
- Oswaldo, a given name
- Oswalt, a given name and surname
- Ostwald (disambiguation)
