= Ossie =

Ossie is a nickname usually used in place of a given name such as Osama, Osman, Oswald, Oscar, Ossian, Osmond, Osbourne and Osvaldo. In Assyrian Neo-Aramaic, it is used as a diminutive for Joseph and Yousif. It may refer to:

== People ==
=== Given name ===
- Ossie Abeygunasekera (1950–1994), assassinated Sri Lankan politician
- Osvaldo Ardiles (born 1952), Argentinian football manager, pundit and former player
- Ossie Asmundson (1908–1964), Canadian National Hockey League player
- Ossie Bertram (1909–1983), Australian rules footballer
- Ossie Blanco, 1970s baseball player
- Ossie Bluege (1900–1985), American Major League Baseball player
- Ossie Byrne (1926–1983), Australian record producer best known for his work with the early Bee Gees
- Ossie Clark (1942–1996), British fashion designer
- Ossie Davis (1917–2005), African-American actor and activist
- Ossie Dawson (1919–2008), South African cricketer
- Ossie Fraser (1923–1982), Canadian politician
- Ossie Green (1906–1991), Australian rules footballer
- Ossie Lovelock (1911–1981), Australian sportsman
- Ossie Male (1893–1975), Welsh rugby union player
- Ossie Moore (born 1958), Australian golfer
- Oswald Morris (1915–2014), British cinematographer
- Ossie Nicholson (1906–1965), Australian cyclist
- Ossie Nortjé (born 1990), South African rugby union player
- Ossie Ocasio (born 1955), Puerto Rican retired boxer and former world cruiserweight champion
- Ossie Pickworth (1918–1969), Australian golfer
- Ossie Schectman (1919–2013), American basketball player who scored the first basket in National Basketball Association history
- Ossie Solem (1891–1970), American college football and basketball head coach
- Ossie Vitt (1890–1963), American Major League baseball player and manager
- Peter Osgood (1947–2006), English footballer nicknamed 'Ossie'

=== Surname ===
- Manuel Ossie (born 1968), Liberian boxer

== Fictional characters ==
- Ossie Ostrich, on the Australian TV programs Tarax Show, Hey Hey It's Saturday and The Ossie Ostrich Video Show
- Oswald the Lucky Rabbit, created by Ub Iwerks and Walt Disney for funny animal films in the 1920s and '30s

== See also ==
- Ozzie
- Ossi (disambiguation)
- Ossee Schreckengost, American baseball player
