= Ludmila Foxlee =

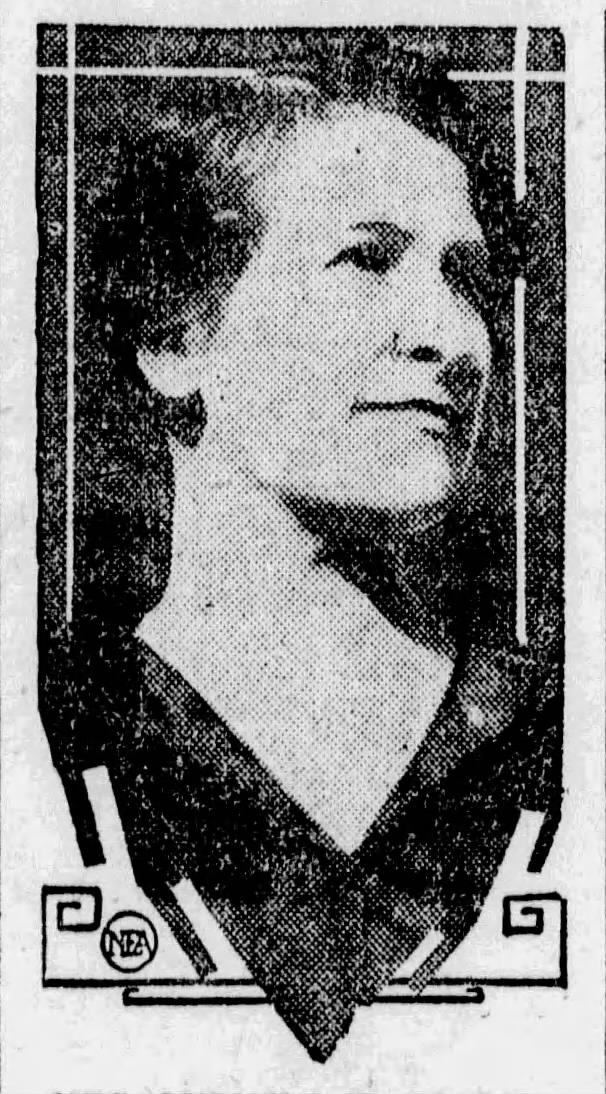
- Born: 13 August 1885; Vienna
- Died: 28 February 1971; Montvale
- Occupations: Social worker, singer

Ludmila Kuchar Foxlee (August 13, 1885 – February 28, 1971) was an American social worker at the Ellis Island immigration station. Employed by the YWCA after World War I, Foxlee spent time in Czechoslovakia to assist in rebuilding efforts before working at Ellis Island from 1920 to 1937. She became one of the most well-known immigrant aid workers and her meticulous notes are currently stored at the Ellis Island archives (National Park Service).

== Early life ==
Foxlee was born Ludmila Kuchařová in Bohemia in 1885, to a Czech father and an Austrian mother. She emigrated to the United States in 1894 with her family. For many years, Foxlee toured the United States and Canada as a singer and actress with the Annie Russel Theatrical Company.

During one of these tours, her husband, John, joined the company as a set designer and subsequently they were married. She worked as a singer for some of Thomas Edison's early experiments with the phonograph.

== Social work ==
After World War I, she traveled to Czechoslovakia to aid the YWCA in setting up camps and schools for orphaned girls. Tomáš Masaryk, president of Czechoslovakia, presented her with the Order of the White Lion for her tremendous interest and work on behalf of his people.

Foxlee helped thousands of detained immigrants at Ellis Island (1920–1937). She served as a translator, as she could speak in several languages in addition to her native Czech (she was fluent in German, she was able to understand Russian, Polish, Serbian and Croatian). Foxlee was interested in the folk dress and music of newcomers. She also assisted in the immigrants' cultural assimilation to U.S. society, at times giving women a "makeover" with Americanized clothing.

Foxlee carried on her interest in the Czechoslovak people by writing a syndicated family life column for many years in their language for two Chicago-based Czechoslovak newspapers.

== Family ==
Her sister was married to the sculptor Joseph (Joza) Krupka (1880–1917) in 1906. When her sister's husband died in 1917, she made a decision to give her sister's two children a chance to grow up removed from the city congestion and Foxlee, and her husband purchased a farm in Montvale, New Jersey, and to set up an antiques business.

On her death her YMCA and Ellis Island papers were given to the National Park Service.

She is buried in the Upper Saddle River Reformed Church Cemetery.
