= Ozzy (disambiguation) =

Ozzy Osbourne (1948–2025), was an English singer, songwriter, actor and reality television star.

Ozzy may also refer to:

- Ozzy (given name) or Ozzie, masculine name
- Ozzy (album), 1996 album by Canadian alternative/indie rock band hHead
- Ozzy (film), 2016 animated comedy film
- Ozzy the Bull, 2022 animatronic sculpture

== See also ==
- Ozzey, fictional character from Bo' Selecta!
