= Oswald Yorke =

American actor

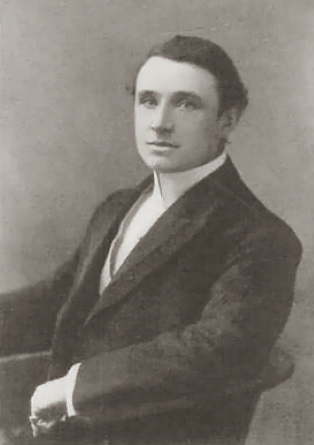
- Photograph of Oswald Yorke, published July 1901
- Born: Oswald Parkinson Harker; 24 November 1866; Poole, Dorset, England, United Kingdom
- Died: 25 January 1943 (aged 76); New York City, New York, United States
- Occupation: Actor
- Years active: 1880s–1939
- Spouse(s): Annie Russell; Ruth Guiterman

Oswald Yorke (né Oswald Parkinson Harker; 24 November 1866 – 25 January 1943) was a British character actor who had a near sixty-year career performing on both sides of the Atlantic.

== Early life ==
Oswald Parkinson Harker was born in Poole, Dorset, the youngest of six children raised by Joseph and Sarah (née Parkinson) Harker. Yorke's father, a solicitor, was born in York, Yorkshire, while his mother was a native of Richmond, Yorkshire. As a boy, Yorke attended Christ's Hospital Boys School, then located in Newgate.

== Career ==
Oswald Yorke first performed on stage in 1884 and later as a member of a company headed by British actor Sir Francis Robert Benson. Yorke's London's debut on 26 February 1889, at The Royal Strand Theatre, was followed early the next year by performances at London's Vaudeville Theatre in such plays as School for Scandal, "A Pair of Lunatics" and "Meadow Sweet". Oswald Yorke would remain a principal player with the Vaudeville Theatre throughout the balance of the 1890s.

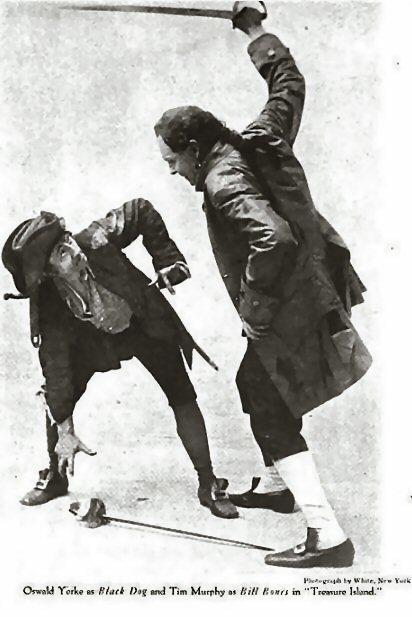
Oswald Yorke (left) as Black Dog with Bill Bones (Tim Murphy)

In 1896, Yorke toured America with Edward Smith Willard performing Henry Jones' play The Rogue Comedy. The following year, he returned with Willard's company with another of Jones' works, The Physician. In October 1900, he played an attaché with the French Embassy in The Eaglett, an adaptation of Edmond Rostand's L’Aiglon by Louis Napoleon Parker that starred Maude Adams. By the next year, Yorke became associated with the Empire Theatre on Broadway, first appearing as Lieutenant Sir Walter Mannering opposite John Drew and Guy Standing in Roger Marshall's The Second in Command. Yorke stayed with Empire Theatre, then under the management of Charles Frohman, for a number of seasons. He went on to play Bill Walker in George Bernard Shaw's Major Barbara with his actress wife Annie Russell at the Court Theatre in London and Broadway's New Theatre, and later as Malvolio at the Century Theatre in Shakespeare's The Twelfth Night.

Over the remainder of his life, the balance of Yorke's career was spent in New York. He played in at least thirty-one Broadway productions between 1900 and 1938. Yorke was Black Dog in a 1915 adaption of Robert Louis Stevenson's Treasure Island; Mr. Breen in the 1931 comedy "The Social Register" and Carter Hibbarb in George S. Kaufman's 1938 success, First Lady. Yorke's last Broadway performance, Justice Willis, came in the 1938 hit Oscar Wilde.

During World War I, Yorke was put in charge of the entertainment of soldiers attached to the American Expeditionary Force in France. He was a member of The Lambs in New York and The Savage Club in London.

== Personal life ==
Yorke was married three times.

Yorke first married – on 2 June 1897, in Manhattan at Grace Church – co-actress Agnes Palmer (full stage name Maude Agnes Palmer; née Maud Atkins Palmer; 1872–1962), who grew-up in the Beacon Hill neighborhood of Boston. Agnes was the daughter of Lowell Mason Palmer (1834–1871) and Sarah Evelyn Palmer (née Sarah Evelyn Rogers; 1852–1940). Sarah, Agnes' mother, during childhood, changed her maiden name to Sarah Evelyn Atkins, taking on the surname of her uncle and maternal aunt, who became her adoptive parents upon the early deaths of her parents, John Foster Rogers (1825–1852) and Mercy C. Eldridge (maiden; 1830–1862). Agnes Palmer had joined E. S. Willard around February 1897. Their marriage ended in divorce in Colorado – Agnes filed, claiming non-support. Agnes Palmer, on 5 September 1914, in Manhattan, married English actor Henry C. Vincent (né Henry Rojas; 1877–1962), with whom she remained married until his death in 1962, 4 months before hers.

Yorke married a second time – on 27 March 1904, in Manhattan – to Major Barbara co-star Annie Russell (1864–1936). Around that time, the two were performing in a return engagement of Charles Frohman's production Mice and Men, a comedy by Madeleine Lucette Ryley. The play opened Monday, 29 February 1904, at the Garrick Theatre in New York and closed 12 March 1904. They divorced in 1929.

Yorke married a third time – on 19 April 1938, in New Jersey – to Ruth Antoinette Guiterman (maiden; 1907–1980).

=== Death ===
Oswald Yorke died on 25 January 1943 at his apartment on West Forty-Fifth Street after a battle with lobar pneumonia. He was survived by his third wife, Ruth Guiterman, who had lost her uncle, writer Arthur Guiterman, just two weeks prior.
