= Oswalt =

Oswalt is a German surname or male given name, which is derived from the Old English given name Oswald. The name may refer to:

== Surname ==
- Corey Oswalt (born 1993), American baseball player
- John N. Oswalt (born 1940), American scholar
- Patton Oswalt (born 1969), American actor and comedian
- Roy Oswalt (born 1977), American baseball player

== Given name ==
- Oswalt Kolle (1928–2010), German sex educator
