= Édouard Pailleron =

French poet and dramatist (1834–1899)

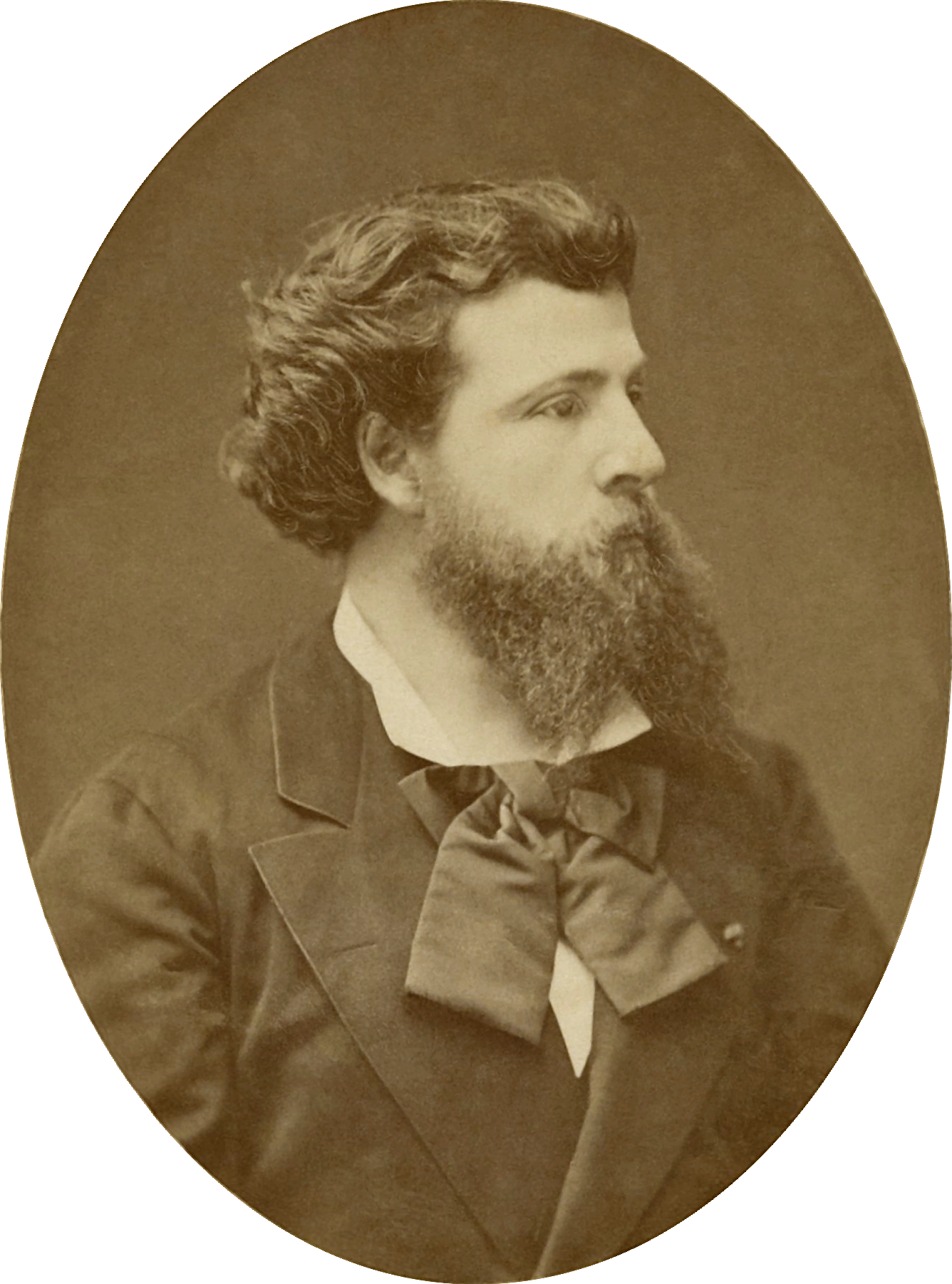
- Photograph of Pailleron by Étienne Carjat, c. 1875
- Born: Édouard Jules Henri Pailleron; 7 September 1834; Paris, France
- Died: 19 April 1899 (aged 64)
- Spouse: Marie Buloz (after 1862)
- Children: 3
- Awards: Légion d'honneur

Édouard Jules Henri Pailleron (7 September 1834 – 19 April 1899) was a French poet and dramatist best known for his play Le Monde où l'on s'ennuie.

== Early life ==
Édouard was born in Paris on 7 September 1834. From a Parisian cultured "bourgeoise" family (upper-middle class), he earned first a doctorate in law, then became in succession a lawyer, notary clerk, soldier (a dragoon for two years), but irresistibly attracted by writing, he achieved his first success in 1860 with his one-act play Le Parasite, represented at the Odéon-Théâtre in Paris.

== Career ==
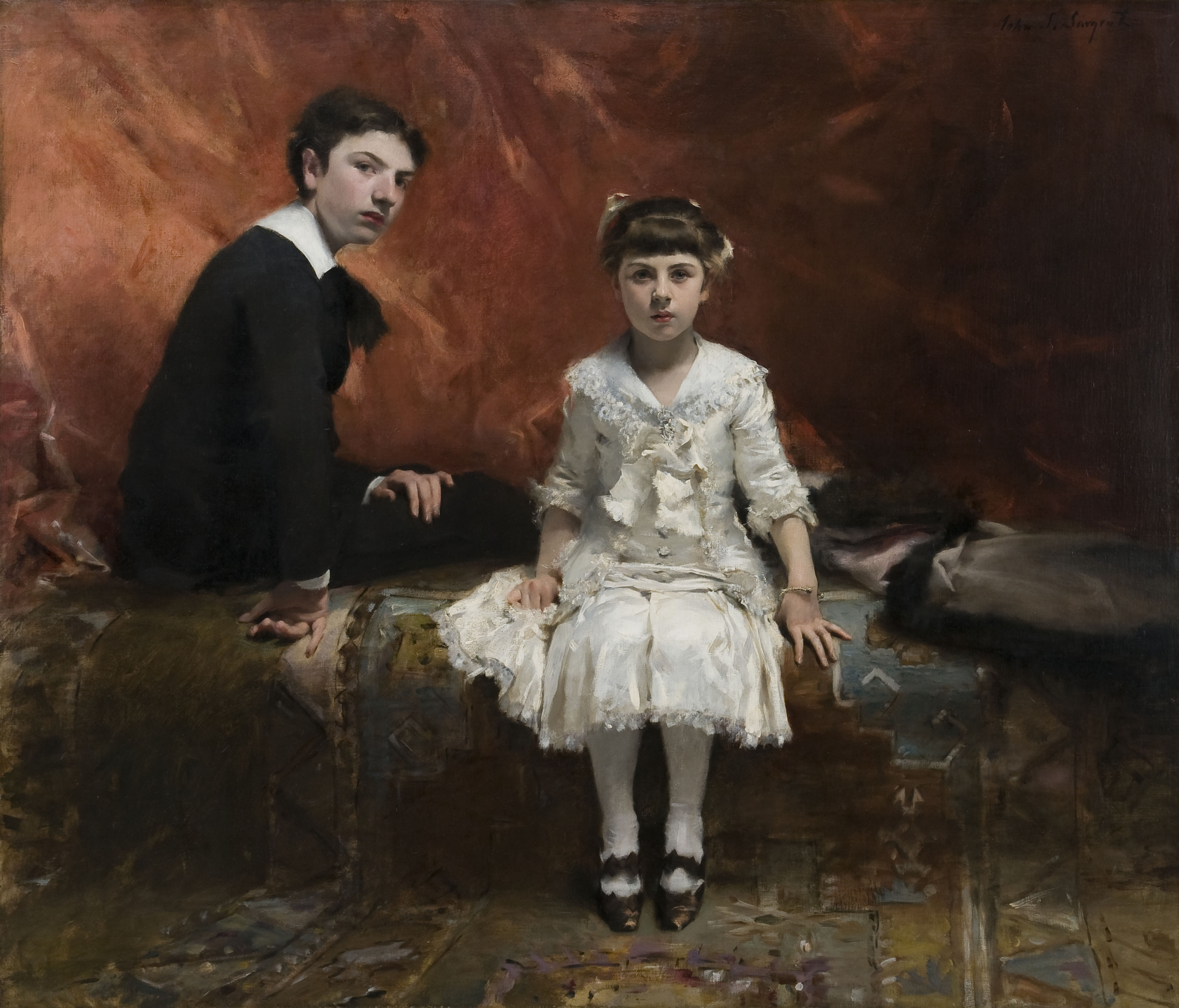
Portrait of Edouard and Marie-Loise Pailleron, John Singer Sargent, 1881

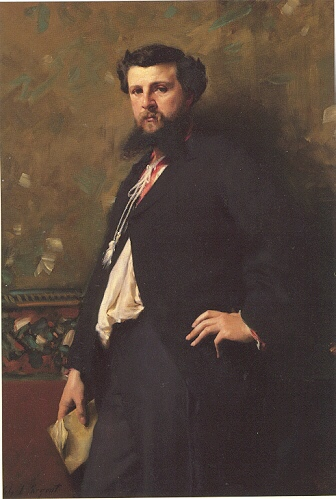
Édouard Pailleron by John Singer Sargent

He had a successful career with his comedies about social customs (comedies de moeurs). His first big hit was obtained at the Theatre du Gymnase, in 1868, with Le Monde où l'on s'amuse (the World where you're having fun), after which he became Director of the Comédie Française (where he was admitted in 1863 with his play Le Dernier quartier - the Last district).

Following his marriage, he became co-director of the Revue des Deux Mondes, a monument of the Romantic literature era founded by his father-in-law.

His career culminated in 1881 with Le Monde où l'on s'ennuie (the World where you are bored), one of the most strikingly successful pieces of the period with a prodigiously long run (over 1000 performances at La Comedie Française in Paris, and great success in St Petersburg, London, etc.) The play, a satirical comedy in three acts, ridiculed contemporary upper class society and was filled with transparent allusions to well-known people. The play was later adapted into English by Clinton Stuart under the title Our Society and presented at Madison Square Theatre in 1886. In America, the role of Suzanne, which was originated by French actress Suzette Reichenberg, was played by Annie Russell.

His triumphal success earned him his election to the famous Académie française in 1882 (seat n°12) and he was awarded the Légion d'honneur. Neither of his two last works (La Souris in 1887, and Cabotins in 1894) achieved so great a success.

After his death, his plays continued to be produced and staged for many years.

== Personal life ==
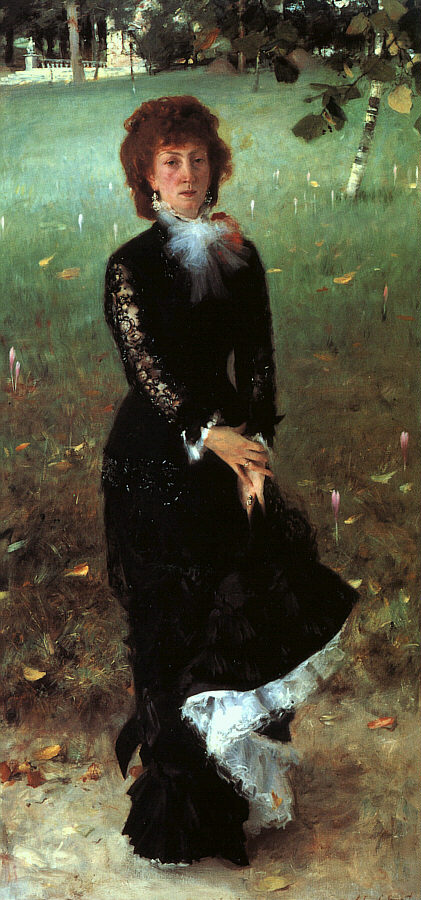
Madame Edouard Pailleron, John Singer Sargent, 1879

In 1862, he married Marie Buloz, the daughter of François Buloz, founder and director of the world-wide famous Revue des Deux Mondes. From his marriage with Marie, Edouard had three children:

- Édouard Pailleron Jr., who married Marguerite Forest, a daughter of his friend, the French Senator Charles Forest.
- Henri Pailleron, who died at only six years old.
- Marie-Louise Pailleron (1870–1951), who became an erudite historian of the "Revue des deux mondes" and of the major names in French literature of the 19th century. She married, and divorced, French lawyer Jacques Bourget.

Pailleron died on 19 April 1899.

=== Friendship with John Singer Sargent ===
Pailleron was a close friend of the American artist John Singer Sargent, who studied painting at the Parisian École des Beaux-Arts, introducing him to the Parisian high-life society which was very important for the beginning of his successful career. Sargent painted several portraits of Edouard and his family, which are all currently in museums, mainly American ones. Sargent painted a portrait of Edouard in 1879 (now in the Musée Chateau de Versailles, France), also his wife Marie in 1880 (now in the Corcoran Gallery of Art in Washington, D.C.), and also of his children, Edouard Jr. and Marie-Louise in 1881 (now in the Des Moines Art Center). These paintings were among the first to make John Singer Sargent famous.

== Legacy ==
A statue bust of Edouard Pailleron, sculpted in 1906 by Russian-born artist Leopold Bernard Bernstamm, is located in the Parc Monceau in Paris.

Finally, his vacation property above Chambéry (Savoie), named "La Souris", built in the last years of the 19th century, is still surviving and virtually unchanged as the original park with trees more than 100 years old, even if the whole is now an allotment. In contrast, in the same park, the cottage of his friend Charles Forest, Senator of Savoie, whose daughter Marguerite married his son Edouard, no longer exists.

=== Collège Édouard-Pailleron ===
In France, his name became famous again in the 1970s because it was given to a school in Paris near Buttes Chaumont Park in northeastern Paris. The school was destroyed by a fire on 6 February 1973, killing 21 children.
