= Ostwald =

Ostwald may refer to:

- Friedrich Wilhelm Ostwald, the physico-chemist (awarded the Nobel Prize in Chemistry, 1909)
1. Ostwald's rule of polymorphism: in general, the least stable polymorph crystallizes first
2. The Ostwald Process, a synthesis method for making nitric acid from ammonia
3. Ostwald ripening, a crystallization effect
4. Ostwald color system
5. Ostwald's law of dilution
- Wolfgang Ostwald, chemist and biologist, son of Friedrich Wilhelm Ostwald. He studied colloids
- Martin Ostwald, a German-American classical scholar
- Ostwald (crater), a crater on the far side of the Moon
- Ostwald, Bas-Rhin, a commune in the Bas-Rhin département in France

== See also ==
- Oswald (disambiguation)
- Ozwald Boateng
