= Ossi =

Ossi may refer to:

== Organizations ==
- Open Source Seed Initiative, dedicated to maintaining access to plant genetic resources
- Open Source Software Institute, promoter of open-source software solutions in the US Federal, state and municipal government agencies

== People ==
- Ossi (East Germans), a nickname given to former residents of the country East Germany (GDR)
- Ossian Ossi Blomqvist (1908–1955), Finnish speed skater
- Oskar "Ossi" Bonde (born 1979), the drummer of the rock band Johnossi
- Ossi Kauppi (1929–2000), Finnish ice hockey player
- Ossi Oikarinen (born 1970), Finnish engineer who works in Formula One
- Ossi Oswalda (1899–1948), German silent film actress
- Ossi Reichert (1925–2006), German Alpine skier
- Ossi Runne (1927–2020), Finnish conductor and composer
- Ossi Sandvik (born 1953), Finnish politician

== Other uses ==
- Order of the Star of Italian Solidarity
- Ossi, Sardinia, a city in the province of Sassari, Sardinia

== See also ==
- Ossie, a given name
- Ozzie, a given name
