= Elisabeth Oswald =

Austrian cryptographer

- Born: Wolfsberg, Carinthia
- Education: Graz University of Technology
- Scientific career
- Fields: Cryptography
- Thesis: On Side-Channel Attacks and the Application of Algorithmic Countermeasures (2003)
- Doctoral advisor: Reinhard Posch

Maria Elisabeth Oswald is an Austrian cryptographer known for her work on side-channel attacks including power analysis and on implementations of cryptosystems that are resistant to these attacks. She is a professor at the University of Klagenfurt and at the University of Birmingham.

== Education and career ==
Oswald is originally from Wolfsberg, Carinthia. She studied mathematics and information processing at the Graz University of Technology, completing her Ph.D. there in 2003 with the dissertation On Side-Channel Attacks and the Application of Algorithmic Countermeasures supervised by Reinhard Posch.

She started working at the University of Bristol in 2006 as a lecturer, and later became Professor in Applied Cryptography there. She moved to Klagenfurt in 2019, describing herself as a "Brexit refugee". She continues to be affiliated with the University of Bristol as an Honorary Professor. Since 2023 she has taken up a professorial position at the University of Birmingham.

== Book ==
With Stefan Mangard and Thomas Popp, Oswald is a coauthor of the book Power Analysis Attacks: Revealing the Secrets of Smartcards (Springer, 2007).
