= Oswald Lewis (disambiguation) =

Oswald Lewis (1887–1966) was a British businessman, barrister and politician.

Oswald Lewis may also refer to:

- Oswald Lewis (cricketer) (1833–1895), Australian cricketer
- Oswald Lewis (bishop) (born 1944), Indian Roman Catholic bishop
