= Oswald Inglin =

Swiss politician

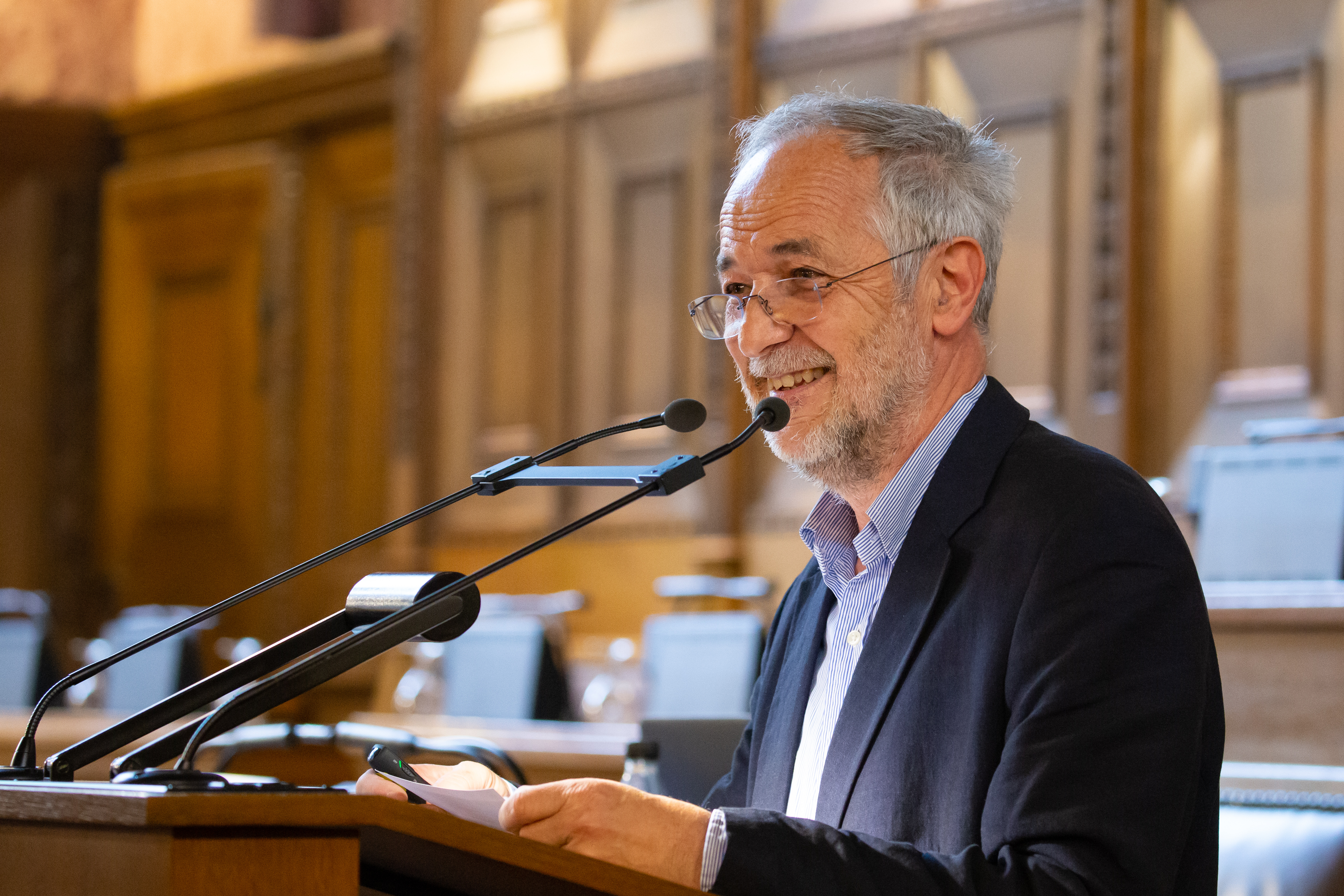

Oswald "Osi" Inglin (born 28 June 1953) is a Swiss politician (The Centre) and historian.

== Personal life ==
Inglin studied history, English and German at the University of Basel, in the US and Ireland, and took his master's degree in History and English in 1980. In 1981 he qualified as a high school teacher at the former Teacher Training College of the Canton of Basel-Stadt (today School of Education at the University of Applied Sciences Northwestern Switzerland).

In 1989 he obtained a doctorate in history with a thesis on the economic warfare between Great Britain and Switzerland in the Second World War. From 1980 until his retirement in 2016 he taught English and History at the Leonhard Grammar School in Basel. There, from 1988 onwards, he also served as a vice principal.

As a hobby, he gives guided tours through the quarters of Basel, the Basel Town Hall and the Basel Minster. On both, the Town Hall and the Minster, he has published guide books. The latter has been translated into English and has been published under the title Basel Cathedral – A Guide to the Stories behind the Stones.

== Political career ==
He was a Member of Parliament of the Canton of Basel-Stadt from 2005 to 2021, and as such he presided over the Committee on Education and Culture (German: Bildungs- und Kulturkommission) from 2013 to 2021.
