= Oswaldo =

Oswaldo (Spanish for "Oswald") is a Spanish masculine given name.

It may refer to:

- Oswaldo Buzzoni (1924–1988), Brazilian footballer
- Oswaldo Cabrera (born 1999), Venezuelan baseball player
- Oswaldo Castillo, Nicaraguan-American gardener/construction worker-turned-actor
- Oswaldo Cruz (1872–1917), Brazilian physician, bacteriologist, epidemiologist and public health officer
- Oswaldo Cruz Filho, Brazilian chess master
- Oswaldo de la Cruz, Peruvian politician and a Congressman
- Oswaldo de Oliveira (born 1950), Brazilian football manager
- Oswaldo de Rivero (born 1936), Peruvian career diplomat
- Rubén Oswaldo Díaz (1946–2018), former Argentine footballer
- Carlos Fernández (footballer, born 1984) (born 1984), Peruvian footballer
- Oswaldo Frota-Pessoa (1917–2010), Brazilian physician, biologist and geneticist
- Oswaldo Goeldi (1895–1961), Brazilian artist and engraver
- Oswaldo Guayasamín (1919–1999), Quechua Indian and Ecuadorian painter and sculptor
- Oswaldo Handro (1908–1986), Brazilian botanist, specialist in pteridophytes and spermatophytes
- Oswaldo Henríquez (born 1989), Colombian football defender
- Oswaldo Ibarra (born 1969), Ecuadorian football player and goalkeeper
- Oswaldo López Arellano (1921–2010), President of Honduras, 1963–1971, 1972–1975
- Oswaldo Louzada (1912–2008), Brazilian actor
- Oswaldo Luizar (born 1962), Peruvian politician
- Oswaldo Mairena (born 1975), baseball player
- Oswaldo Minda (born 1983), Ecuadorian footballer
- Oswaldo Moncayo (1923–1984), Ecuadorian painter
- Oswaldo Montenegro (born 1956), Brazilian musician
- Oswaldo Navarro (born 1984), Venezuelan baseball player
- Oswaldo Payá (1952–2012), political activist and dissident in Cuba
- Oswaldo Peraza (born 1962), baseball player
- Oswaldo Ramírez (born 1947), former Peruvian football striker
- Oswaldo Sánchez (born 1973), Mexican international goalkeeper
- Oswaldo Viteri (born 1931), neo-figurative artist
- Oswaldo Zambrana (born 1981), Bolivian chess master
- Oswaldo (footballer), full name Oswaldo Alfredo de Lima Gonçalves (born 1992), Brazilian footballer

== See also ==
- Osvaldo
- Oswaldo Cruz Foundation, scientific institution for research and development in biomedical sciences in Rio de Janeiro, Brazil
- Oswaldo Cruz, Rio de Janeiro, neighborhood of the North Zone of Rio de Janeiro
- Rodovia Oswaldo Cruz, state highway in the state of São Paulo in Brazil
- Oswaldo (TV series)
