= James Oswald =

James Oswald may refer to:

- James Oswald (elder) (1650–1716), of Dunniker, Scottish politician, MP for Dysart Burgh, 1710–15
- James Oswald (composer) (1710–1769), Scottish composer, arranger, cellist, and music publisher
- James Oswald (younger) (1715–1769), of Dunnikier, Scottish Whig politician and Privy Counsellor
- James Townsend Oswald (1748–1814), of Dunnikier, Scottish politician
- James Oswald (merchant) (1779-1853), of Shieldhall, Scottish merchant and MP for Glasgow
- James Francis Oswald (1838–1908), British politician, Member of Parliament for Oldham
- Jimmy Oswald (1868–1948), Scottish footballer
- James Oswald (writer), Scottish writer
- James Oswald (moderator) (1703–1793), Moderator of the General Assembly of the Church of Scotland in 1765
