= Osvald (given name) =

Male given name

- Gender: Male
- Name day: 11 January

Osvald is a male given name.

People named Osvald include:

- Kristian Osvald Viderø (1906–1991), Faroese clergyman, poet and Bible translator
- Osvald Chlubna (1893–1971), Czech composer
- Osvald Helmuth (1894–1966), Danish stage and film actor
- Osvald Käpp (1905–1995), Estonian wrestler who won a gold medal at the 1928 Summer Olympics
- Osvald Moberg (1888–1933), Swedish gymnast who competed in the 1908 Summer Olympics
- Osvald Polívka (1859–1931), Austrian-born Czech architect associated with the Secession / Art Nouveau period in Prague
- Osvald Sirén (1879–1966), Finnish-born Swedish art historian, whose interests included 18th century Sweden, Renaissance Italy and China
