= Ozzie =

Ozzie or Ozzy is a masculine given name, sometimes a short form (hypocorism) of Oswald, Oscar, Osborne, Osman and Ozymandias and other names, surname and nickname which may refer to:

== Animals ==
- Ozzie (gorilla) (c. 1961–2022)

== People ==
- Chris Osgood (born 1972), Canadian National Hockey League goaltender for the Detroit Red Wings
- Ray Ozzie (born 1955), American former Chief Software Architect at Microsoft
- Ozzie Albies (born 1997), Major League Baseball player
- Ozzie Cadena (1924–2008), American record producer
- Ozzie Canseco (born 1964), Cuban-born former baseball player, brother of José Canseco
- Osborne Colson (1916–2006), Canadian figure skater and coach
- Osborne Cowles (1899–1997), American college basketball and football player and coach
- Ozzie Guillén (born 1964), Venezuelan former Major League Baseball player and manager
- Ozzy Lusth (born 1981), Survivor reality TV show contestant
- Ozzie Myers (born 1943), American politician convicted for his part in the Abscam scandal
- Ozzie Nelson (1901–1975), American band leader, actor, director, and producer, best known for playing the father in the sitcom The Adventures of Ozzie and Harriet.
- Ozzie Newsome, American former National Football League player and current general manager of the Baltimore Ravens, member of the Hall of Fame
- Ozzie Osborn (born 1946), American former Major League Baseball pitcher in 1975
- Ozzy Osbourne (1948–2025), English lead singer for heavy metal band Black Sabbath, songwriter and star of the reality TV show The Osbournes
- Ozzie Silna (1932–2016), American businessman and basketball franchise co-owner
- Ozzie Simmons (1914–2001), African-American college football player
- Ozzie Smith (born 1954), American retired Major League Baseball player and member of the Hall of Fame
- Ozzie Sweet (1918–2013), American sports photographer born Oscar Cowan Corbo
- Ozzie Timmons (born 1970), American former Major League Baseball player
- Ozzy Trapilo, American football player
- Ozzie Virgil Sr. (1932–2024), former Major League Baseball utility player from the Dominican Republic
- Ozzie Virgil Jr. (born 1956), former Major League Baseball All-Star catcher from Puerto Rico
- Ozzy Wiesblatt (born 2002), Canadian National Hockey League right winger
- Ozzy Zoltak (born 1983), Israeli musical artist

== Fictional characters ==
- Ozzie Altobello, main villain in the film The Godfather Part III, played by Eli Wallach
- Ozzy Delvecchio, character played by John Leguizamo in Bloodline (TV series)
- Ozzie Graham, reporter who joins the StarCrossed group in the TV series People of Earth
- Ozzie Fernandez Isaacs, creator of the wormholes technology and the gaïa field in the Commonwealth universe of Peter F Hamilton
- Ozzie Mandrill, villain in computer adventure game Escape from Monkey Island
- Ozzie Paxton, a computer-engineering prodigy, played by Vincent Kartheiser in Masterminds (1997 film)
- Ozzie Takada, a character in That 90's Show
- Ozzie, Slash, and Flea, villains who serve Magus in the role-playing game Chrono Trigger
- "My Ozzie," bachelor owner of Earl, the Jack Russell terrier in Mutts, the comic strip
- Ozzie, a resistance fighter for Earth played by Travis MacDonald, on the second-season episode of the Andromeda TV series named Bunker Hill
- Ozzy the Eagle, mascot for Ozarks Technical Community College.

== See also ==
- Aussie, a slang term for Australian, both the adjective and the noun, and less commonly, Australia
- Ossi (disambiguation)
- Ossie, a given name
