= Century Theatre (Central Park West) =

Theater in Manhattan, New York (1909–30)

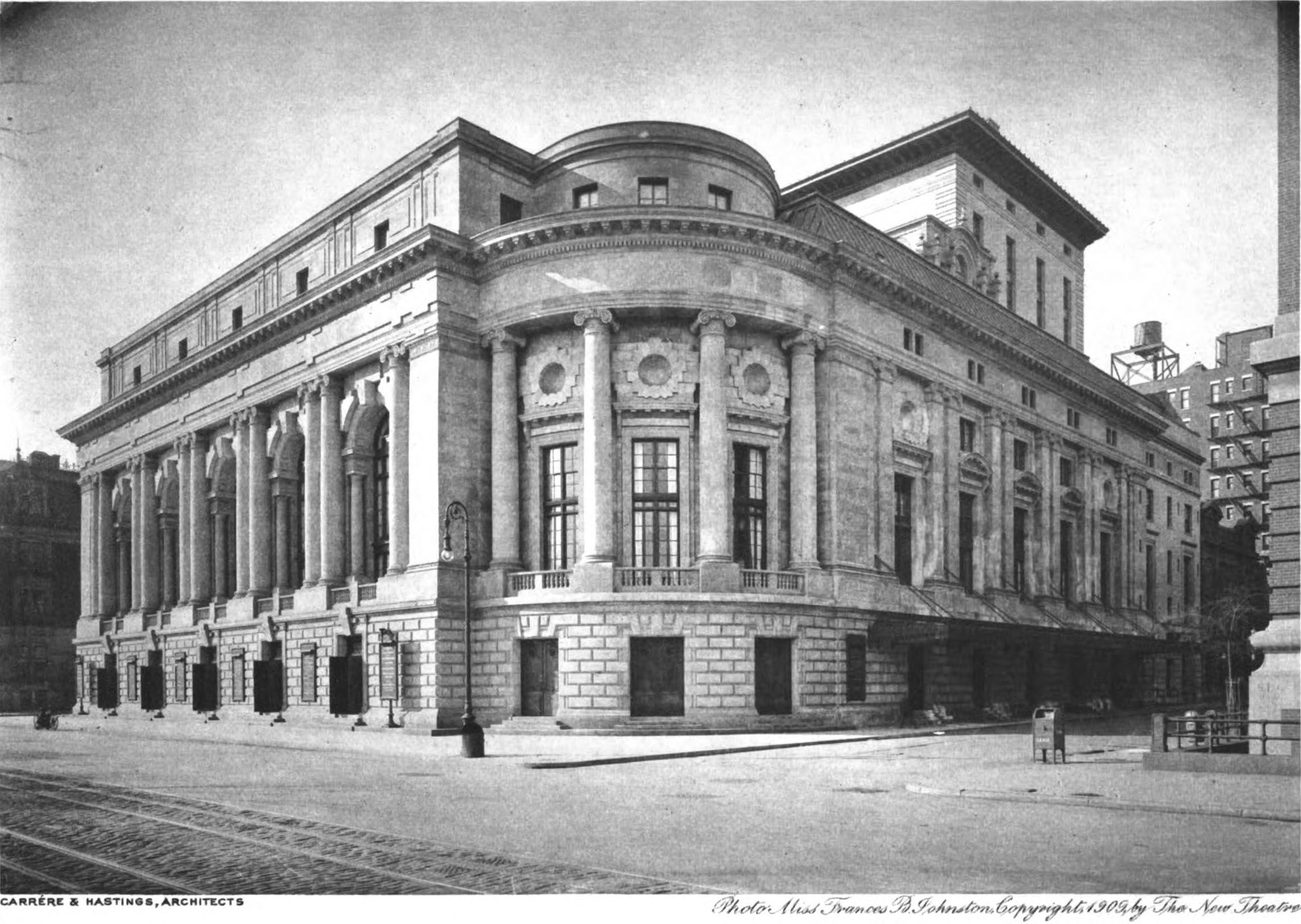
- The New Theatre as seen in 1909
- Alternative names: New Theatre; Century Opera House

General information
- Type: Theatre, opera house
- Architectural style: Beaux-Arts
- Location: Central Park West at 62nd Street, New York City (Upper West Side, Manhattan), New York, United States
- Coordinates: 40.7701°N 73.9806°W
- Construction started: 1906
- Inaugurated: 1909
- Demolished: 1930
- Cost: $1,700,000 (budget)

Technical details
- Structural system: Exterior supporting masonry, internal steel columns and girders

Design and construction
- Architect: Carrère and Hastings

References
- Barber, Donn, editor (November 1909). The New York Architect 3 (11). New York: Harwell-Evans.

The Century Theatre, originally the New Theatre, was a theatre at 62nd Street and Central Park West on the Upper West Side of Manhattan in New York City. Opened on November 6, 1909, it was noted for its fine architecture but due to poor acoustics and an inconvenient location it was financially unsuccessful. It was briefly renamed the Century Opera House in 1913, until reverting back to the Century Theatre in 1915. The theatre was demolished in 1930 and replaced by The Century apartment building.

== History ==
=== New Theatre ===
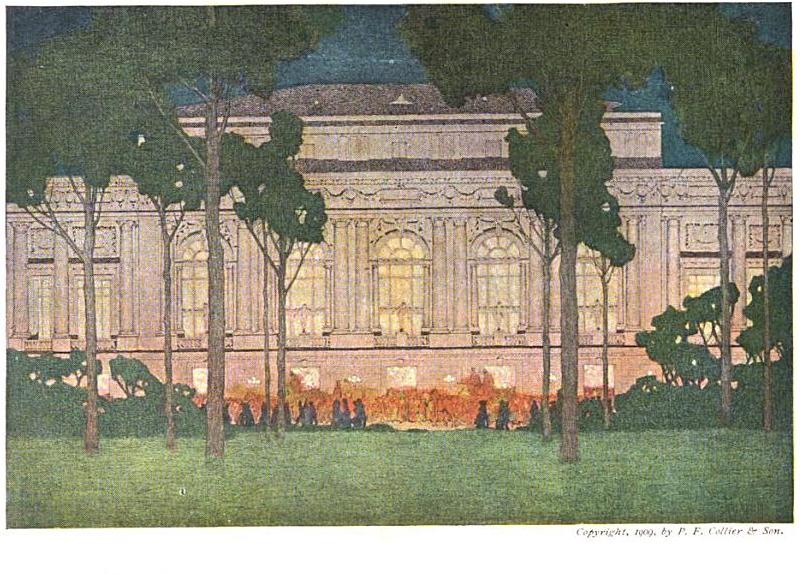
New Theatre, 1909

The New Theatre was once called "New York's most spectacularly unsuccessful theater" in the WPA Guide to New York City. Envisioned in 1906 by Heinrich Conried, a director of the Metropolitan Opera House, its construction was an attempt to establish a great theatre at New York free of commercialism, one that, broadly speaking, would resemble the Comédie Française of Paris. Thirty founders each subscribed $35,000 at the start, and a building designed to be the permanent home of a repertory company was constructed on Central Park West on the Upper West Side at a cost of three million dollars. Architecturally, it was one of the handsomest structures in the city, designed by the prominent Beaux-Arts architectural firm Carrère and Hastings.

With Winthrop Ames as the only director, the New Theatre Company occupied the building for only two seasons, 1909–10 and 1910–11. Capable of seating 2,300 persons, the New Theatre was opened on Saturday, November 6, 1909, with impressive ceremonies and apparently under the most favoring auspices, but a serious defect in the acoustics became apparent at once and this was only partly remedied by the installation of a sound-deflecting bell. The world premiere of Sergei Rachmaninoff's 3rd piano concerto took place on Sunday, November 28, 1909, at the New Theatre, with Rachmaninoff as soloist and Walter Damrosch conducting the New York Symphony Society. Several Shakespearean plays were given, by far the most notable presentation being that of The Winter's Tale. On the whole the company did its best ensemble work in some of the modern plays of that time, like Maeterlinck's The Blue Bird and Sister Beatrice, Galsworthy's Strife, and Edward Sheldon's The Nigger starring Annie Russell. A poetic drama of distinction was Josephine Preston Peabody's The Piper. In most cases the stage settings were of very high quality.

The building was located a mile north of the Theater District, and it was exceedingly expensive to maintain. Financially, the venture proved to be a boondoggle. At the end of the second season, the founders of the company decided to abandon the theatre and lease it out. Plans were made to construct a smaller building in the theatre district, but it was found to be impracticable and the company folded. The theatre critic William Winter wrote:

Not long ago an institution which was expected to benefit the Stage and the Public went down in miserable failure, in the collapse of the New Theatre. The Directors of that institution provided 'practically unlimited capital' for the venture, — an aid which Lester Wallack, for one, never had and never dreamed of having. The observer of to-day was able to see at first hand exactly what kind of theatrical company could be formed after a long absence of stock-companies; half a million dollars was lost in the effort, and persons of experience, knowledge, and taste have had an opportunity to see what the much-vaunted 'commercialism' has really done for the American Stage, and how necessary it is that other forces should control it.

=== Century Theatre ===
In 1911, the building was leased to other theatre managers, who changed the name to the Century Theatre, the Century Opera House (1913), and the Century once more (1915), with Florenz Ziegfeld as manager.

From Europe in 1912 came Judith Gautier and Pierre Loti, producers and supervisors of The Daughter of Heaven. Despite their efforts, the critic of The New York Times found the play "rich in spectacle, but dramatically deficient", and the scene changes tedious and "long delayed".

In 1917, producers Florenz Ziegfeld and Charles Dillingham opened the roof garden as a nightclub and named it the Cocoanut Grove, based on the success of a similar venue, Ziegfeld Midnight Frolic at the New Amsterdam Theatre. During the Naismith Basketball Hall of Fame franchise's first official season of existence under that name, the Original Celtics franchise hosted the majority of their home games for the 1918–19 season (which were held during the weekends) at the Century Theatre. (While they averaged crowds of around 4,000 fans per game during the games the Celtics hosted that season, the highest amount of fans in a game they hosted was 5,600 for a match against the Edison Indians team from New London, Wisconsin.) The "Shrine of Snobbism", as the WPA Guide called it, was demolished in 1930. The next year, the Art Deco Century Apartments (designed and developed by the office of Irwin S. Chanin) was completed on the Century Theatre's site.

== Gallery ==
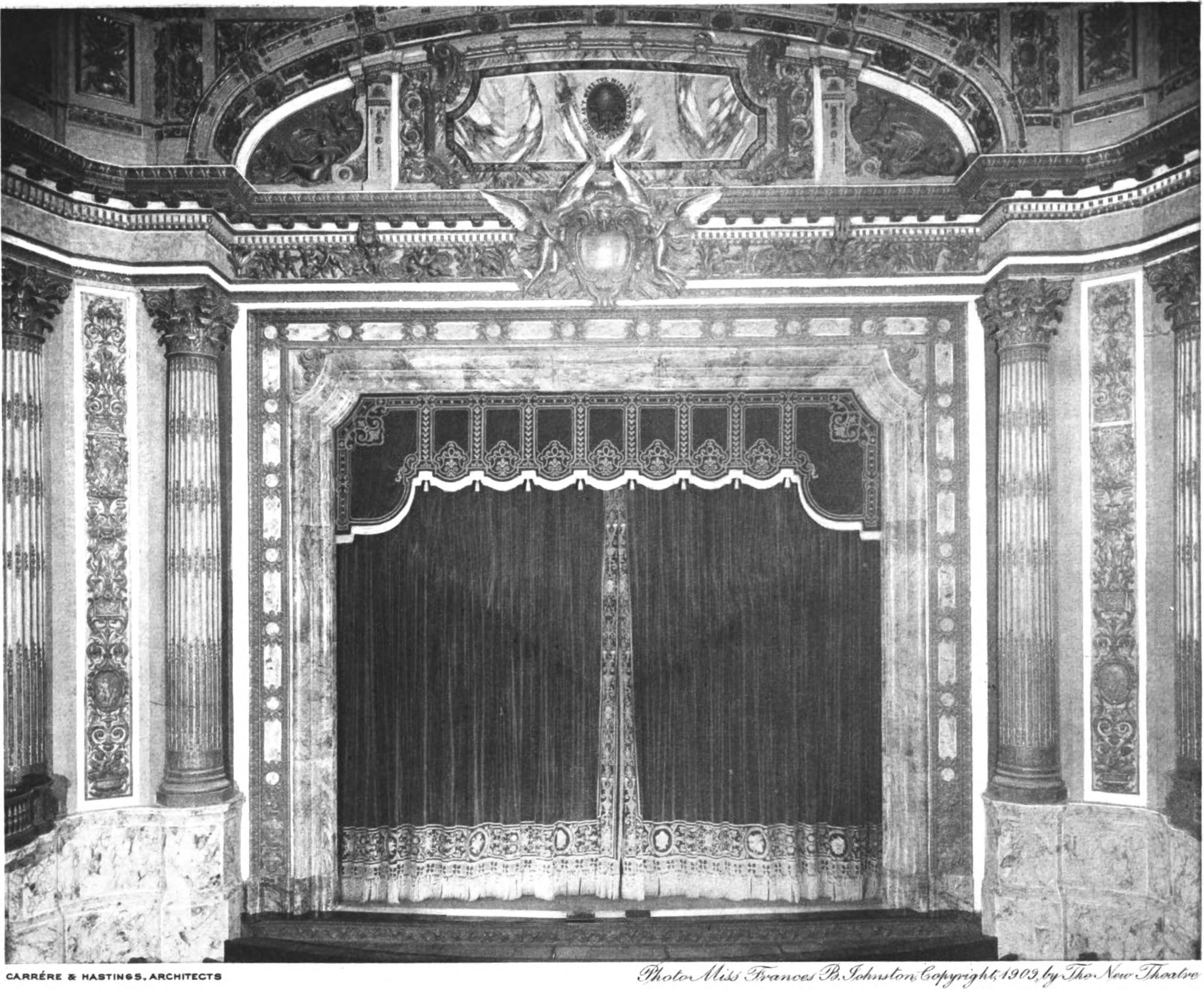
Proscenium and curtain

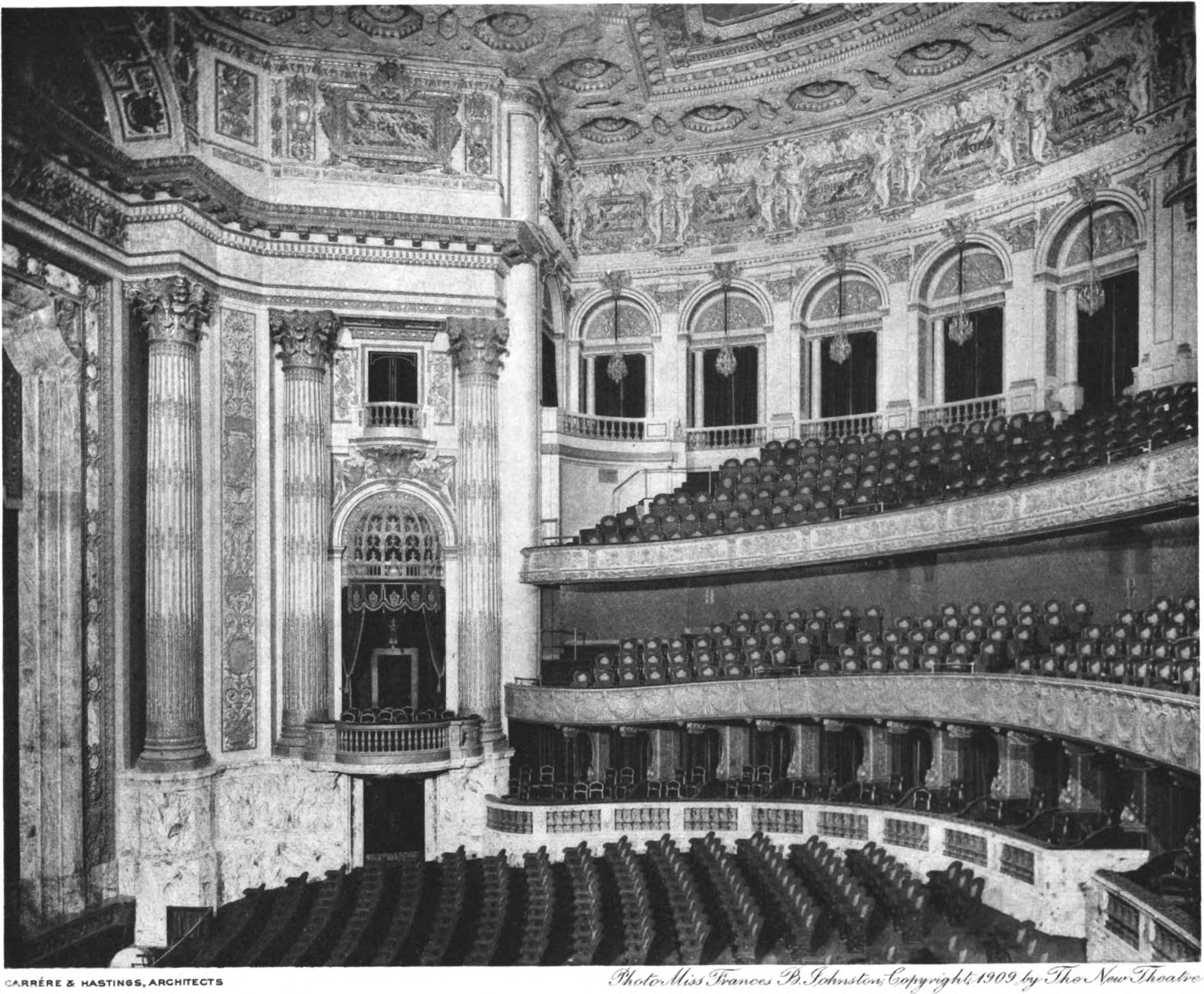
Auditorium

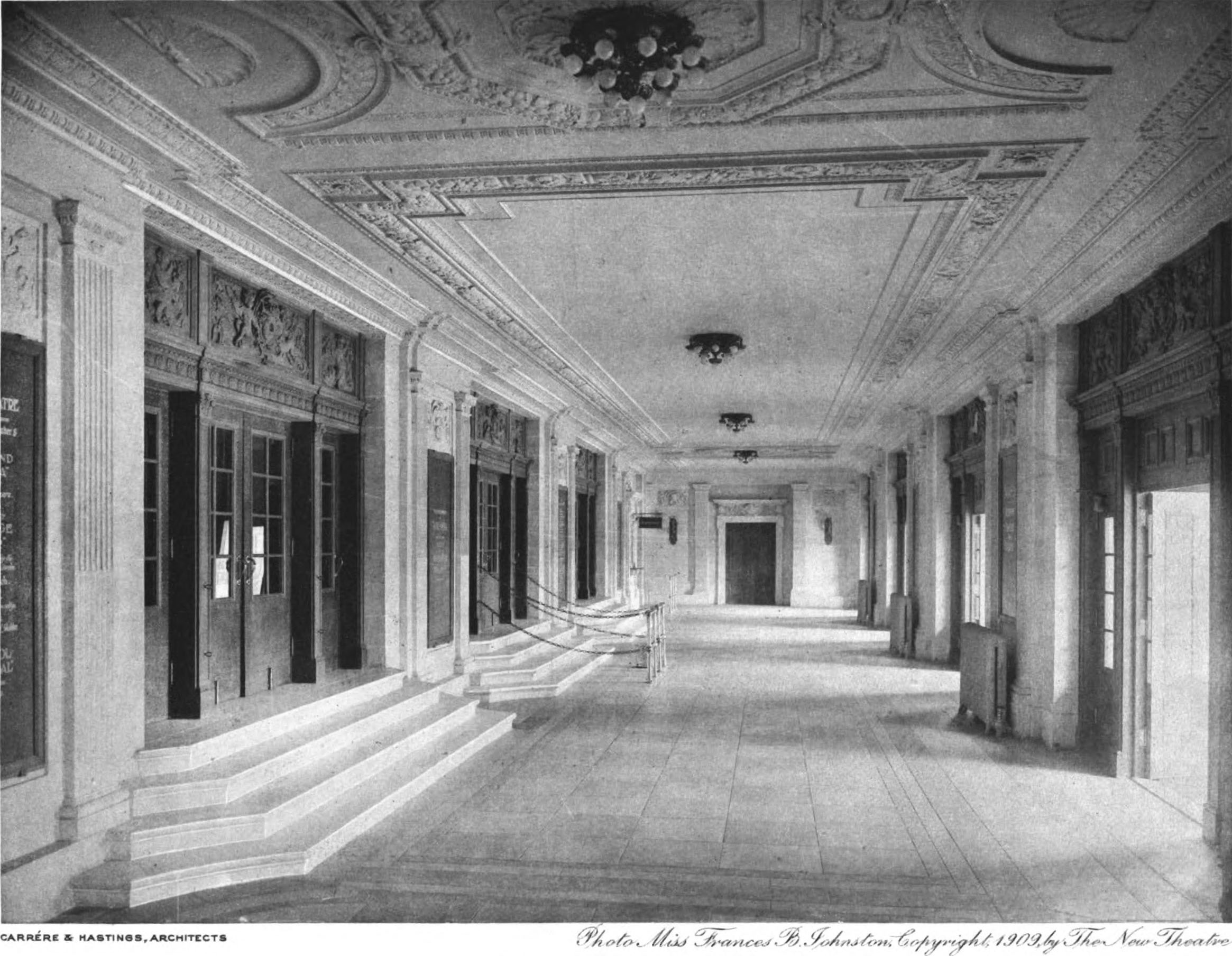
Main vestibule

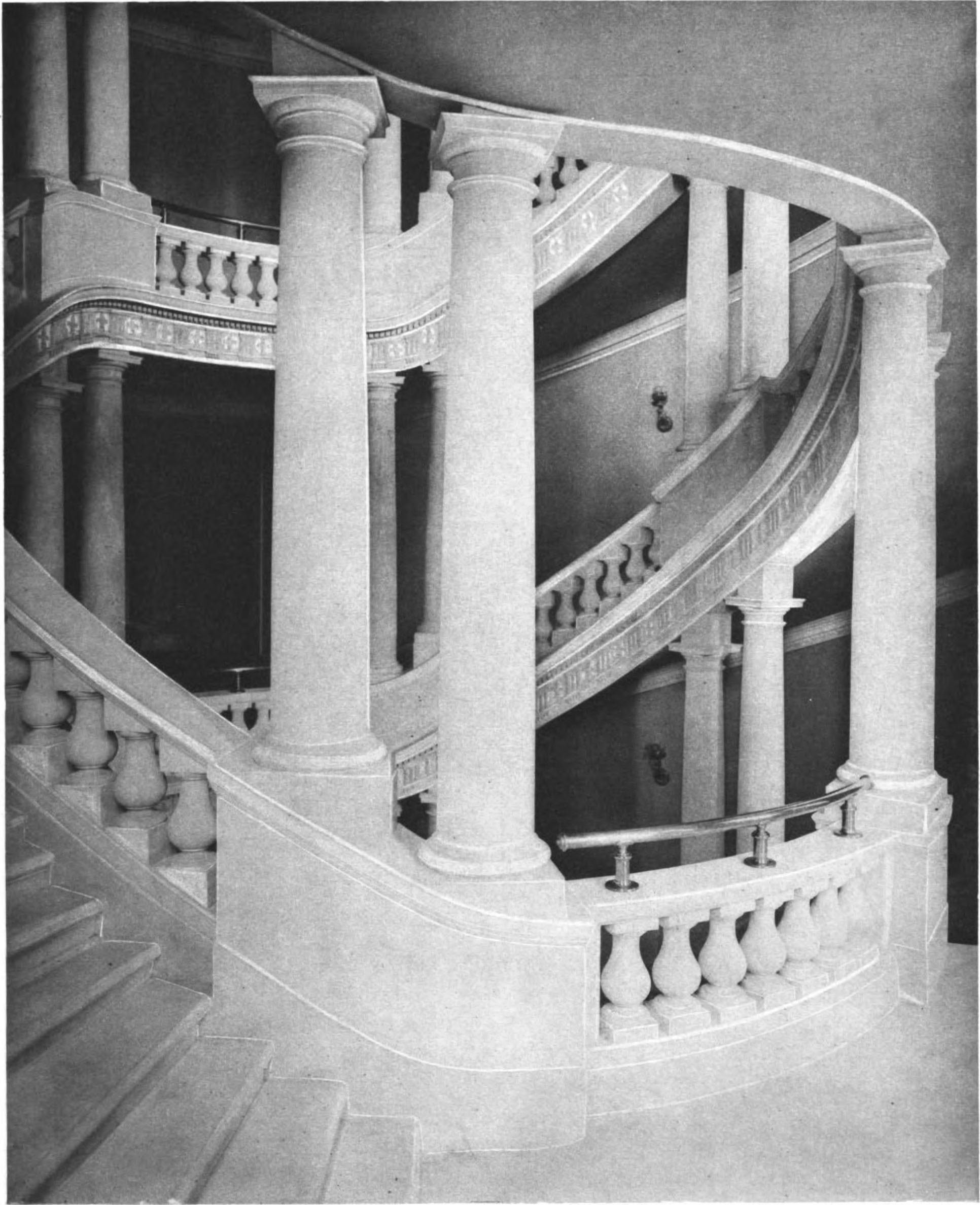
Staircases

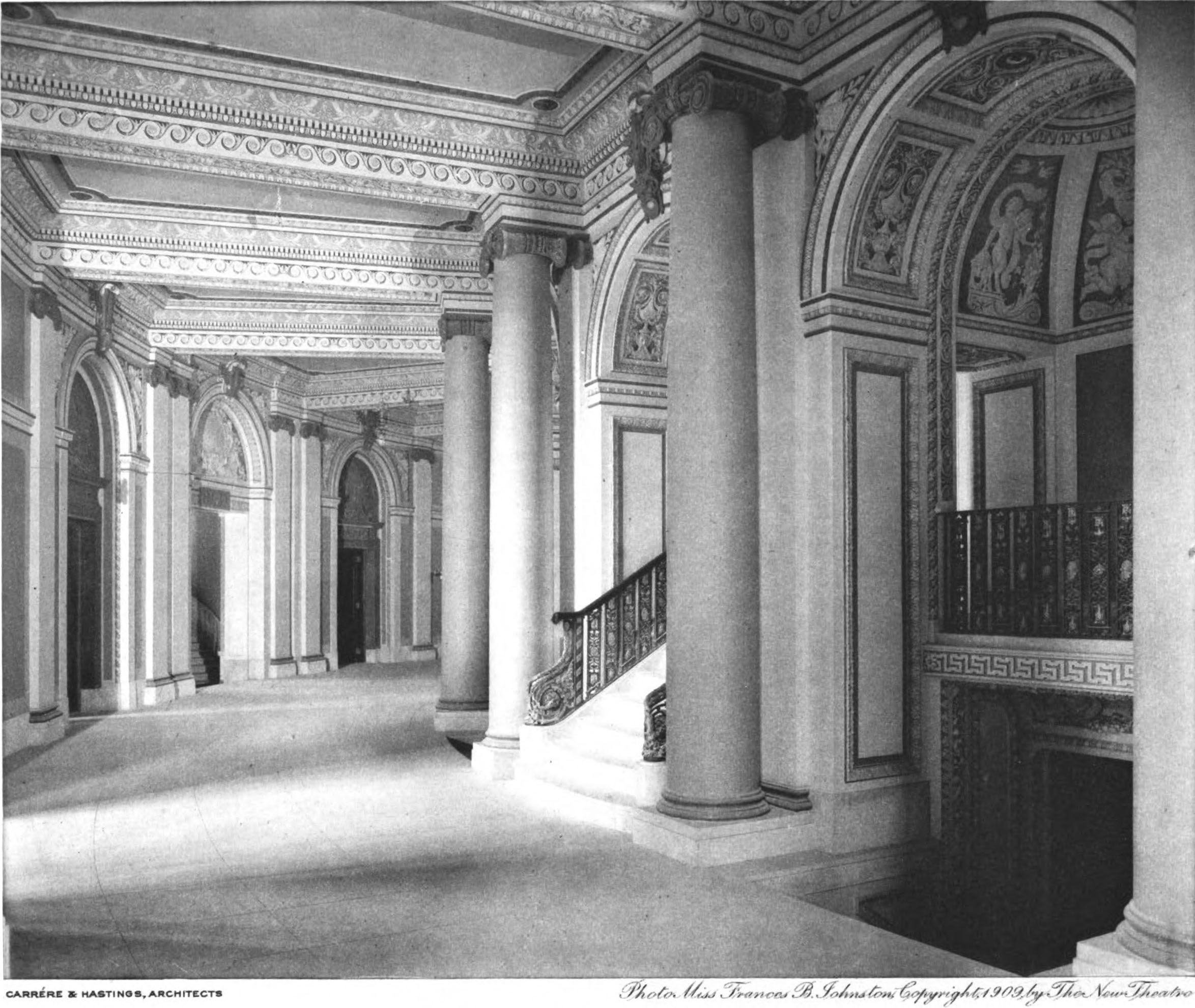
Foyer-level circulation

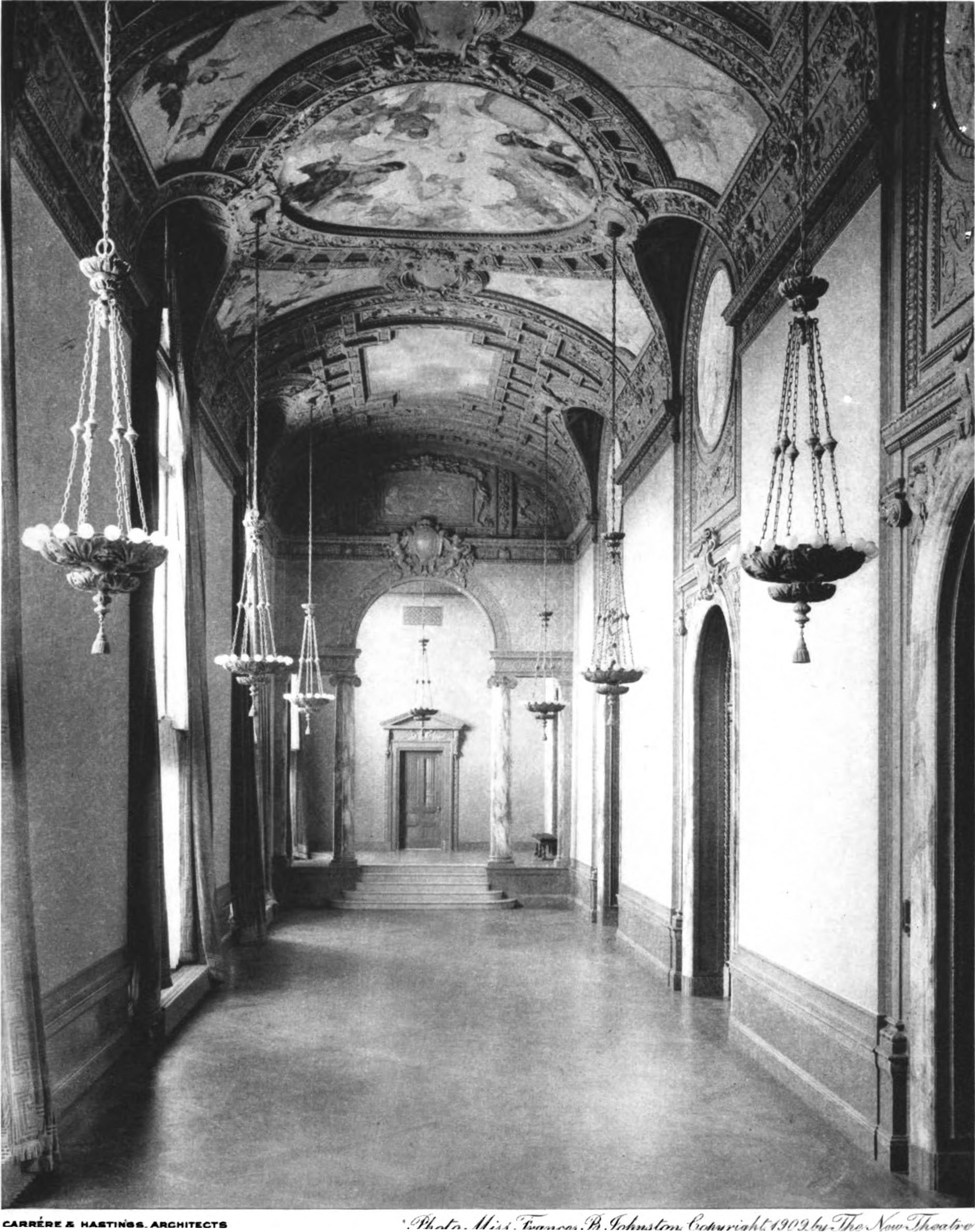
Main foyer

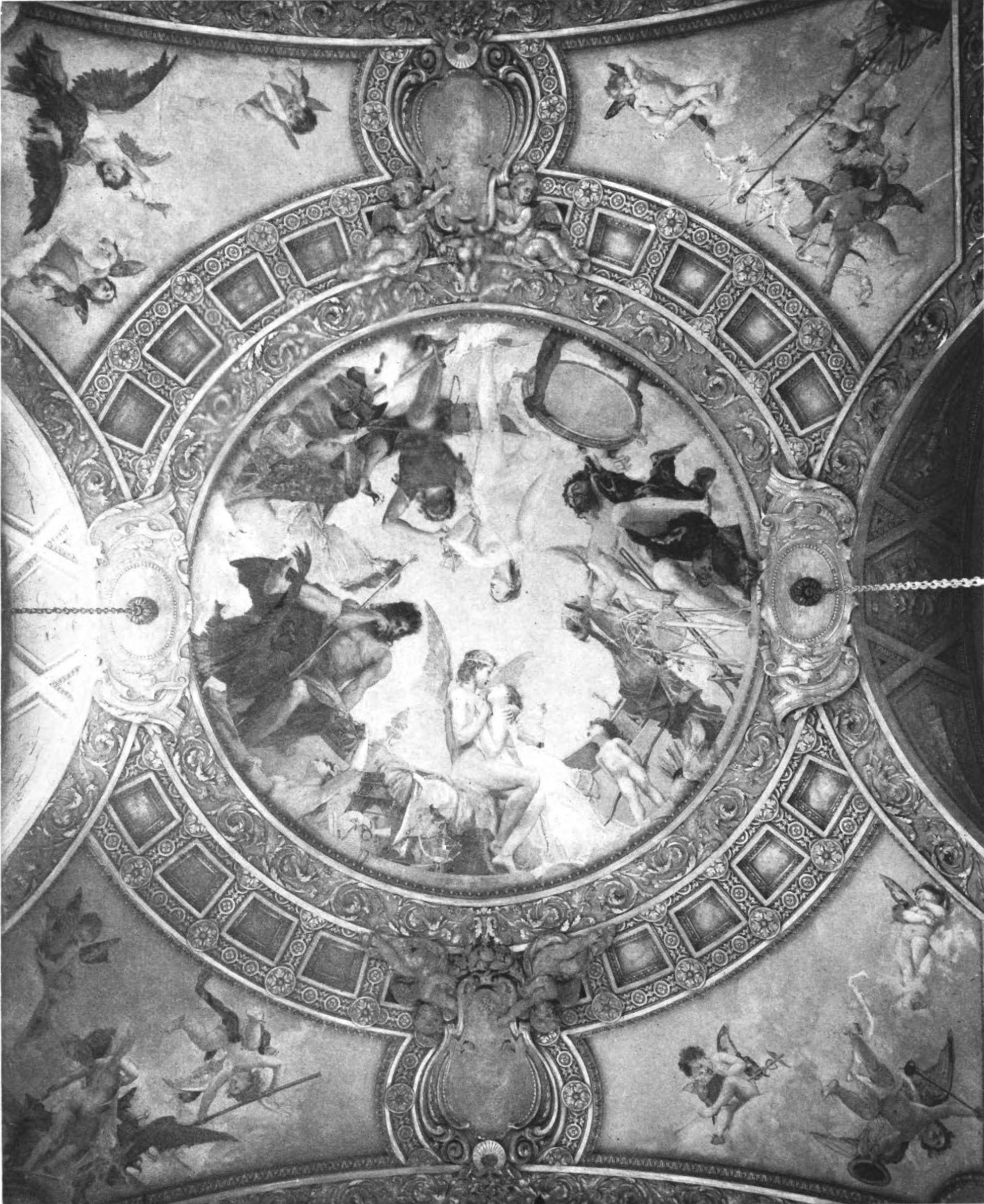
Foyer ceiling, central panel

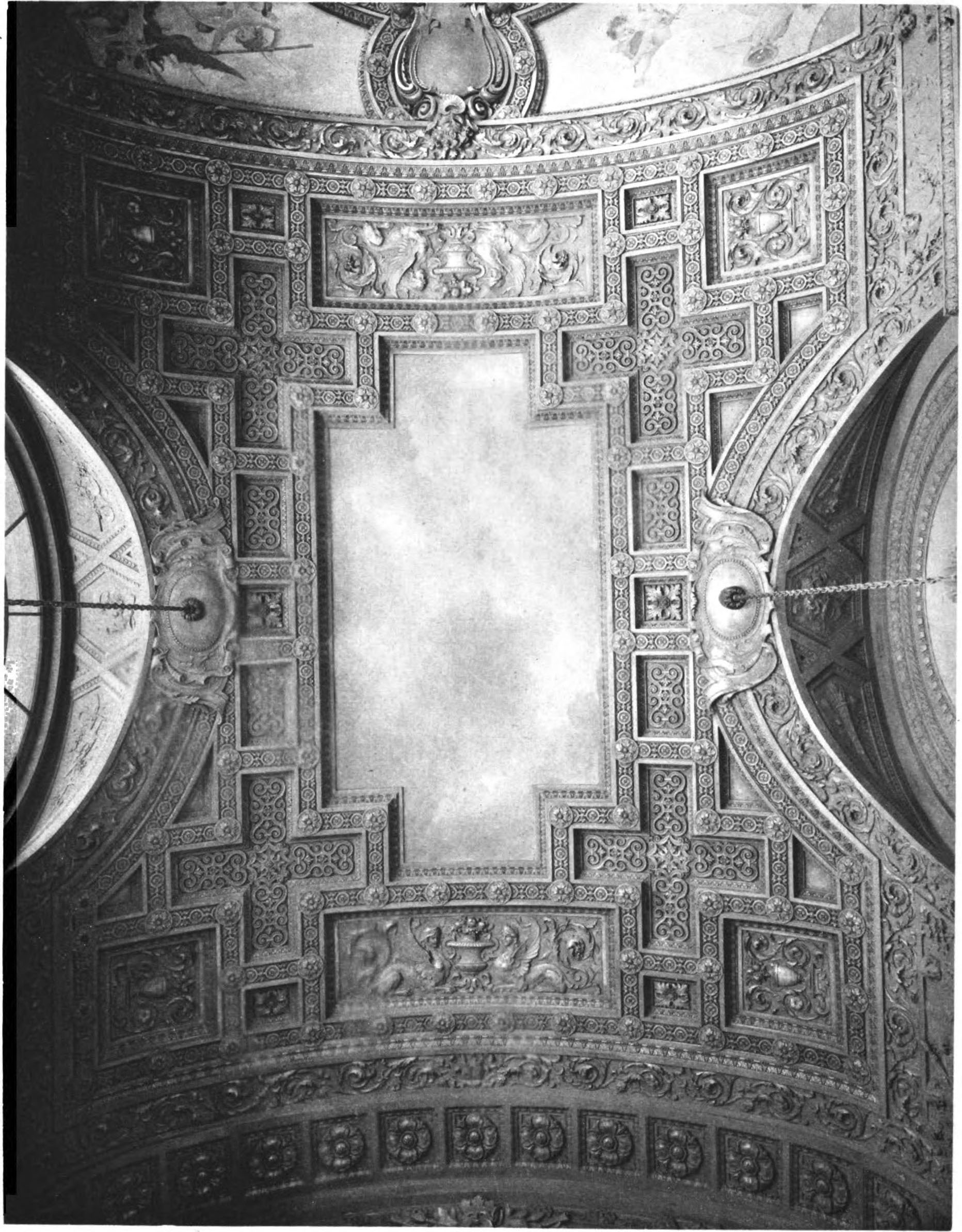
Foyer ceiling, secondary panel

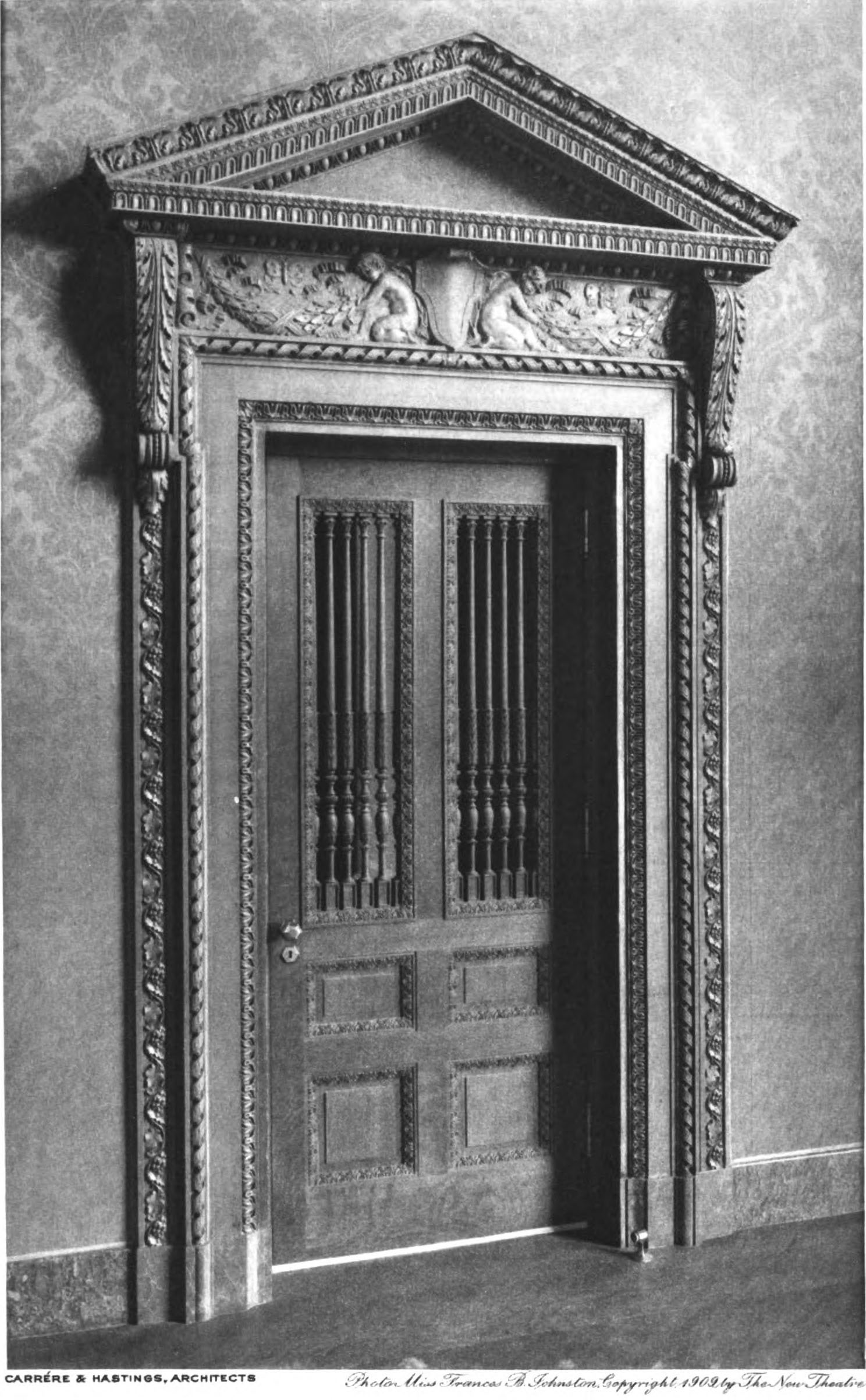
Foyer door

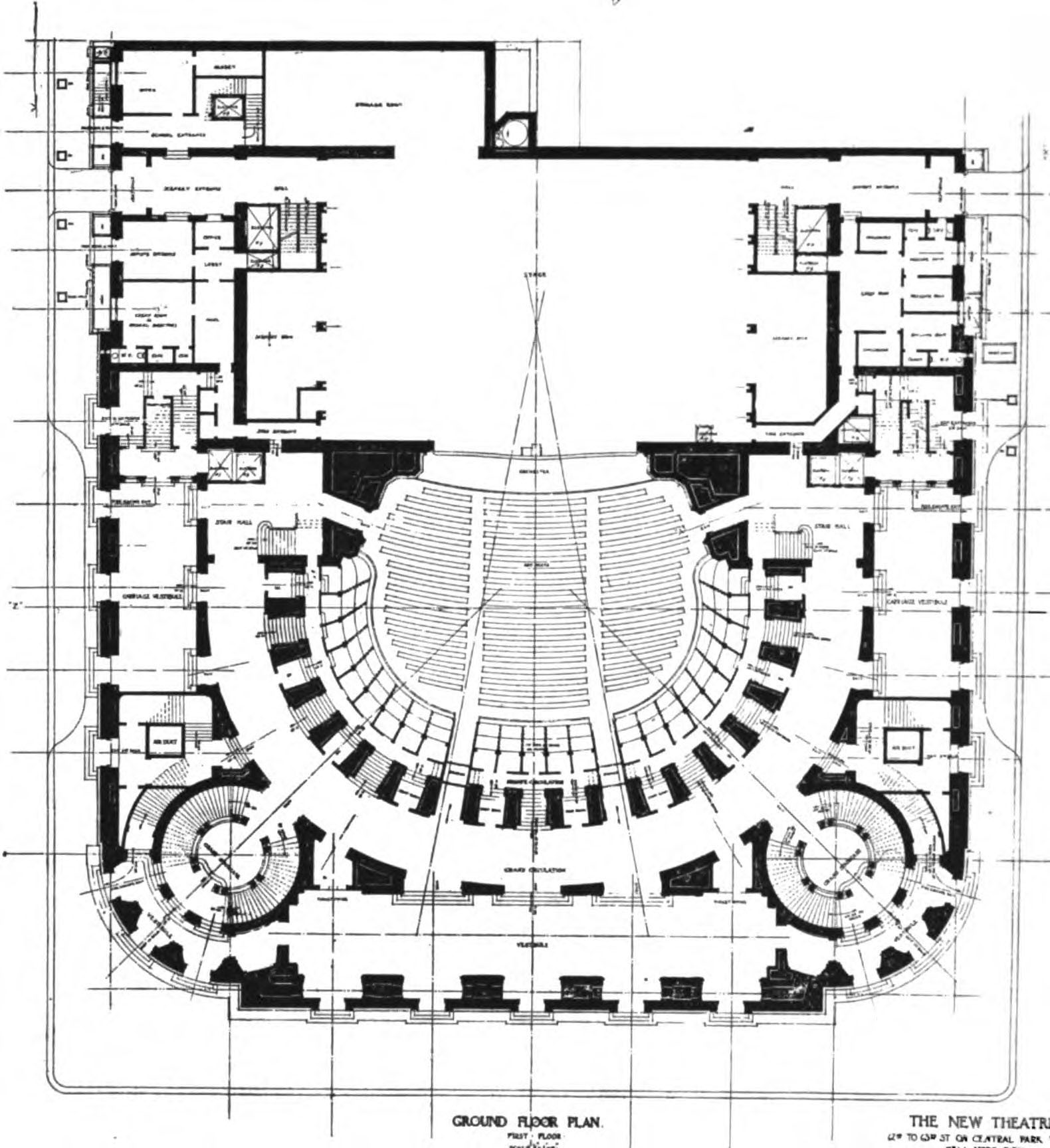
Ground floor plan

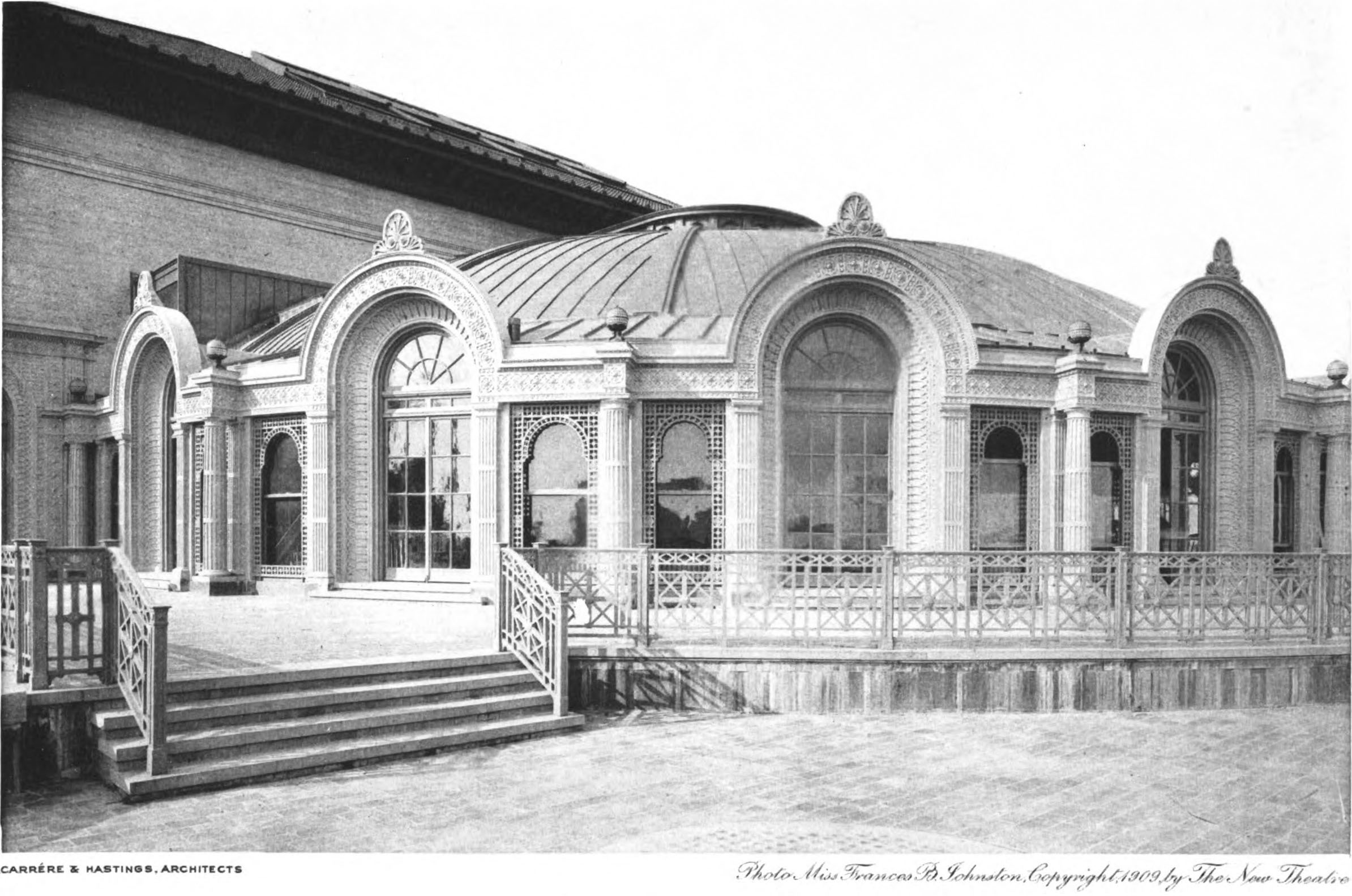
Rooftop Garden Pavilion

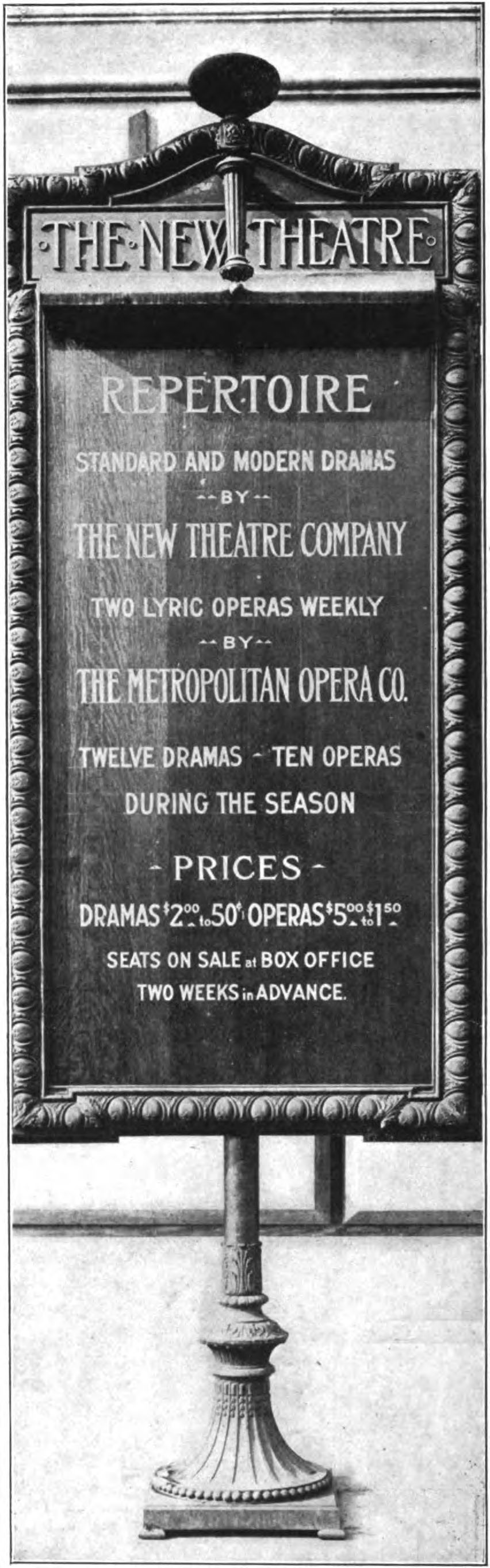
Poster case

== Sources ==
- Federal Writers' Project (1939). New York City Guide. New York: Random House. (Reprinted by Scholarly Press, 1976, ISBN 040302921X; often referred to as WPA Guide to New York City.)
- "Century Theatre" "New York"
- Louis N. Parker (1913). Joseph and His Brethren: A Pageant Play/Note – via Wikisource.
- New Theatre (1909). The New Theatre, New York. New York, New York: De Vinne Press.

names of founders, officers, etc., with biographical sketches and portraits of the company

- The New Theatre, Season 1909–10 (New York, 1910)

titles of plays, dates of production, casts, etc.
