= Annie Russell =

American actress (1864–1936)

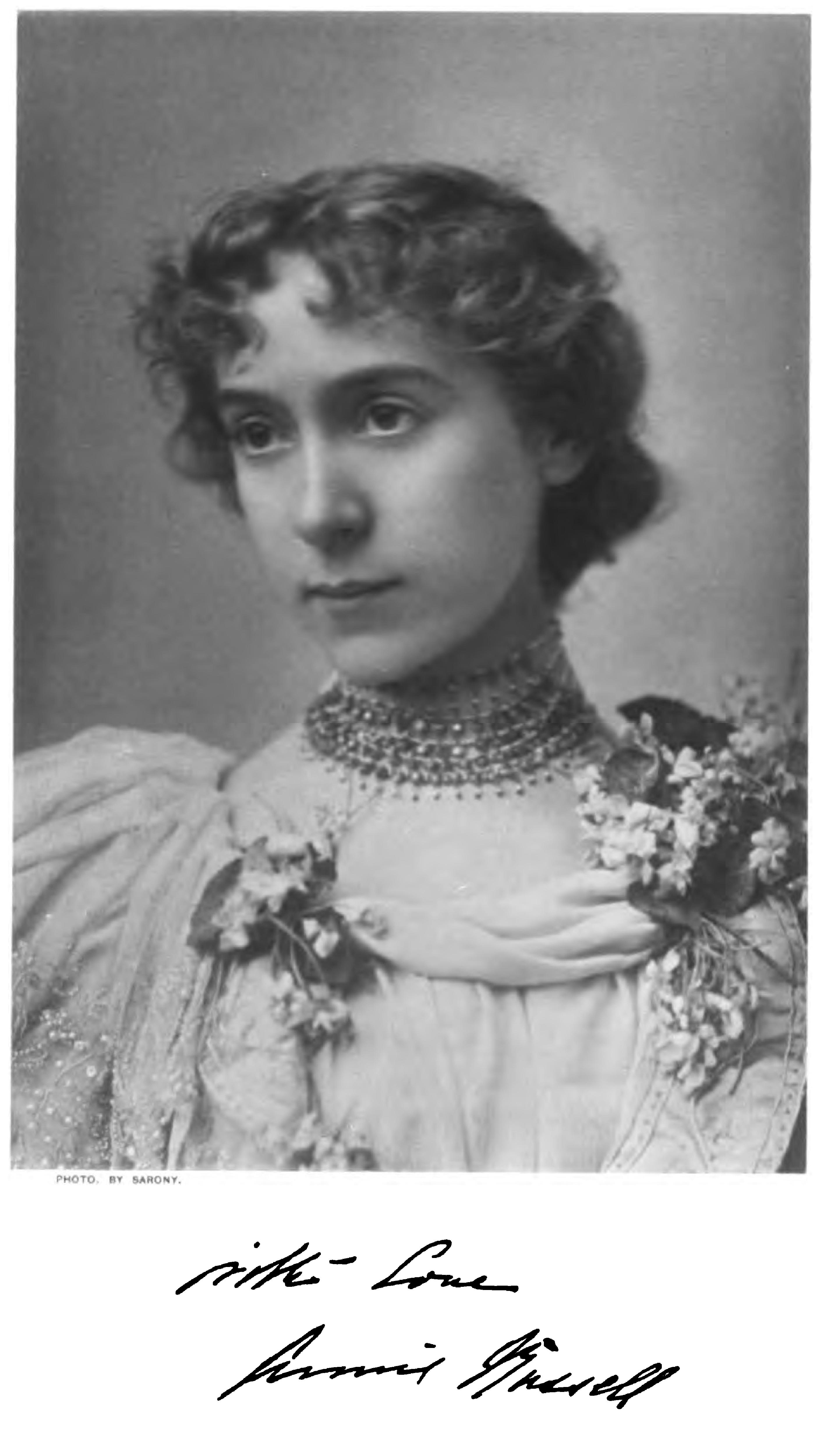
- Russell pictured in c. 1899
- Born: Annie Ellen Russell; 12 January 1864; Liverpool, England
- Died: 16 January 1936 (aged 72); Winter Park, Florida, U.S.
- Occupations: Actress and teacher
- Writing career
- Years active: 1872–1918

Annie Ellen Russell (12 January 1864 – 16 January 1936) was a British-American stage actress.

== Early life ==
Russell was born in Liverpool, England to Irish parents, Joseph Russell and Jane Mount. She moved to Canada when she was a child. She made her first appearance on the stage at eight years old with Rose Eytinge at the Montreal Academy of Music in Montreal, Canada. She visited the West Indies when she was twelve, overseeing her younger brother Tommy, the child actor in a touring production.

== Career ==
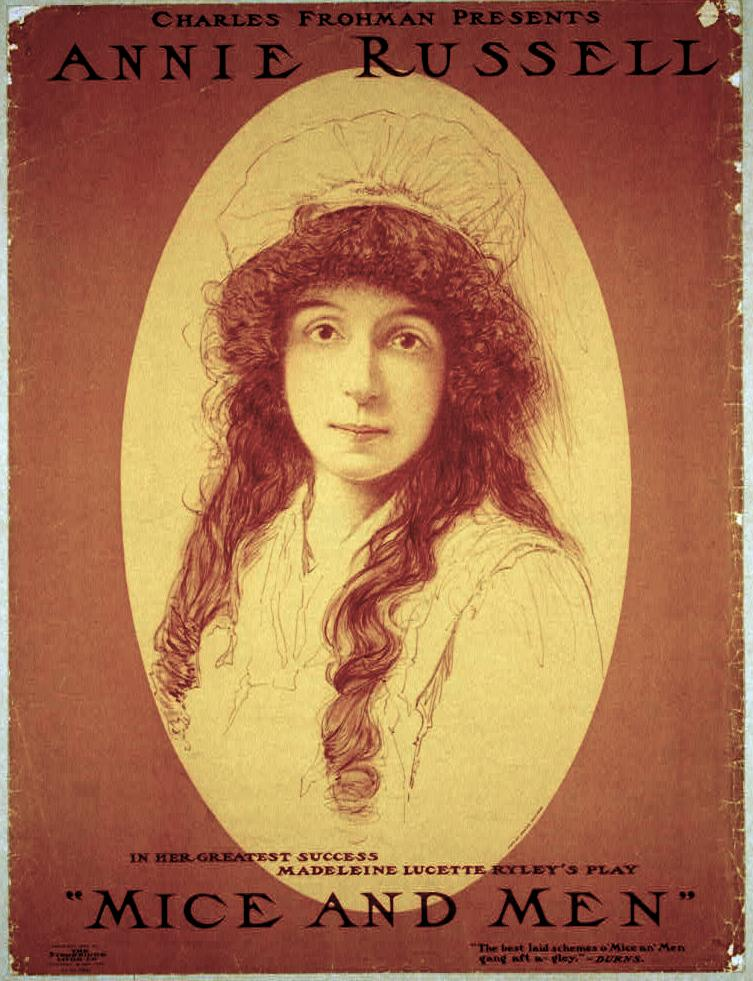
Annie Russell in Mice and Men

In 1881, in New York City, she performed in Esmerelda, a play written by Frances Hodgson Burnett and William Gillette. This play would later become one of her most successful and popular performances. Notwithstanding, reviews for the play, and for Russell's performance, were becoming unfavourable by the ninth month of the play's run—the reviewer says of her performance: "If she cares for her future, she will not waste time in spoiling her voice. ...Lacking knowledge and training, she screams in a most unhappy fashion." It ran for a year at the Madison Square Theatre and had over two hundred showings.

After Esmerelda, Russell did not perform on a similar scale for a few years. However, she was not completely removed from theatrical life. In 1883, she joined the New York Fifth Avenue Theatre company, with her mother, Jane, and little brother, Tommy. She performed in one of the tour companies of the play Hazel Kirke, in the title role, before leaving to marry her first husband in 1884.

Russell shortly fell ill—the first reported illness of many throughout her career. She returned in 1885, playing Zaire in the play Broken Hearts written by W. S. Gilbert. Later in the year, she performed in Young Mrs. Winthrop with the Palmer Company in Philadelphia. She later returned to New York with the same company to perform at Madison Square Theatre as Ada in Sealed Intentions. which received a stellar review on opening night. She performed in Engaged as Maggie McFarland starting in 1886, where acclaim for her performances began to mount. A reviewer in The New York Times said she "Imparts the charm that belongs to her delicate beauty." Other performances in 1886 that Russell performed in with A. M. Palmer's company at Madison Square Theatre include Young Mrs. Winthrop as Edith Our Society and Love's Martyr.

In 1887, Annie Russell earned the title role in the play Elaine by George Parsons Lathrop and Harry Edwards, a play later adopted by Mr. Palmer's company. Also in 1887, she played the role of Sylvia in an adaptation of L'Monde ou l'on ennuie originally by Édouard Pailleron.

After a brief illness, Russell returned to the Madison Square Theatre company on a tour to San Francisco in 1888 in Partners. She continued to appear in more plays afterward including Captain Swift in 1889. This was her last role before an extended illness in 1890.

Russell remained with Mr. Palmer's company at the Madison Square Theatre until 1894, upon joining Charles Frohman's company, Empire Stock. She returned to the stage in 1894, playing the lead female part in The New Woman. She reprised her role in Esmerelda in 1894 as well. By 1895, Annie Russell appeared in an increasing number of plays; including Ambition (1895) at the Fifth Avenue Theatre with Nat Goodwin. She performed in a new one-act play called Lethe. Later that year, she appeared in a prelude to Romeo and Juliet called Romeo's First Love and in The Gilded Fool, which earned Russell more critical acclaim. Towards the end of the year, she took a new role in Senator and Ingenue as Ruth.

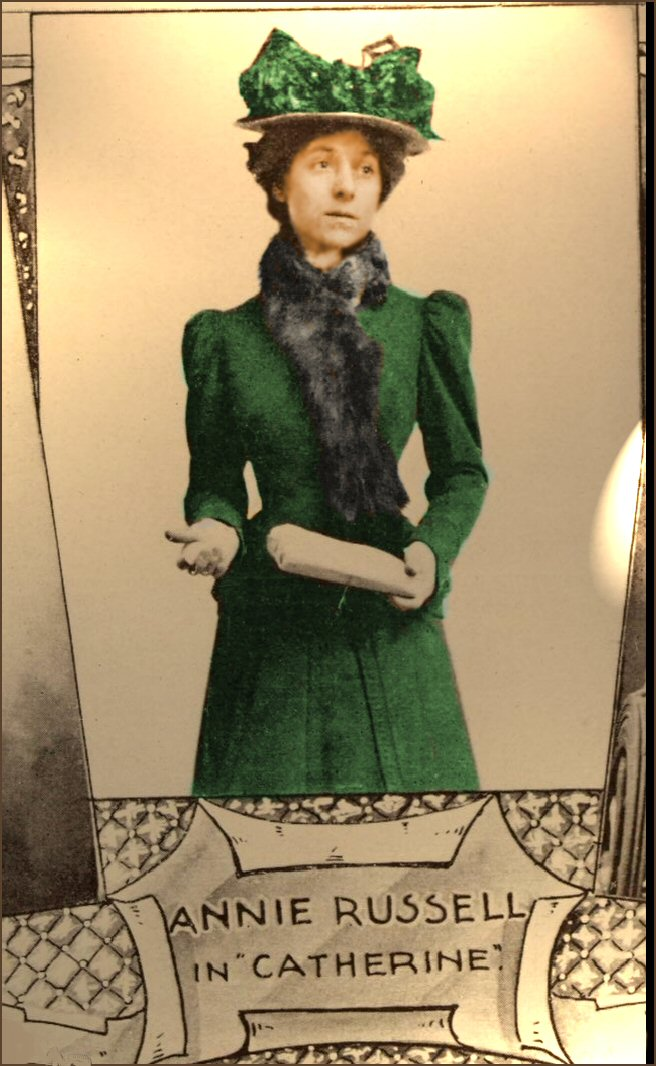
Annie Russell, English actress, in 1898

After an extended stay in Europe, Russell returned to the stage in Bret Harte's play Sue. She later reprised this role in London in 1898 at the Garrick Theatre. In the interim, she appeared in The Mysterious Mr. Bugle as Betty Fondacre, A Bachelor's Romance, Salt of the Earth, and Dangerfield '95. She performed many of her popular plays in London, including Sue and The Mysterious Mr. Bugle. She fell ill partway through 1899 and in June of that year returned to the United States to rest. She did, however, appear in a few plays, in 1899, Miss Hobbs with Ann Gilbert and in 1900 in A Royal Family.

In 1902, Russell appeared in other plays with Ann Gilbert, in The Girl and the Judge. The play had great success, and ran from December 1901 to the fall of 1902. Subsequently, Russell starred in Mice and Men, still with Frohman's company. On December 30, 1902, Mrs. Roosevelt and other Washington dignitaries saw Russell perform in this play.

In 1903, Annie Russell performed in Boston, playing the title role in The Younger Mrs. Parling. She met her second husband, English actor Oswald Yorke in this play. Shortly after her marriage, Russell starred in a new play Brother Jacques.

Annie Russell returned to London in 1905. Her first play upon her return was the role Barbara Undershaft in Bernard Shaw's Major Barbara in that same year, Shaw having written the part with Annie Russell specifically in mind. Her husband Oswald Yorke played the part of Bill Walker in the same production. She later returned to the United States, appearing in Friend Hannah in 1906. In the same year, she performed in A Midsummer Night's Dream at the newly built Astor Theatre in Boston.

In 1908 she appeared with Robert Drouet in The Stronger Sex. Wagenhals & Kemper, owners of a company that Russell was a part of, bought land to build a $300,000 theatre bearing her name in New York City. It was described to be "state-of-the-art." In 1910, she joined the New Theatre Company, New York, appearing in Twelfth Night (1910) and The Nigger (1909.) She performed Twelfth Night in Washington for President Taft and the first Lady, Helen Taft. She appeared in a number of small plays, one under Charles Frohman's management, and in Gordon's Wife under Leibler Company until 1912, when she organized the Old English Comedy Company. They occupied The Princess Theatre in New York, a small theatre of 299 seats. A special feature of her new theatre company was that special matinées for schoolchildren on Fridays and Saturdays were performed, in addition to performances for private schools.

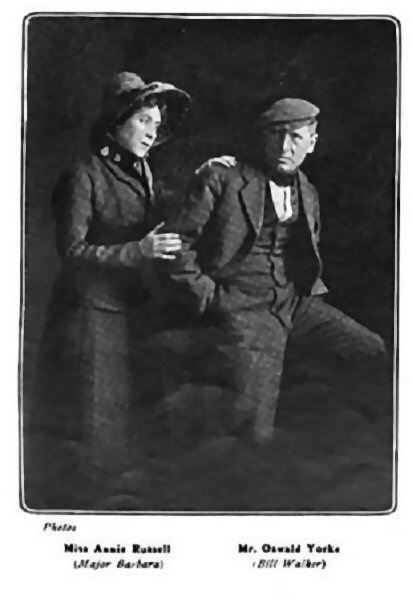
with actor husband Oswald Yorke in Major Barbara

== Personal life ==
She married playwright and stage manager Eugene Wiley Presbrey (1853–1931) on 6 November 1884, and divorced him in 1897. She married English actor Oswald Harker (stage name Oswald Yorke) on 27 March 1904, and divorced him in 1929. She had no children from either marriage.

Russell suffered from periodic illnesses throughout her life, contributing to large gaps in her career. In late December 1890, many of her professional friends arranged a testimonial to be performed in February 1891. A. M. Palmer, her company manager, offered free use of his theatre to stage the event. Three prominent theatre companies of the time volunteered to participate: the Madison Square Theatre Company, Daniel Frohman's Lyceum Theatre Company, and Charles Frohman's Twenty-Third Street Theatre Company. The testimonial was performed February 10, 1891, and earned $3,000 to offset medical and other costs.

She also gave several speeches to drama students, the first speech to the graduates of the American Academy of Dramatic Arts in March 1902.

Russell was close friends with Mary Louise Curtis Bok Zimbalist, who would later contribute financially to the theatre in Russel's name

== Later years and death ==
Russell officially retired from the stage in 1918 and moved to Winter Park, Florida. She was encouraged by a friend to teach at Rollins College, and in 1931, the Annie Russell Theatre was founded at the college. She opened the theatre in 1932 with a performance of In a Balcony.

She taught at Rollins College until her death on January 16, 1936. She was seventy-two years old. She was buried in St. Stephen's Cemetery in Millburn, New Jersey.
