= Anaïs Fargueil =

French actress (1819–1896)

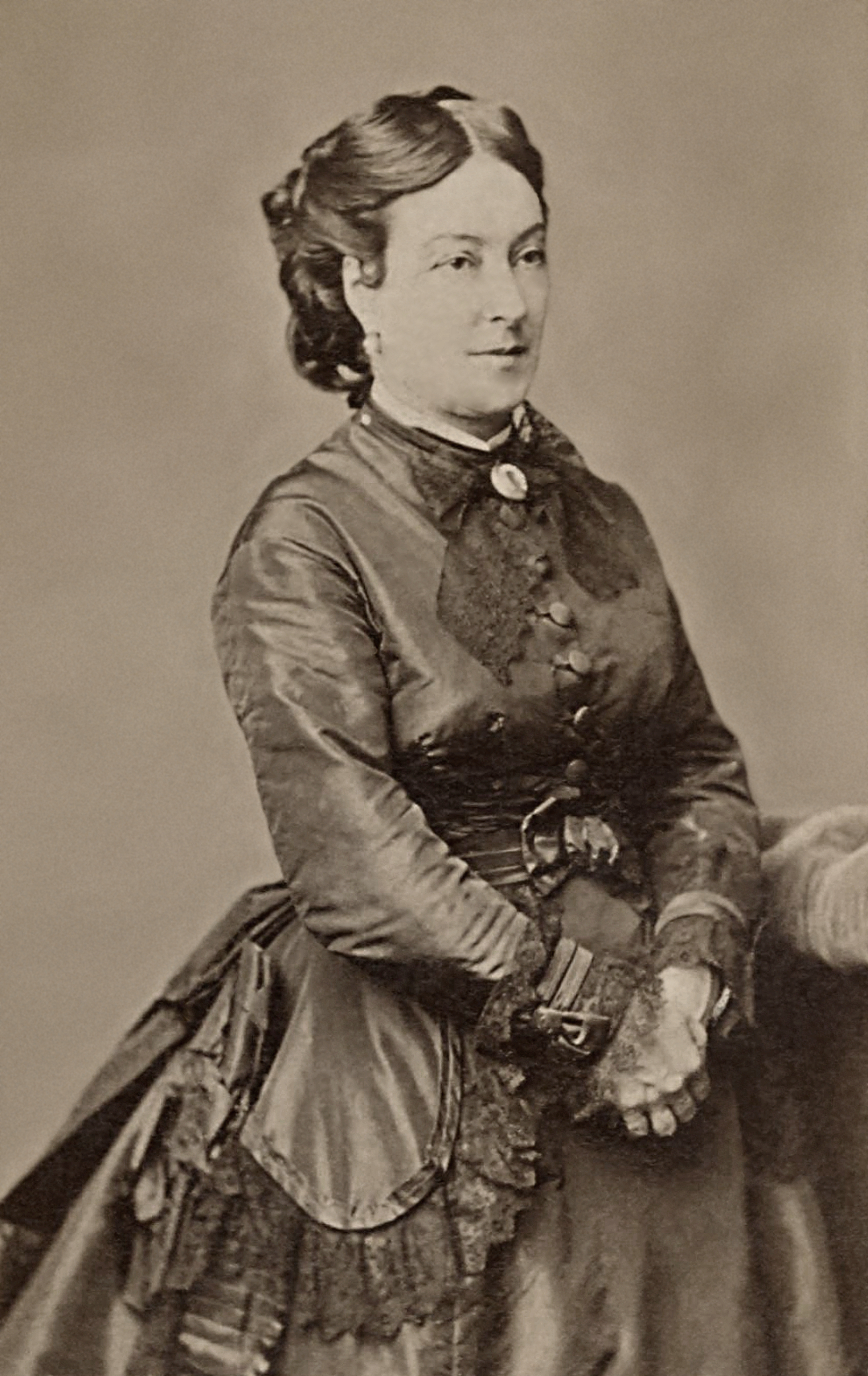
- Born: 21 March 1819; Toulouse, France
- Died: 8 April 1896 (aged 77); Paris, France
- Resting place: Montmartre Cemetery, Paris
- Occupation: Actress

Anaïs Fargueil (French pronunciation: [anais faʁɡœj]; 21 March 1819 – 8 April 1896) was a 19th-century French actress.

== Biography ==
Anaïs Fargueil was the daughter of Paul Fargueil, a Toulouse actor that made her start on stage from the age of four. In 1825, she followed her parents to Paris and entered the French National Academy of Dramatic Arts in the classes of Antoine Ponchard and Auguste Mathieu Panseron. She won first prize for singing. Committed to the Opéra-Comique, she made her debut in La Marquise by Adolphe Adam. She abandoned the opera for the theater and began at the Théâtre du Vaudeville in 1836. She left it for the Théâtre du Gymnase and toured the province and abroad. She returned to the Théâtre du Vaudeville in 1850 and retired in 1883.

She is buried at Montmartre Cemetery. Her father died on 14 December 1869 in the 9th arrondissement of Paris. Her daughter, Marguerite Le Rousseau-Fargueil, is buried on 24 April 1911 at Montmartre cemetery in the family vault.

== Theatre (selection of roles) ==
- 1836: Le Démon de la nuit, two-act comédie en vaudeville, by Jean-François Bayard and Étienne Arago, Théâtre du Vaudeville, 18 May (role of Mathilde)
- 1840: Marcelin, three-act drama, by Jean-François Bayard and Dumanoir, Théâtre du Vaudeville, 30 May (Elise de Montdidier)
- 1842: La dragonne, two-act comedy by Dumanoir and Hippolyte Le Roux, Théâtre du Palais Royal, 13 October (Catherine II)
- 1853: Les Filles de marbre, five-act drama by Théodore Barrière and Lambert-Thiboust, Théâtre du Vaudeville, 17 May
- 1855: Le Mariage d'Olympe, three-act play by Émile Augier, Théâtre du Vaudeville, 17 July
- 1860: Les Femmes fortes, comedy by Victorien Sardou, Théâtre du Vaudeville, 31 December
- 1861: Esther Ramel, three-act play by Édouard Devicque and Henri Crisafulli, Théâtre du Vaudeville, 10 June
- 1861: Nos intimes !, comedy by Victorien Sardou, Théâtre du Vaudeville, 16 November (role of Cécile)
- 1863: Lucie Didier, three-act play by Léon Battu and Jaime fils
- 1863: Les Brebis de Panurge, one-act comedy, in prose by Henri Meilhac and Ludovic Halévy
- 1863: Les Diables noirs, four-act drama by Victorien Sardou, Théâtre du Vaudeville, 28 November
- 1865: La Famille Benoiton, five-act comedy by Victorien Sardou, Théâtre du Vaudeville, 4 November
- 1866: Maison neuve, five-act comedy by Victorien Sardou, Théâtre du Vaudeville, 4 December
- 1866: Rédemption, d'Octave Feuillet, Paris, Théâtre du Vaudeville, 4 December
- 1869: Patrie !, five-act historical drama, in 8 scenes by Victorien Sardou
- 1869: Miss Multon, three-act comedy by Eugène Nus and Adolphe Belot
- 1870: Les Pattes de mouches, three-act comedy by Victorien Sardou, Théâtre du Vaudeville, 24 February
- 1871: L'Ennemie, three-act comedy by Eugène Labiche, Théâtre du Vaudeville, 17 October
- 1873: L'Oncle Sam, four-act comedy by Victorien Sardou, Théâtre du Vaudeville, 6 November
- 1875: Rose Michel, five-act drama by Ernest Blum, Théâtre de l'Ambigu-Comique, 21 January
- 1881: Madame de Maintenon, five-act drama, with prologue, in verse, by François Coppée, Théâtre de l'Odéon, 12 April (Madame de Maintenon)

== Sources ==
- André Maurel, « Anaïs Fargueil », Le Figaro, 10 April 1896, p. 2
