= Roles played by Sarah Bernhardt =

This is a list of the notable roles played by the French actress Sarah Bernhardt, including both stage roles and early motion pictures, with the year of the first performance. Roles first performed by Bernhardt are noted as premieres.

== Theatrical roles ==
ill.	Year	Play	Author	Role	Theatre	Note
	1858	Tobias Regains His Sight	Mère Sainte-Thérèse	The angel Raphael	Convent at Grand-champs, Versailles	Performed in honour of the archbishop of Paris on his visit to the convent where Sarah was a pupil.
	1861	Les Enfants d'Edouard	Casimir Delavigne	Edouard V	Théâtre de la Tour d'Auvergne, Paris	male role
	1861	Les Premières Armes de Richelieu	Jean-François Bayard / Dumanoir	Richelieu	Théâtre de la Tour d'Auvergne, Paris	male role
	1862	Iphigénie	Racine	title role	Comédie Française	
	1862	Valérie	Eugene Scribe / Mélesville	title role	Comédie Française	
	1862	Les Femmes Savantes	Molière	Henriette	Comédie Française	
	1862	L'Etourdi	Molière	Hippolyte	Comédie Française	
	1863	Le Père de la Debutante	Emmanuel Théaulon and Jean-François Bayard	Anita	Gymnase	1863, 23 June
	1863	Le Démon du Jeu	Théodore Barrière and Henri Crisafulli	Amélie de Villefontaine	Gymnase	premiere 1863, 16 July
	1863	Un Soufflet n'est Jamais Perdu	Jean-François Bayard	Jeannette	Gymnase	
	1863	La Maison sans Enfants	Dumanoir	Madame de Rives	Gymnase	
	1863	L'Etourneau	Jean-François Bayard and Léon Laya	Anita	Gymnase	
	1863	Le Premier Pas (fr)	Eugène Labiche & Raimond Deslandes	Clémence	Gymnase	
	1864	Un Mari qui Lance sa Femme (fr)	Eugène Labiche & Raimond Deslandes	Princesse Douchinka, later Mme Dieudonné	Gymnase	1864, 23 April
	1865	La Biche aux Bois (fr)	Brothers Charles-Théodore and Hippolyte Cogniard (frères Cogniard) with music by Auguste Pilati	Princess Désirée	Théâtre Porte Sainte-Martin	Sarah not mentioned in the first cast.
	1866	Le Jeu de l'Amour et du Hasard	Marivaux	Silvia	Théâtre de l'Odéon, Paris	
	1866	Phèdre	Racine	Aricie	Théâtre de l'Odéon	
	1867	Les Femmes Savantes	Molière	Armande	Théâtre de l'Odéon	Same play, other role, other theatre 7 years later
	1867	Aux Arrêts	Edmond de Boissière	Amélie	Théâtre de l'Odéon	1867, 27 February
	1867	Britannicus	Racine	Albine	Théâtre de l'Odéon	
	1867	Britannicus	Racine	Junie	Théâtre de l'Odéon	
	1867	Le Malade Imaginaire	Molière	Angélique	Théâtre de l'Odéon	
	1867	Le Legs (The Legacy) (fr)	Marivaux	Hortense	Théâtre de l'Odéon	
	1867	Athalie	Racine	Zarcharie	Théâtre de l'Odéon	male role
	1867	Le Testament de César Girodot	Alexandre Belot and Edmond Villetard	Hortense	Théâtre de l'Odéon	
	1867	Le Marquis de Villemer	George Sand	Baronne d'Arglade	Théâtre de l'Odéon	
	1867	François le Champi	George Sand	Mariette	Théâtre de l'Odéon	
	1868	Kean, ou Désordre et génie	Alexander Dumas père, Théaulon de Lambert and Frédéric de Courcy	Anna Damby	Théâtre de l'Odéon	1868, 17 February
	1868	Le Roi Lear (King Lear)	Shakespeare	Cordelia	Théâtre de l'Odéon	1868, 6 April
	1867	Le Drame de la Rue de la Paix	Adolphe Belot	Julia Vidal	Théâtre de l'Odéon	1868, 5 November
	1868	La Loterie du Marriage	Jules Barbier	Laure Dufour	Théâtre de l'Odéon	premiere
	1869	La Gloire de Molière	Théodore de Banville		Théâtre de l'Odéon	
	1869	Le Passant	François Coppée	Zanetto	Théâtre de l'Odéon	Premiere 1869, 14 January male role
	1869	Le Bâtard	Alfred Touroude	Jeanne	Théâtre de l'Odéon	Premiere 1869, 18 September
	1870	L'Affranchi	Latour de Saint-Ybars	Bérénice	Théâtre de l'Odéon	premiere
	1870	L'Autre	George Sand	Hélène de Mérangis	Théâtre de l'Odéon	Premiere 1870, 25 February
	1871	Jean-Marie	André Theuriet	Thérése	Théâtre de l'Odéon	premiere
	1871	Fais ce que dois	François Coppée	Marthe	Théâtre de l'Odéon	1871, 21 October
	1871	La Baronne	Édouard Foussier and Charles Edmond	Geneviève	Théâtre de l'Odéon	1871, 23 November
	1871	L’Article 47	Adolphe Belot	Cora	Théâtre de l'Ambigu-Comique	1871, 20 October
	1872	Mademoiselle Aïssé	Louis Bouilhet	title role	Théâtre de l'Odéon	premiere
	1872	Ruy Blas	Victor Hugo	La reine (Doña Maria de Neubourg, Queen of Spain)	Théâtre de l'Odéon	1872, 24 February
	1872	Mademoiselle de Belle-Isle	Alexander Dumas pere	Gabrielle de Belle-Isle	Comédie-Française	Premiere 1872, 6 November
	1872	Le Cid	Corneille	Chimène		
	1872	Britannicus	Racine	Junie	Comédie-Française	Same play and role 5 years later in other theatre. 1872, 14 December
	1873	Le Mariage de Figaro	Beaumarchais	Chérubin	Comédie-Française	1873, 30 January Male role
	1873	Mademoiselle de la Seiglière (fr)	Jules Sandeau	Hélène	Comédie-Française	
	1873	Dalila	Octave Feuillet	Leonora, Princess Falconieri	Comédie-Française	1873, 28 March
	1873	L'Absent	Eugène Manuel	Mistress Douglas	Comédie-Française	premiere
	1873	Chez l'Avocat	Paul Ferrier	Marthe	Comédie-Française	premiere
	1873	Andromaque	Racine		Comédie-Française	
	1874	Le Péril dan la Demeure	Octave Feuillet	Caroline de la Roseraie	Comédie-Française	
	1874	Le Sphinx	Octave Feuillet	Berthe de Savigny	Comédie-Française	Premiere 1874, 23 March
	1874	La Belle Paule	Louis Denayrousse	Henri de Ligniville	Comédie-Française	premiere male role
	1874	Zaire	Voltaire	Zaire	Comédie-Française	1874, 6 August
	1874	Phèdre	Racine	Aricie	Comédie-Française	Same play and role in other theatre 6 years later.
	1874	Phèdre	Racine	title role	Comédie-Française	Same play but main role. 1874, 21 December
	1875	La Fille de Roland	Henri de Bornier	Berthe	Comédie-Française	1875, 15 February
	1875	Gabrielle	Emile Augier	title role	Comédie-Française	May
	1875	L'Oiseau bleu	Pierre Elzéar	Jeanne	Hôtel de Luynes	1875, 20 May
	1876	L'Étrangère	Alexandre Dumas fils	Mistress Clarkson	Comédie-Française	1876, 14 February
	1876	La Nuit de Mai	Alfred de Musset	Muse		
	1876	Rome vaincue	Alexandre Parodi	Posthumia	Comédie-Française	premiere 1876, 27 September
	1877	Hernani	Victor Hugo	Doña Sol	Comédie-Française	1877, 21 November
	1878	Othello	Shakespeare	Desdemona		
	1878	Amphytrion	Molière	Alcméne	Comédie-Française	
	1879	Mithridate	Racine	Monime		
	1879	Ruy Blas	Victor Hugo	La reine (Doña Maria de Neubourg, Queen of Spain)	Comédie-Française	Same role 7 years later in other theatre. 1879, 4 April
	1880	L'Aventurière	Emile Augier	Dona Clorinde		
	1880	Le Sphinx	Octave Feuillet	Blanche de Chelles		Same play 6 years later but other role.
	1880	Adrienne Lecouvreur	Eugene Scribe and Ernest Legouvé	title role		In USA: November 8, 1880, Booth's Theatre (NY)
	1880	Froufrou	Henri Meilhac and Ludovic Halévy	Gilberte		
	1880	La Dame aux Camélias	Alexandre Dumas fils	Marguerite Gautier		
	1881	La Princesse Georges	Alexandre Dumas fils	Sévérine		
	1882	Les Faux Ménages	Édouard Pailleron	Esther	Lyon	
	1882	La Dame aux Camélias	Alexandre Dumas fils	Marguerite Gautier	Théâtre de la Gaîté (Paris)	Same role 2 years later. 1882, 26 May
	1882	Fédora	Victorien Sardou	Fedora Romazoff	Vaudeville, Paris	Premiere 1882, 12 December
	1883	Pierrot Assassin	Jean Richepin	Pierrot	Palais du Trocadéro, Paris	1883, 28 April male role
	1883	Froufrou	Henri Meilhac and Ludovic Halévy	Gilberte	Théâtre Porte Sainte-Martin	Same play and role 3 years later. 1883, 17 September
	1883	Nana-Sahib	Jean Richepin	Djamma	Théâtre Porte Sainte-Martin	Premiere 1883, 20 December
	1884	Macbeth	Shakespeare, adaptation by Jean Richepin	Lady Macbeth	Théâtre Porte Sainte-Martin	1884, 21 May
	1884	Théodora	Victorien Sardou	title role	Théâtre Porte Sainte-Martin	Premiere 1884, 26 December
	1885	Marion De Lorme	Victor Hugo	title role	Théâtre Porte Sainte-Martin	1885, 30 December
	1886	La Tragique Histoire d'Hamlet, prince de Danemark	Shakespeare	Ophelia	Théâtre Porte Sainte-Martin	
	1886	La Maitre des Forges	Georges Ohnet	Claire de Beaulieu		premiere one act
	1886	L'Aveu	Sarah Bernhardt	Comtesse Marthe de Rocca		
	1887	La Tosca	Victorien Sardou	Floria Tosca	Théâtre de la Renaissance	Premiere 1887, 3 March
	1887	La Tosca	Victorien Sardou	Floria Tosca	Théâtre Porte Sainte-Martin	1887, 24 November
	1888	Francillon	Alexandre Dumas, fils	Francine de Riverolles	Lyceum, London	
	1889	Léna	Pierre Berton & F. C. Philipps	Léna Despart	Théâtres des Variétés, Paris	Premiere 1889, 16 April
	1890	Jeanne d'Arc	Jules Barbier, incidental music by Charles Gounod	title role	Théâtre Porte Sainte-Martin	1890, 3 January
	1890	Cléopâtre	Victorien Sardou and Émile Moreau	title role	Théâtre Porte Sainte-Martin	Premiere 1890, 23 October
	1890	La Passion	Edmond Haraucourt, music by J.S. Bach		Cirque d'Hiver, Paris	
	1891	Gringoie	Théodore de Banville	title role		
	1891	La Dame de Chalant	Giuseppe Giacosa	la Comtesse	Cincinnati	1891, 16 October
	1891	La Fille à Blanchard	Albert Darmont and Alfred Humblot	Pauline	Sydney (Australia)	1891, 25 July
	1892	Léah	Albert Darmont	title role	Boston	1892, 8 January
	1892	On ne badine pas avec l'amour (fr)	Alfred de Musset	Camille	New York	
	1892	Pauline Blanchard	Albert Darmont & Alfred Humbolt	title role	The Royal English Opera house, London	Year before as "La Fille à Blanchard". 1892, 16 June
CANCELED	1892	Salome	Oscar Wilde	title role	The Royal English Opera house, London	CANCELED
	1893	Les Rois	Jules Lemaitre	Princess Wilhelmine	Théâtre de la Renaissance	1893, 6 November
	1893	Phèdre	Racine	title role	Théâtre de la Renaissance	Same role in other theatre 19 years later. 1893, 19 November
	1894	Izéyl	Armand Silvestre and Eugène Morand	title role	Théâtre de la Renaissance	premiere 1894, 24 January In USA: 1896
	1894	Fédora	Victorien Sardou	Fedora Romazoff	Théâtre de la Renaissance	Same play and role 12 years later in other theatre. 1894, 3 April
	1894	Jean-Marie	André Theuriet	Thérése	Théâtre de la Renaissance	Same play and role 23 years later in other theatre. 1894, 9 Juny
	1894	La Femme de Claude	Alexandre Dumas fils	Césarine	Théâtre de la Renaissance	
	1894	Gismonda	Victorien Sardou	Gismonda, duchesse d'Athène	Théâtre de la Renaissance	Premiere 1894, 31 October
	1895	Magda	Hermann Sudermann	title role	Théâtre de la Renaissance	
	1895	La Princesse Lointaine	Edmond Rostand	Mélissinde, princesse d'Orient, comtesse de Tripoli	Théâtre de la Renaissance	Premiere 1895, 5 April
	1896	La Dame aux Camélias	Alexandre Dumas fils	Marguerite Gautier	Théâtre de la Renaissance	Same role 14 years later in other theatre. 1896, 30 September
	1896	Lorenzaccio	Alfred de Musset	title role	Théâtre de la Renaissance	Premiere 1896, 30 December male role
	1897	Spiritisme	Victorien Sardou	Simone	Théâtre de la Renaissance	Premiere 1897, 8 February
	1897	La Samaritaine (fr)	Edmond Rostand	Photine	Théâtre de la Renaissance	1897, 14 April
	1897	Les Mauvais Bergers	Octave Mirbeau	Madeleine	Théâtre de la Renaissance	
	1898	La Ville Morte (it)	Gabriele d'Annunzio	Anne	Théâtre de la Renaissance	Premiere 1898, 21 January
	1898	Lysiane	Romain Coolus	Lysiane de La Lauraye	Théâtre de la Renaissance	Premiere 1898, 20 April
	1898	Médée	Catulle Mendès	title role	Théâtre de la Renaissance	1898, 28 October
	1898	Phèdre	Racine	title role	Théâtre de la Renaissance	Reprise 5 years later. 1898, 20 November
	1899	Dalila	Octave Feuillet	Leonora, Princess Falconieri	Théâtre Sarah Bernhardt, Paris	Same play and rol2 26 years later in own theatre. 1899, 8 March
	1899	La Dame aux Camélias	Alexandre Dumas fils	Marguerite Gautier	Théâtre Sarah Bernhardt	Same role 3 years later in own theatre. 1899, 9 April
	1899	La Tragique Histoire d'Hamlet, prince de Danemark	Shakespeare, adapted by Marcel Schwob and Eugene Morand	title role	Théâtre Sarah Bernhardt	Same play 13 years later, other role. Male role In USA: 1900 Filmed scenes: Hamlet (1900).
	1899	La Tosca	Victorien Sardou	Floria Tosca	Théâtre Sarah Bernhardt	Same play and role 12 years later in own theatre. 1899, 21 January
	1900	L'Aiglon	Edmond Rostand	Duc de Reichstadt	Théâtre Sarah Bernhardt	Premiere 1900, 15 March Male role In USA: 1900, November 26
	1900	L'Etincelle	Édouard Pailleron	Léonie de Rénat	Théâtre Sarah Bernhardt	
	1900	Cyrano de Bergerac	Edmond Rostand	Roxane	New York	Nov 26, 1900, Garden Theatre
	1901	La Pluie et le beau Temps	Léon Gozlan	Baroness		
	1901	Les Precieuses Ridicules	Molière	Madelon		
	1902	Théodora	Victorien Sardou	title role	Théâtre Sarah Bernhardt	Same role 18 years later in own theatre. 1902, 7 January
	1902	Phèdre	Racine	title role	Théâtre Sarah Bernhardt	Same role 4 years later in own theatre. 1902, 6 February
	1902	Magda	Hermann Sudermann	title role	Théâtre Sarah Bernhardt	Same role 7 years later in own theatre. 1902, 20 February
	1902	Jean-Marie	André Theuriet	Thérése	Théâtre Sarah Bernhardt	Same play and role 8 years later in own theatre. 1902, 6 March
	1902	La Samaritaine	Edmond Rostand	Photine	Théâtre Sarah Bernhardt	Same play and role 5 years later in own theatre. 1902, 20 March
	1902	La Dame aux Camélias	Alexandre Dumas fils	Marguerite Gautier	Théâtre Sarah Bernhardt	Reprise 3 years later. 1902, 7 June
	1902	Francesca da Rimini	Francis Marion Crawford, trad. by Marcel Schwob	title role	Théâtre Sarah Bernhardt	1902, 22 April
	1902	Sapho	Alphonse Daudet	Fanny Legrand		
	1902	Théroigne de Méricourt (fr)	Paul Hervieu	title role	Théâtre Sarah Bernhardt	1902, 23 December
	1902	Fédora	Victorien Sardou	Fedora Romazoff	Théâtre Sarah Bernhardt	Same play and role 8 years later in own theatre. 1902, 19 November
	1903	Andromaque	Racine	role of Hermione, then the role of Andromaque	Théâtre Sarah Bernhardt	Same play 30 years later. 1903, 7 February
	1903	La Dame aux Camélias	Alexandre Dumas fils	Marguerite Gautier	Théâtre Sarah Bernhardt	Reprise 1 year later. 1903, 10 February. Filmed in 1911.
	1903	La Samaritaine	Edmond Rostand	Photine	Théâtre Sarah Bernhardt	Reprise 1 year later. 1903, 25 February
	1903	Circé	Charles Richet, music by Raoul Brunel	title role	Monte-Carlo	
	1903	Bohèmos	Miguel Zamacoïs		Monte-Carlo	
	1903	Werther	Goethe, adaptation by Pierre Decourcelle	title role	Théâtre Sarah Bernhardt	Premiere 1903, 6 March Male role
	1903	Plus que Reine	Emile de Bergerat	Joséphine de Beauharnais	Théâtre Sarah Bernhardt	
	1903	La Légende du Coeur	Jean Aicard	Cabestaing, troubadour	Théâtre antique d'Orange	1903, 13 July Male role
	1903	Jeanne Wedekind	Félix Philippi, adaptation by Luigi Krauss	title role	Théâtre Sarah Bernhardt	premiere 1903, 5 November
	1903	La Tosca	Victorien Sardou	Floria Tosca	Théâtre Sarah Bernhardt	Reprise 4 years later. 1903, 11 November Filmed in 1908.
	1903	La Sorcière	Victorien Sardou	Zoraya	Théâtre Sarah Bernhardt	premiere 1903, 15 December
	1904	Le Festin de la Mort	Antoine de Castellane	Mme. Maujourdain	Théâtre Sarah Bernhardt	premiere 1904, 14 January
	1904	Varennes	Henri Lavedan and Georges LeNôtre	Marie Antoinette	Théâtre Sarah Bernhardt	premiere
	1905	Angelo, tyran de Padoue	Victor Hugo	La Tisbé	Théâtre Sarah Bernhardt	1905, 7 February
	1905	Esther	Racine	Le roi Assuérus	Théâtre Sarah Bernhardt	1905, 8 April male role
	1905	Pelléas et Mélisande	Maurice Maeterlinck	Pelléas	Vaudeville Theatre (London)	1902, 2 July male role
	1905	Adrienne Lecouvreur	Eugene Scribe and Ernest Legouvé, adapted by Sarah Bernhardt	title role		Same play 25 years later, with new version of text made by Sarah herself
	1906	La Vierge d'Avila	Catulle Mendès	soeur Theresa	Théâtre Sarah Bernhardt	1906, 10 November
	1907	Les Bouffons	Miguel Zamacoïs	René dit Jacasse	Théâtre Sarah Bernhardt	1907, January 25 Male role
	1907	Adrienne Lecouvreur	Eugene Scribe and Ernest Legouvé, adapted by Sarah Bernhardt	title role	Théâtre Sarah Bernhardt	Reprise 2 years later. 1907, 7 April Filmed in 1912
	1907	Le Vert-Galant	Émile Moreau	La Reine Margot	Théâtre Sarah Bernhardt	
	1907	Le Réveil (fr)	Paul Hervieu	Thérèze de Mégée	Théâtre - Français, London	
	1907	La Belle au Bois Dormant	Jean Richepin and Henri Cain	Le poète Landry, le prince Landry (Prince Charmant)	Théâtre Sarah Bernhardt	1907, 24 December Male role
	1908	Le Courtisane de Corinthe	Paul Bilhaud and Michel Carré	Cléonice	Théâtre Sarah Bernhardt	premiere 1908, 8 April
	1908	La Passé	Georges de Porto-Riche	Dominique Brienne	Théâtre Sarah Bernhardt	
	1909	La Nuit de Mai	Alfred de Musset	Poet	Comédie Française	Same play 33 year later, but other role. 1909, 5 May Male role
	1909	Cyrano de Bergerac	Edmond Rostand	title role		(scenes from) Same play 9 years later but other role. Male role
	1909	La Fille de Rubenstein (??)	Remon (??)		Théâtre Sarah Bernhardt	
	1909	Le Procès de Jeanne d'Arc	Émile Moreau	Jeanne d'Arc	Théâtre Sarah Bernhardt	premiere 1909, 25 November In USA: 1910
	1909	La Tosca	Victorien Sardou	Floria Tosca	Théâtre Sarah Bernhardt	Reprise 6 years later. 1909, 8 May
	1910	La Beffa	Book by Sem Benelli; adapted by Jean Richepin	Gianetto Malespini	Théâtre Sarah Bernhardt	1910, 2 March Male role In USA: December 1910
	1910	La Femme X	Alexandre Bisson	Jacqueline Fleuriot	Théâtre Sarah Bernhardt	In USA: December 1910
	1910	Judas	John Wesley De Kay	title role	The Globe Theatre, New York	Male role Premiere in USA: Dec 24, 1910
	?	Soeur Béatrice (Sister Beatrice)	Maurice Maeterlinck			In USA: 1911
	1911	Lucrèce Borgia	Victor Hugo	title role	Théâtre Sarah Bernhardt	1911, 23 November
	1911	Tartuffe	Molière	Dorine	Théâtre Sarah Bernhardt	
	1912	La Reine Elizabeth	Emlie Moreau	title role	Théâtre Sarah Bernhardt	Premiere. 1912, 11 April Filmed: Les Amours de la reine Élisabeth (1912)
	1912	Une nuit de Noel sous la Terreur	Maurice Bernhardt and Henri Cain	Marion	Théâtre Sarah Bernhardt	Premiere 1912, 21 November
	1912	La Dame aux camélias	Alexandre Dumas fils	Marguerite Gautier	Théâtre Nouveau de Belleville (Paris)	Reprise 9 years later. 1912, 11 September
	1913	Jeanne Doré (fr)	Tristan Bernard	title role	Théâtre Sarah Bernhardt	Premiere 1913, 16 December Filmed in 1916
	1914	Tout à coup	Paul de Cassagnac and Guy de Cassagnac	La Marquise de Chalonne	Théâtre Sarah Bernhardt	Premiere 1914, 15 April
	1915	Les Cathédrales	Eugène Morand	La Cathédrale de Strasbourg	Théâtre Sarah Bernhardt	one act - premiere 1915, 7 November
	1916	La Mort de Cléopâtre	Maurice Bernhardt and Henri Cain	Cléopâtre		one act - premiere In USA: 1917
	1916	L'Holocauste	Sarah Bernhardt	Duchesse		one act - premiere
	1916	Du théâtre au Champ d'Honneur	Maurice Bernhardt and Henri Cain	soldier Marc Bertrand		Male role In USA: 1917
	1916	Vitrail	René Fauchois	Violaine	L'Alhambra (Paris)	one act 1914, 4 March In USA: 1917
	1916	Hécube	Maurice Bernhardt and Rene Clarance	title role		one act In USA: 1917
	1916	Le Faux Modèle	Edouard Daurelly	Madeleine		one act In USA: 1917
	1916	Le Marchand de Venise (The Merchant of Venice)	Shakespeare	Portia		excerpts from play In USA: "Shylock" (scenes) in 1917
	1916	L'Etoile dans la nuit	Henri Cain	Jane de Mauduit		one act
	1916	Les Amours de la reine Élisabeth	Émile Moreau	Queen Elizabeth		
	?	Cendres D'Opium	Jean De Le Traz			In USA: 1917
	?	La Chance du Mari	Gaston Armand De Caillavet and Robert de Flers			In USA: 1917
	?	Rosalie	Max Maurey			In USA: 1917
	?	La Paix Chez Soi (fr)	Georges Courteline			In USA: 1917
	?	L'Anglais tel Qu'on le Parle (fr)	Tristan Bernard			In USA: 1917
	1920	Rossini	René Fauchois	Anna, la mère du compositeur (Rossini's mother)	Théâtre des Célestins, Lyon	1920, 27 January
	1920	Athalie	Racine	title role	Théâtre Sarah Bernhardt	Same play 53 years later, other role. 1920, 1 April
	1920	Daniel	Louis Vernouil	Daniel Arnaud	Théâtre Sarah Bernhardt	Premiere. 1910, 10 November Filmed in 1921
	1920	Comment on écrit l'Histoire	Sacha Guitry	Mariette	Théâtre Sarah Bernhardt	one act-premiere 1920? December 4
	1921	La Gloire	Maurice Rostand	title role	Théâtre Sarah Bernhardt	one act-premiere 1921, October 19
	1921	Régine Armand	Louis Vernouil	title role	Théâtre Sarah Bernhardt	1921, April 20
	1922	La Mort de Molière, poème dramatique en un acte par Maurice Rostand, représenté au Théatre Sarah Bernhardt a l'occasion du tricentenaire de Molière	Maurice Rostand	La Douleur	Théâtre Sarah Bernhardt	in January of February one act

== Filmography ==
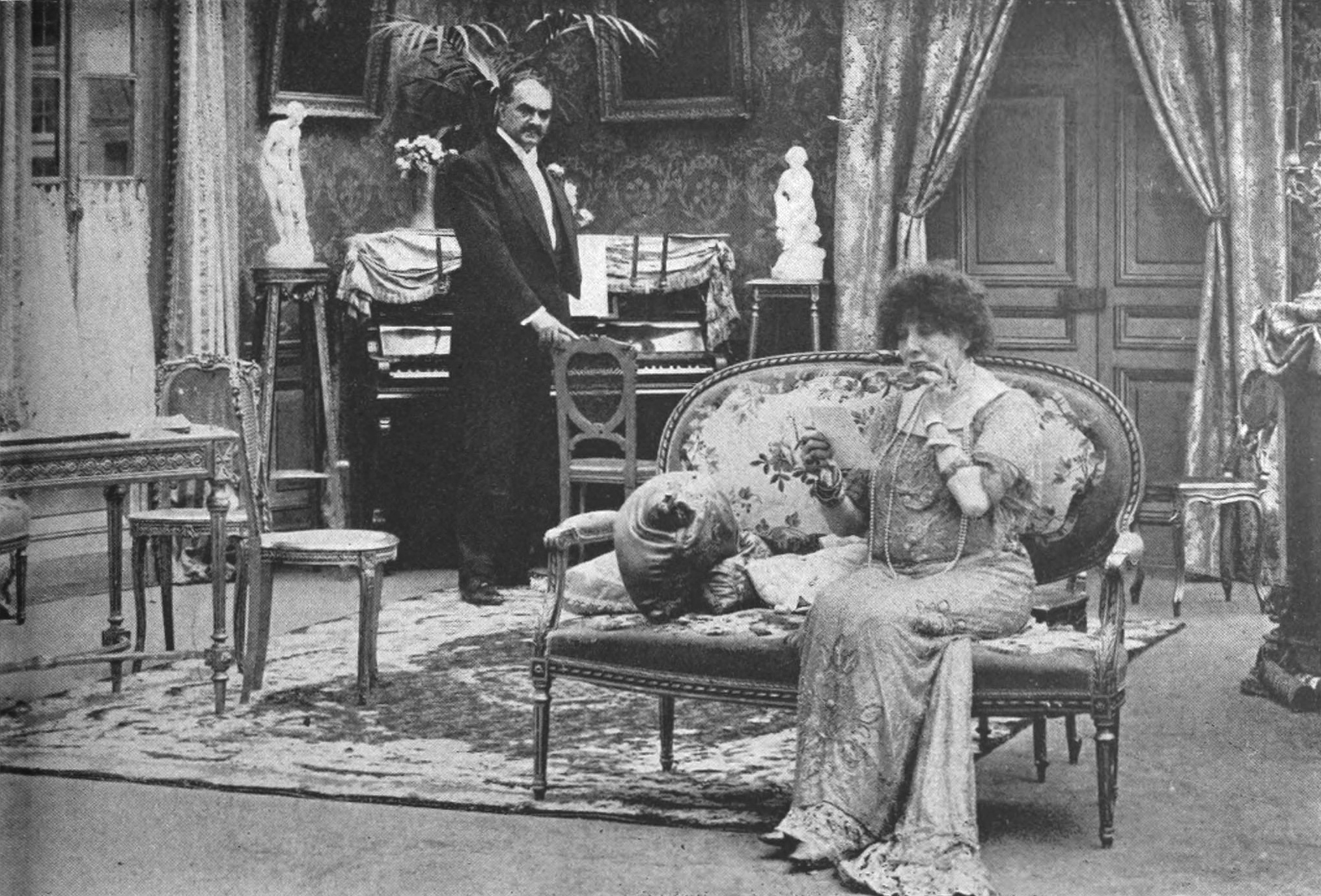
Bernhardt in the 1911 film adaptation of La Dame aux Camélias

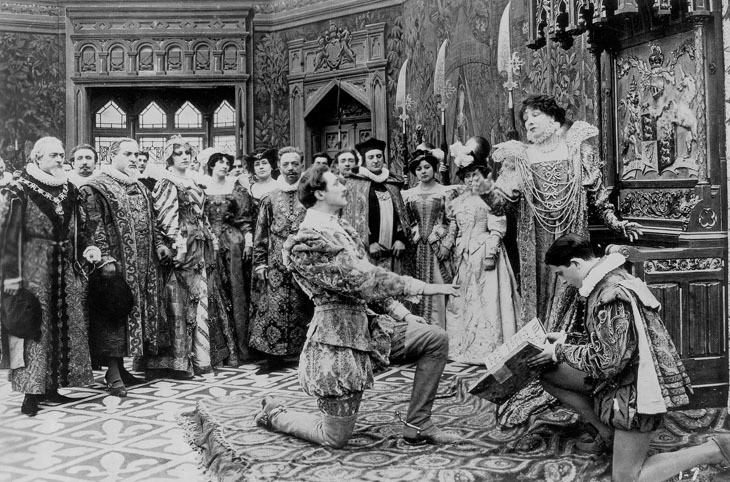
Scene from Les Amours de la reine Élisabeth (1912)

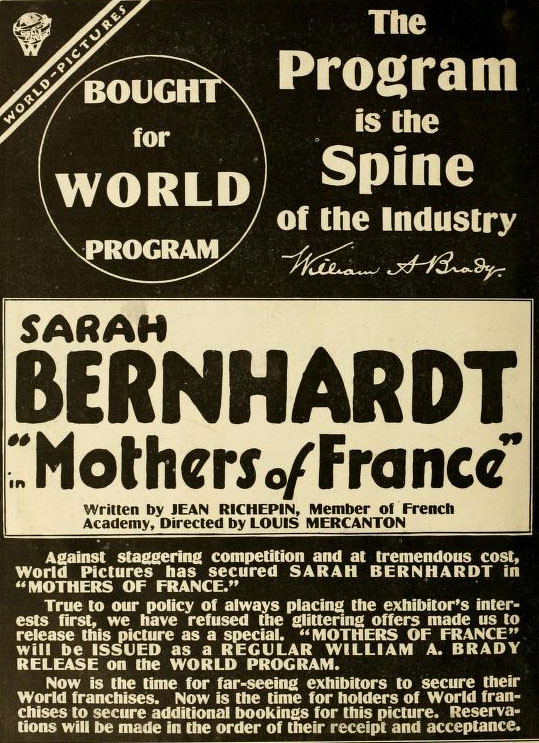
Advertisement for the 1917 U.S. release of Mothers of France

- 1900: Le Duel d'Hamlet (Hamlet, as Hamlet) An excerpt from the play, featuring Bernhardt in a duel to the death with Laertes.
- 1908: La Tosca (Tosca, as Tosca) A one-reel condensation of the play by the same name by Victorien Sardou.
- 1911: La Dame aux Camélias (Lady of the Camelias – Camille, in the U.S. release, as Camille) A two-reel condensation of the play by the same name, and co-starring Lou Tellegen.
- 1912: Adrienne Lecouvreur (An Actress's Romance; as Adrienne Lecouvreur) A two-reel condensation of the play by the same name. Co-starring Lou Tellegen.
- 1912: Les Amours d'Elisabeth, Reine d'Angleterre (Queen Elizabeth; a major success) A four-reel condensation of the play of the same name. Co-starring Lou Tellegen.
- 1912: Sarah Bernhardt à Belle-Isle (Sarah Bernhardt at Home, as herself) This documentary features Sarah at home with her family and friends, fishing for shrimp, and cuddling indoors with her pet dogs.
- 1915: Ceux de Chez Nous (Those at Home: biographical, home movies) By Sacha Guitry; among other celebrated persons of the era, there is a brief scene featuring Sarah sitting on a park bench with Sacha, and reading from a poem given to her by her granddaughter Lysiane.
- 1916: Jeanne Doré (as Jeanne Doré). Based on a play of the same name. Bernhardt appears as a widowed mother, who lavishes attention on her son, Jacques. When he is seduced by a temptress and accidentally murders a man, she visits him in his cell on the night before his execution, pretending to be his fiancée.
- 1917: Mères Françaises (Mothers of France), as Madame Jeanne D'Urbex, a war widow in World War I. When she learns that her son has also been wounded, she searches the battlefields, crawls through trenches, and finally reaches him at a medical station only to have him die in her arms. After this tragedy, she dedicates her life to helping others survive the ravages of war.
- 1921: Daniel (Pathé promotional film of the death scene from the play of the same name) Bernhardt appears as a morphine addict in the hour before death.
- 1923: La Voyante (The Fortune Teller) Bernhardt appears as a clairvoyant, who makes predictions that influence the outcome of national events. This film was Bernhardt's final performance, and was made while she was mortally ill. It was eventually completed with scenes made with Jeanne Brindeau, standing in for Bernhardt's character with her back turned to the camera.
