= Le prince troubadour =

Méhul in 1799 – portrait by Antoine Gros

Le prince troubadour, ou Le grand trompeur des dames (The Troubadour Prince, or The Great Deceiver of Ladies) is an opera by the French composer Étienne Méhul. It takes the form of an opéra comique in one act. It premiered at the Opéra-Comique, Paris on 24 May 1813. The libretto is by Alexandre Duval. The work was not a great success and only enjoyed 13 performances in 1813. According to Arthur Pougin, its failure contributed to Méhul's growing depression and his sense that he was the victim of a conspiracy by his enemies.

== Roles ==
Role	Voice type	Premiere Cast
Guillaume IX, Count of Poitou and Duke of Aquitaine	haute-contre	Paul Dutreck, called 'Paul'
Bérenger de Grand Manoir, Guillaume's troubadour	baritone	Jean-Blaise Martin
Baron de la Touraille	basse-taille (bass-baritone)	Mr. Darancourt
Mademoiselle Babolein de la Touraille, the baron's daughter	soprano	Marie Desbrosses
Laurette, the baron's grand-daughter and niece of Mademoiselle Babolein	soprano	Alexandrine-Marie-Agathe Ducamel, called Mme Gavaudan
The seneschal of the fiefdom of Touraille	basse taille	Mr. Juliet
Chorus: Squires vassals etc.

== Sources ==
- Printed score: Le Prince Troubadour//Opéra-comique en un Acte//Paroles//de Mr. Alexandre Duval//Membre de l'Institut//Musique//de Mr. Méhul//Membre de l'Institut, Paris, Frey, s.d. (accessible for free online at Gallica - B.N.F.
- Adélaïde de Place Étienne Nicolas Méhul (Bleu Nuit Éditeur, 2005)
- Arthur Pougin Méhul: sa vie, son génie, son caractère (Fischbacher, 1889)
- General introduction to Méhul's operas in the introduction to the edition of Stratonice by M. Elizabeth C. Bartlet (Pendragon Press, 1997)
