= Charlotte Aïssé =

French letter writer (c. 1694 – 1733)

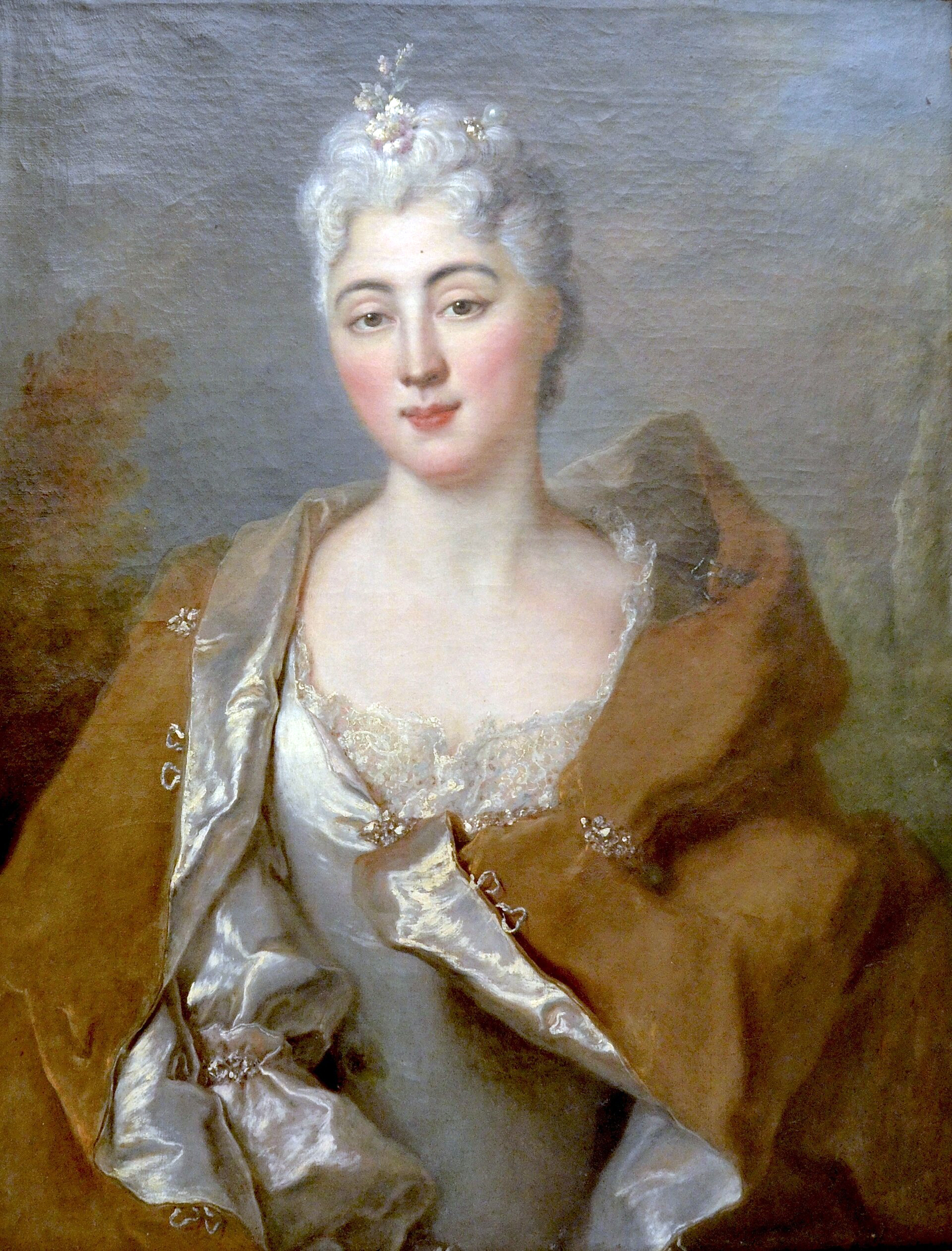
- Portrait inscribed ″Ayce″ on the reverse, c. 1720, attributed to Nicolas de Largillière
- Born: c. 1694; Circassia
- Died: March 13, 1733; Paris
- Partner: Blaise-Marie d'Aydie
- Children: a daughter

Charlotte Aïssé (a corruption of Haïdé; c. 1694 – 13 March 1733) was a French letter-writer and the daughter of a Circassian prince.

== Life ==
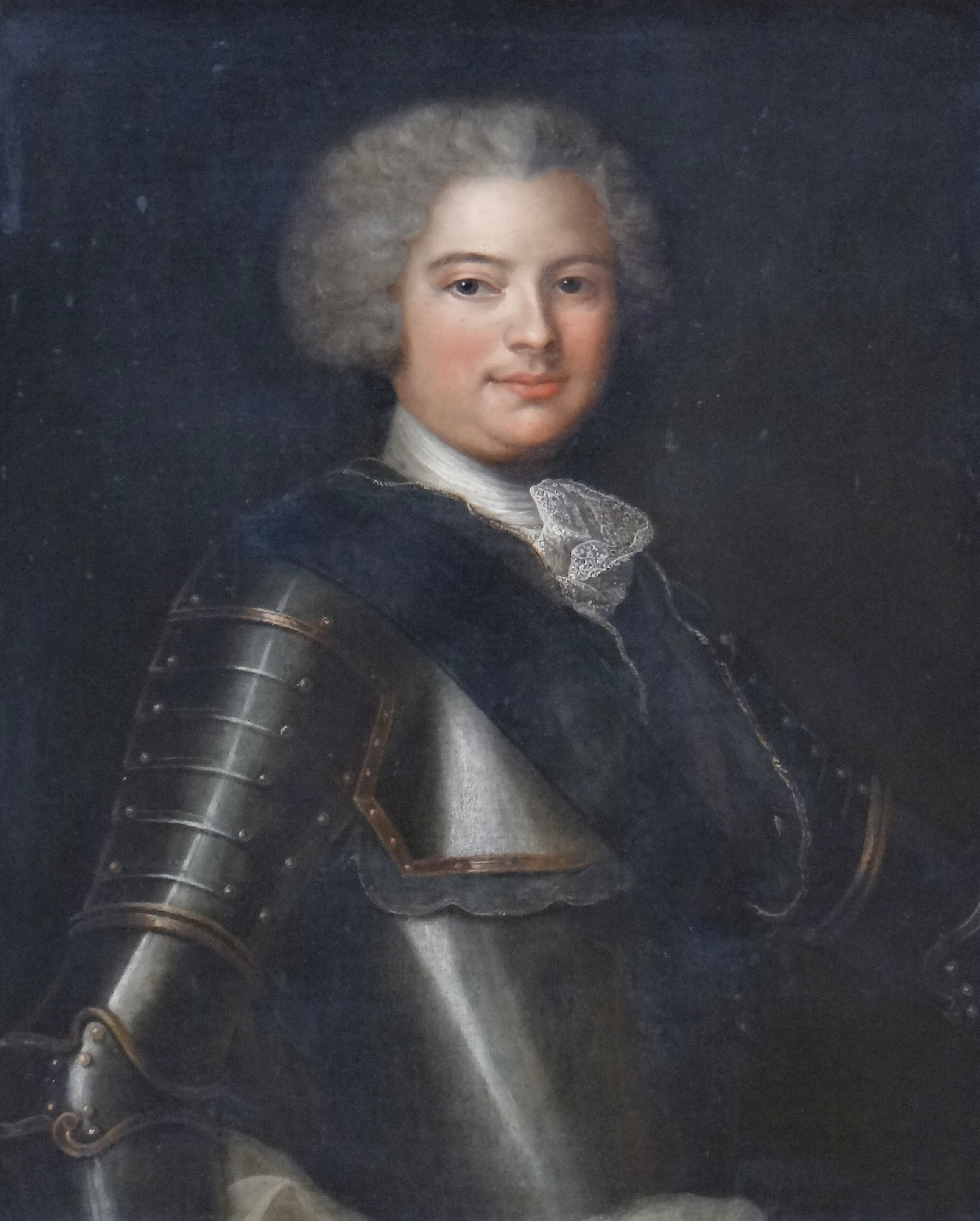
Portrait of the chevalier Blaise-Marie d'Aydie, c. 1785

Her father's palace was pillaged by the Turks, and as a child of four years old she was sold to the comte Charles de Ferriol, the French ambassador at Constantinople (see Crimean slave trade). She was brought up in Paris by Ferriol's sister-in-law, Marie-Angélique de Tencin, with her own sons, Antoine de Ferriol de Pont-de-Veyle (1697–1774) and d'Argental (1700–1788). Her great beauty and romantic history made her the fashion, and she attracted the notice of the regent, Philip II, Duke of Orléans, whose offers she had the strength of mind to refuse. She formed a deep and lasting attachment to Blaise-Marie d'Aydie (1692–1761), a knight of Malta, by whom she had a daughter. She died in Paris.

== Lettres de Mademoiselle Aïssé à Madame C… ==
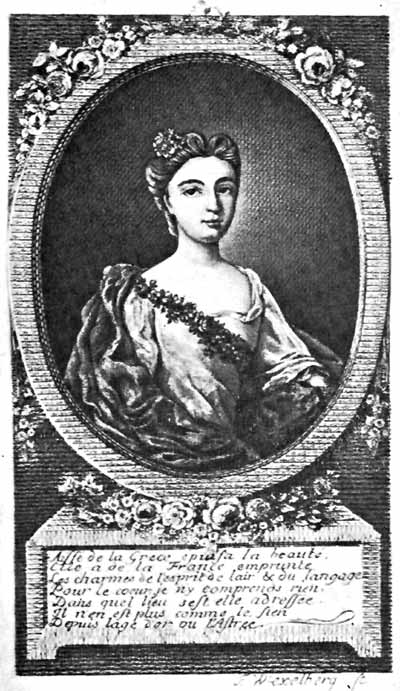
Portrait engraved by F. Wexelberg. It served as the frontispiece of the second edition of the Lettres de Mademoiselle Aïssé (Lausanne, 1788).

Her letters to her friend Julie Calandrini (née de Pelissari; 1668–1754), were first published with notes attributed to Voltaire (1787). They were republished the following year and throughout the 19th century. Their recipient was not correctly identified until the 1806 edition.

Letter VII, dated Paris, 1727, was adapted by Leonora Blanche Alleyne as The Man in White and illustrated by Henry Justice Ford in The Red True Story Book (1895).

It has been argued that the letters were heavily rewritten before their posthumous publication, based on stylistic differences with rare surviving manuscripts.

== Mlle Aïssé in fiction ==
Mlle Aïssé may have inspired Abbé Prévost's Histoire d'une Grecque moderne (1740) and Claire de Duras's Ourika (1823).

She was the subject of three plays:

- 1854: Mademoiselle Aïssé, a play in 5 acts, in prose, by Alexandre de Lavergne and Paul Foucher
- 1871: Mademoiselle Aïssé, a play in 4 acts, in verse, by Louis Bouilhet, in which her character was played by Sarah Bernhardt
- 1898: Aïssé, comedy in 5 acts, in verse, by Louis Lautrey under the pen name François Dejoux

She was also the inspiration for Rosa Campbell Praed's historical novel, The Romance of Mademoiselle Aïssé (1910).

== Bibliography ==
- Amelia Gere Mason, The Women of the French Salons (1891), ch.11.
- Edmund Gosse, French Profiles (1905), p. 35-67.
- Evangeline Wilbour Blashfield, Portraits and Backgrounds: Hrotsvitha, Aphra Behn, Aïssé, Rosalba Carriera (1917).
- J. Christopher Herold, Love in five temperaments (1961).
- Amy J. Ransom, ″Mademoiselle Aïssé: inspiration for Claire de Duras's Ourika?″, Romance Quarterly 46:2 (1999), p. 84-98.
- Valerie Lastinger, ″Charlotte Elisabeth Aïssé″, in Writings by pre-revolutionary French women, ed. Anne R. Larsen and Colette H. Winn (1999) vol.2, p. 543–58.
