= Les deux aveugles de Tolède =

Opera by Étienne Méhul

Méhul in 1799 – portrait by Antoine Gros

Les deux aveugles de Tolède (The Two Blind Men of Toledo) is an opéra comique in one act by the French composer Étienne Méhul. It premiered at the Opéra-Comique, Paris on 28 January 1806. The libretto, by Benoît-Joseph Marsollier, is a revision of the same author's Les deux aveugles de Bagdad, set by A.J. Fournier in 1782.

Contemporary reviewers praised Méhul's music while criticising the weakness of the libretto. The opera only enjoyed limited success, with 19 performances in 1806, plus one on 28 October 1809 and a final one on 22 May 1810. The overture provides local Spanish colour through the use of a bolero rhythm (in the older Spanish sense).

== Roles ==
Role	Voice type	Premiere Cast
Nuguez, a blind musician, uncle of Flora	basse-taille (bass-baritone)	Simon Chénard
Don Brusco, another blind musician, engaged to Flora	baritone	Jean-Pierre Solié
Mendoce, who goes under the assumed name of Pedro; he is Flora's lover, pretending to be a pupil of the blind musicians	baritone	Jean-Blaise Martin
Flora, Nuguez's niece	soprano	Madame Gavaudan
Jacinthe, the blind men's housekeeper	soprano	Marie Desbrosses

== Recordings ==
The overture appears on: Méhul Overtures, Orchestre de Bretagne, conducted by Stefan Sanderling (ASV, 2002).

== Sources ==
- Adélaïde de Place Étienne Nicolas Méhul (Bleu Nuit Éditeur, 2005)
- Arthur Pougin Méhul: sa vie, son génie, son caractère (Fischbacher, 1889)
- General introduction to Méhul's operas in the introduction to the edition of Stratonice by M. Elizabeth C. Bartlet (Pendragon Press, 1997)
- Ates Orga: booklet notes to the Sanderling recording
