= Nostalgie de la boue =

Attraction to low-life culture, experience, and degradation

Nostalgie de la boue (English: "nostalgia for mud") is a French phrase meaning the attraction to low-life culture, experience, and degradation, found at times both in individuals and in cultural movements.

The phrase was coined in 1855 by Émile Augier, who used it in his play Le Mariage d'Olympe. The art historian Rosalind E. Krauss would observe that, peculiarly, the phrase is not seen in the Francophone world but instead only in the Anglophone world.

== Psychological underpinnings ==
Marion Woodman the Jungian considered that a break or katabasis from the normal social world could leave the protagonist trapped by "a yearning for what I call pig consciousness—wallowing in mud and loving it".

Helen Vendler considered that something of the kind happened to Seamus Heaney when, after a venture in abstraction, he recoiled to ground himself in a material world of mud and dirt.

== Examples ==
=== Classical ===
- Tacitus records the emperor Nero's liking for roaming the streets of his capital in a slave disguise, stealing and assaulting passers-by in the company of his friends.
- Petronius highlights the kind of Roman lady who "looks for something to love among the lowest of the low...heated up over the absolute dregs".

=== Modern ===
- The 1890s were notable for a mix of high culture and low experience, as seen in figures like Joris-Karl Huysmans.
- The youthful Bob Dylan would claim that "The only beauty's ugly, man...the hard filthy gutter sound".
- Jonathan Ames described himself as drawn to prostitutes and the gutter by nostalgie de la boue.
- Tom Wolfe described a party in New York in 1970: "It was at this party that a Black Panther field marshal rose up beside the north piano—there was also a south piano—in Leonard Bernstein’s living room and outlined the Panthers’ ten-point program to a roomful of socialites and celebrities, who, giddy with nostalgie de la boue, entertained a vision of the future in which, after the revolution, there would no longer be any such thing as a two-story, thirteen-room apartment on Park Avenue, with twin grand pianos in the living room, for one family.

== See also ==
- Circe
- Radical chic
- Repressive desublimation
- Slum tourism
