= Antoine Ponchard =

French opera singer

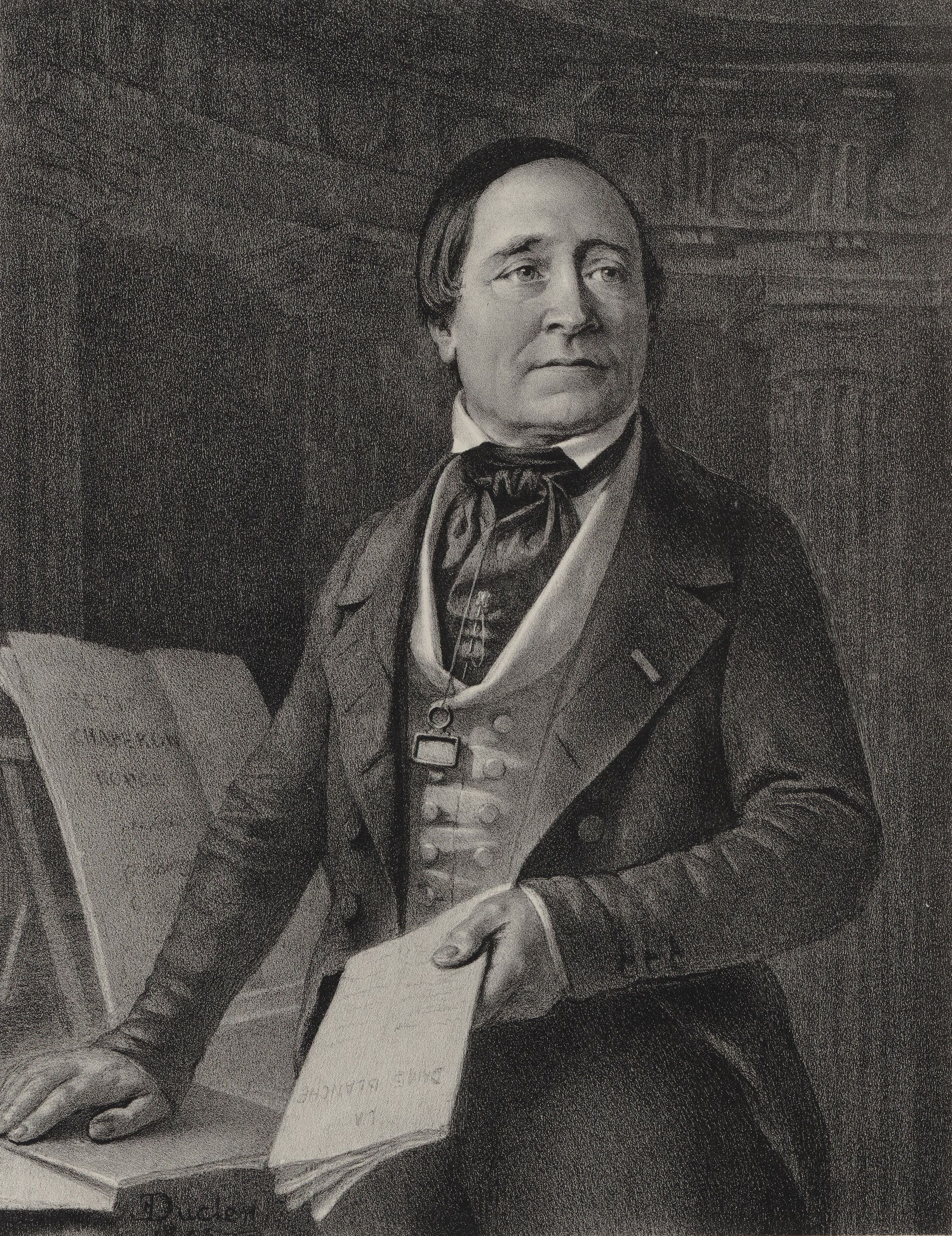
- Antoine Ponchard
- Born: Louis Antoine Ponchard; 31 August 1787; Paris
- Died: 6 June 1866 (aged 78); Paris
- Occupations: Singer; Teacher

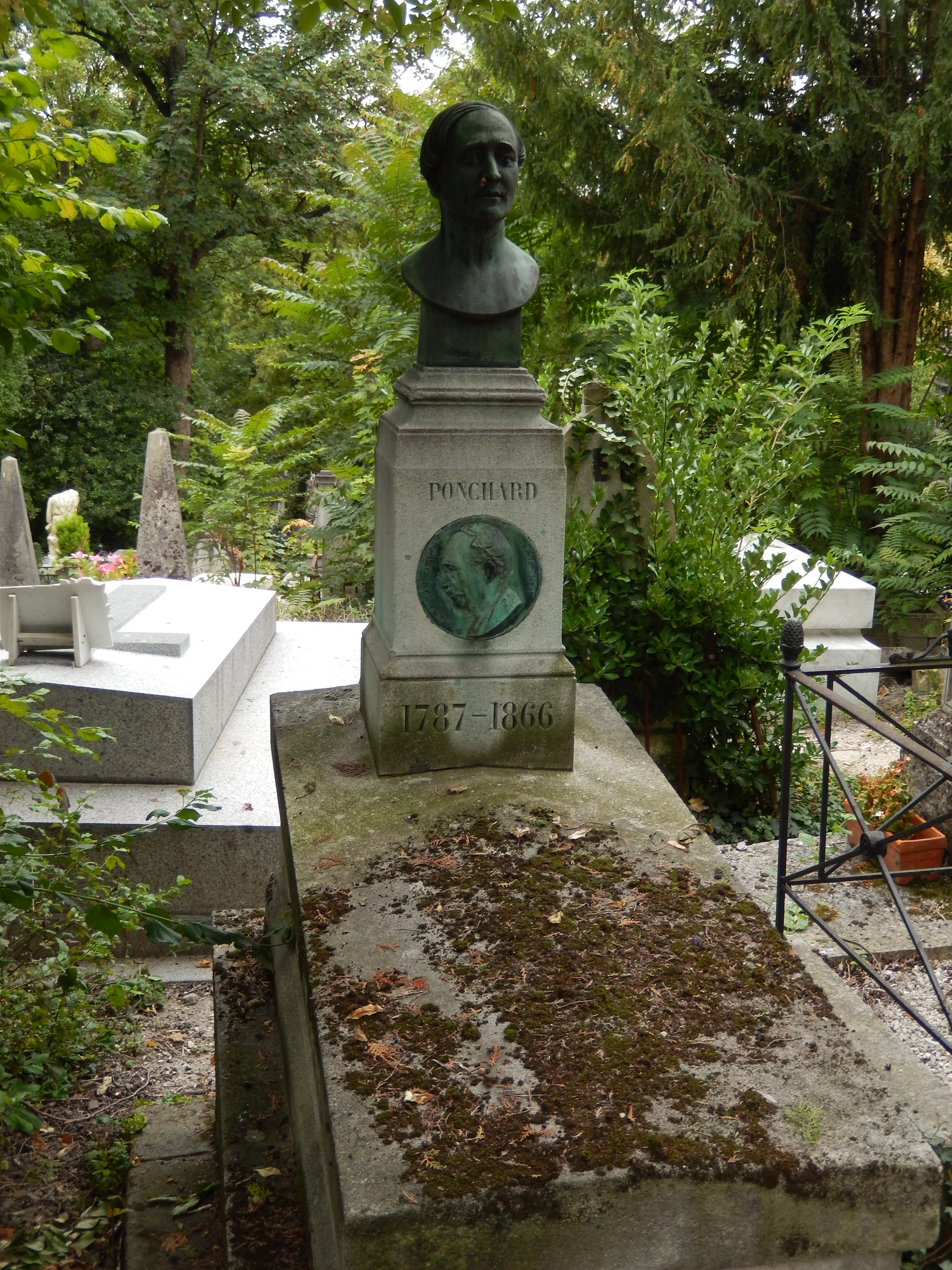
Louis Ponchard's grave (Père Lachaise cemetery, 11th division)

Louis Antoine Ponchard (31 August 1787 – 6 June 1866) was a 19th-century French operatic tenor and teacher.

He made his debut in 1812 in L'Ami de la maison, opera by Grétry. In 1825, he sang the leading role − George Brown − at the première of La dame blanche by Boïeldieu. He also participated in the premières of Boïeldieu's operas Petit Chaperon Rouge and Deux Nuits, Joconde ou Les coureurs d'aventures, by Nicolas Isouard, La muette de Portici by Michele Carafa, Zémire et Azor by Grétry as well as many operas by Auber such as Le maçon in 1825 and also La journée aux aventures by Étienne Méhul in 1816.

Ponchard taught singing at the Lille Conservatory where Henri-Bernard Dabadie, Jean-Baptiste Faure, Giovanni Mario, Louis-Henri Obin, Anaïs Fargueil, Rosine Stoltz, Jean-Baptiste Weckerlin, Gustave-Hippolyte Roger and Charles-Marie Ponchard were among his students.

Antoine Ponchard is buried at Père Lachaise cemetery (11th division).

== Sources ==
- A Dictionary of Opera and Song Themes, Sam Morgenstern & Harry Barlow, Crown Publishers, 1950
- François-Joseph Fétis, Biographie universelle des musiciens et bibliographie générale de la musique, Supplément, tome 2, Paris, Firmin-Didot, 1878-1880, (p. 358) gallica.bnf.fr.
