= Ernest Daudet =

French journalist, novelist and historian

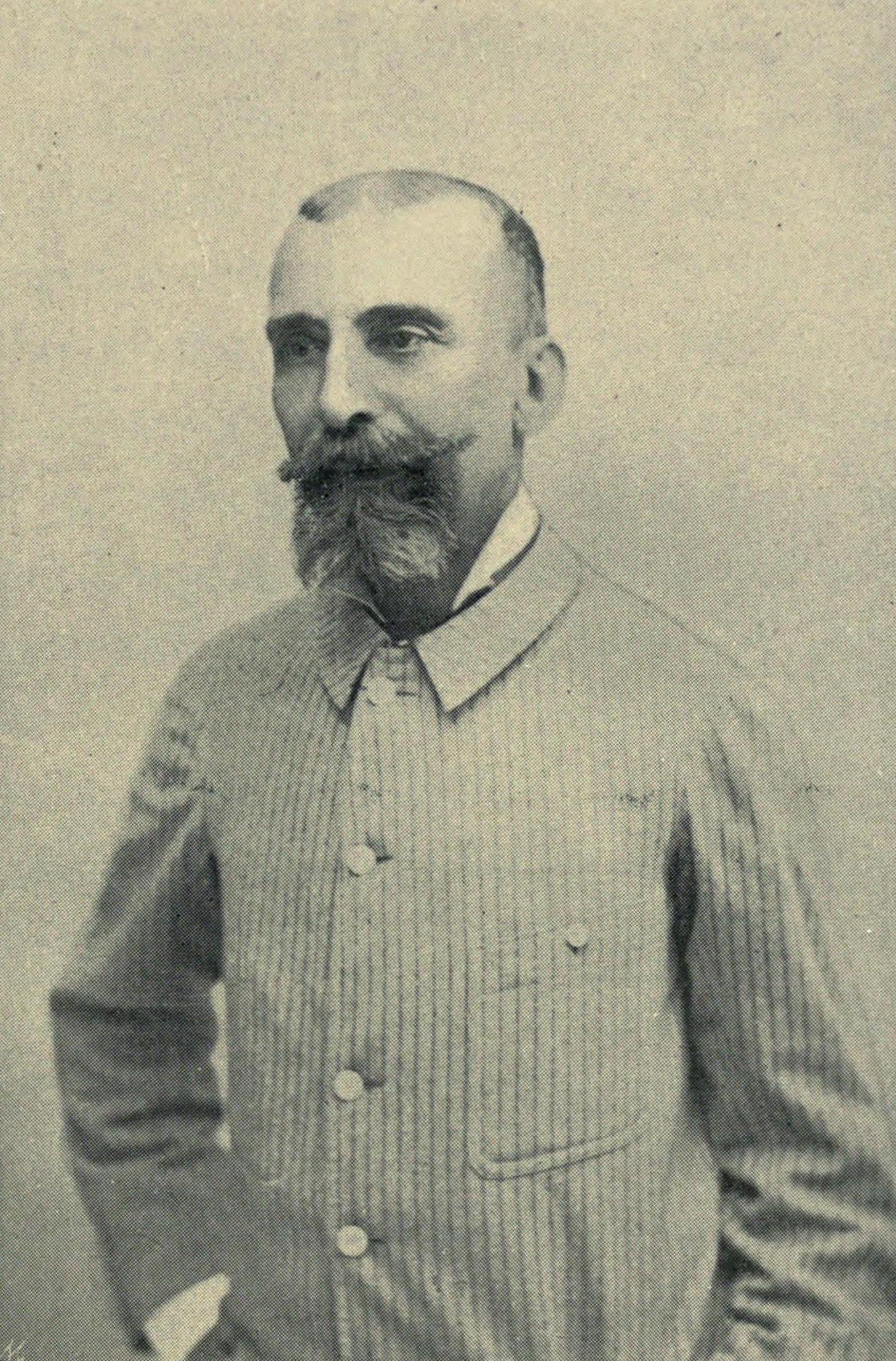
Ernest Daudet.

Louis-Marie Ernest Daudet (French: [ɛʁnɛst dodɛ]; 31 May 1837 – 21 August 1921) was a French journalist, novelist and historian. Prolific in several genres, Daudet began his career writing for magazines and provincial newspapers all over France. His younger brother was Alphonse Daudet.

== Biography ==
Ernest Daudet was born in Nîmes, an old Roman city of Languedoc, France. His father, Vincent Daudet, was a silk merchant whose lack of business sense eventually involved him in bankruptcy. His mother, Adeleine Reynaud, was descended from a respected Provençal family. In 1857 he went to Paris with his brother in order to gain a livelihood through literary pursuits. For a time he managed the Journaux Officiels and the Petit Moniteur. He was also the secretary-editor of the Legislative Corps and chief of the Cabinet of the Senate.

He died in Petites-Dalles in 1921, aged 84.

== Publications ==
Fiction

- Thérèse (1859).
- Les Duperies de l’Amour (1865).
- Les Douze Danseuses du Château de Lamôle. Une Liaison Littéraire. John Stewart. Frédéric et Julie (1867).
- La Succession Chavanet (2 vols., 1867).
- Marthe Varadès (1868).
- La Succession Chavanet (1868).
- Le Missionnaire (1869).
- Le Prince Pogoutzine (1869).
- Les Soixante-et-Une Victimes de la Glacière (1869).
- Le Roman d'une Jeune Fille (1869).
- Jean-le-Gueux (1870).
- Les Dames de Ribeaurpix (1872).
- Fleur de Péché (1872).
- Le Roman de Delphine (1873).
- Un Mariage Tragique (1873).
- Les Aventures de Raymond Rocheray (1875).
- La Vénus de Gordes (1875, with Adolphe Belot).
- La Petite Sœur (1875).
- La Baronne Amalti (1877).
- Le Crime de Jean Malory (1877).
- Daniel de Kerfons, Confession d'un Homme du Monde (2 vols., 1877).
- La Marquise de Sardes (1878).
- Clarisse (1879).
- L'Aventure de Jeanne (1879).
- Dolorès (1879).
- Madame Robernier (1879).
- La Maison de Graville (1880).
- Le Fils de ces Dames (1880).
- Les Amoureux de Juliette (1880).
- Les Aventures des Trois Jeunes Parisiennes (1880).
- Robert Darnetal (1880).
- Le Mari (1880).
- Le Lendemain du Pêché (1881).
- Mon Frère et Moi (1882).
- La Caissière (1882).
- Défroqué (1882).
- Pervertis (1882).
- La Carmélite (1883).
- Le Père de Salviette (1883).
- Zahra Marsy (1883).
- Mademoiselle Vestris, Histoire d'une Orpheline (1883).
- Aventures de Femmes (1885).
- Les Reins Cassés (1885).
- Gisèle Rubens (1887).
- Fils d'Émigrés (1890).
- Le Gendarme Excommunié; Cruautés de Femmes; Madeleine Bonafous (1891).
- À l'Entrée de la Vie (1892).
- Mademoiselle de Circé, Roman d'une Conspiration sous le Premier Empire, 1805-1806 (1893).
- Aveux de Femme (1894).
- La Vénitienne (1894).
- Un Amour de Barras. Nuit de Noces. Aventure d'Émigré. Représailles. Une Nuit de Noël. Une Matinée de Fouché. Le Roman d'un Complot (1895).
- Drapeaux Ennemis (1895).
- Doux Raphaël (1895).
- Les Fiançailles Tragiques (1896).
- Pauline Fossin (1897).
- Rolande et Andrée (1897).
- La Mongautier, Roman des Temps Révolutionnaires (1897).
- Fléau qui Passe (1900).
- Nini-la-Fauvette (1903).
- Expiatrice (1904).
- L'Espionne (1905).
- Une Idylle dans un Drame (1905).
- Poste Restante (1908).
- La Course à l'Abîme (1909).
- Les Rivaux, Roman en Époques, 1795-1815-1830 (1910).
- Le Mauvais Arbre sera Coupé (1910).
- Beau-Casque, Roman des Temps Révolutionnaires (1910)

Non-fiction

- Le Cardinal Consalvi (1866).
- L'Agonie de la Commune, Paris à Feu et à Sang (1871).
- Trois Mois d'Histoire Contemporaine. La Vérité sur l'Essai de Restauration Monarchique. Événements qui se sont Accomplis du 5 août au 5 novembre 1873 (1873).
- Le Ministère Martignac (1875).
- Le Procès des Ministères (1875).
- Les Grands Épisodes de la Monarchie Constitutionnelle (1877).
- Henriette, Fragments du journal du marquis de Boisguerny (1877).
- La Terreur Blanche (1878).
- Souvenirs de la Présidence du Maréchal de Mac-Mahon (1881).
- Histoire des Conspirations Royalistes du Midi sous la Révolution (1790-1793) (1881).
- Histoire de la Restauration (1882).
- Histoire de l'Émigration: Les Bourbons et la Russie pendant la Révolution Française (1886).
- Histoire de l'Émigration: Les Émigrés et la Seconde Coalition, 1797-1800 (1886).
- Mémoires du Temps de Louis XIV (1889).
- La Police et les Chouans sous le Consulat et l’Empire, 1800-1815 (1895).
- Histoire Diplomatique de l'Alliance Franco-russe (1893).
- Les Coulisses de la Société Parisienne (2 vols., 1893).
- Le Duc d'Aumale, 1822-1897 (1898).
- Les Deux Évêques (1899).
- Louis XVIII et le duc Decazes, 1815-1820 (1899).
- La Conjuration de Pichegru et les Complots Royalistes du Midi et de l'Est, 1795-1797 (1901).
- Conspirateurs et Comédiennes, Épisodes d'Histoire d'Après des Documents Inédits, 1796-1825 (1902).
- Une Vie d'Ambassadrice au Siècle Dernier. La Princesse de Lieven (1903).
- Le Roman d'un Conventionnel. Hérault de Séchelles et les Dames de Bellegarde (1904).
- Histoire de l'Émigration pendant la Révolution Française (3 vols., 1904–1907).
- Au Temps de l'Empereur, Récits d'une Grand'mère (1907).
- Lettres du Cte Valentin Esterhazy à sa Femme (1907).
- Joseph de Maistre et Blacas, leur Correspondance Inédite et l'Histoire de leur Amitié, 1804-1820 (1908).
- L'Exil et la Mort du Général Moreau (1909).
- L'Ambassade du duc Decazes en Angleterre (1820-1821) (1910).
- À Travers Trois Siècles (1911).
- Les Complices des Auteurs de la Guerre. I. Ferdinand Ier, Tsar de Bulgarie (1912).
- La Chronique de nos Jours, Notes et Souvenirs pour Servir à l'Histoire (1912).
- Tragédies et Comédies de l'Histoire, Récits des Temps Révolutionnaires (1912).
- Madame Royale (1912).
- La Police Politique: Chronique des Temps de la Restauration (1912).
- Un Drame d'Amour à la Cour de Suède, 1784-1795 (1913).
- Vingt-cinq ans à Paris, 1826-1850. Journal du comte Rodolphe Apponyi (3 vols., 1913–1914).
- De la Terreur au Consulat, Récits Romanesques et Tragiques en Marge des Temps Révolutionnaires (1914).
- Journal de Victor de Balabine, Secrétaire de l'Ambassade de Russie: Paris de 1842 à 1852 (1914).
- Les Auteurs de la Guerre de 1914 (1916).
- La France et l'Allemagne après le Congrès de Berlin (2 vols., 1918–1919).
- Soixante Années du Règne des Romanov (1919)
- L'Avant-dernier Romanoff. Alexandre III (1920).
- Jeunes Filles d’Autrefois (1931).

Theater

- Marthe (1890).
- Un Drame Parisien (1892).
- La Citoyenne Cotillon (1904, with Henri Cain).

Miscellany

- Mon Frère et Moi, Souvenirs d'Enfance et de Jeunesse (1882).
- Mes Chroniques de 1915 et 1916, Pages d'Histoire en Marge de la Guerre (1917).
- Souvenirs de Mon Temps. I. Débuts d'un Homme de lettres. 1857-1861 (1921).

Works in English translation

- "Marshal de MacMahon," French Celebrities (1883).
- "Jules Simon," French Celebrities (1883).
- The Apostate (1893).
- "Du Barry's Adventure," The Parisian (1897).
- My Brother and I (1898).
- His Father's Wife (1908).
- Madame Royale, Daughter of Louis XVI and Marie Antoinette (1913).
- "France and Clemenceau," The Living Age (1917).
