= J. Christopher Herold =

Czech-American university press editor and author (1919–1964)

Jean Christopher Herold (11 May 1919 – 10 December 1964) was a Czech-American university press editor and author. While holding an editorship for Columbia University Press from 1946 to 1956, Herold edited Columbia Encyclopedia articles about European history. From 1956 to 1960, Herold was the editor of Stanford University Press.

As an author, Herold primarily wrote French history books on Napoleon Bonaparte while also covering Joan of Arc and Madame de Staël. He won the 1959 National Book Award for Nonfiction with Mistress to an Age: A Life of Madame de Staël and received a Guggenheim Fellowship in 1960. Herold was also given fellowships from the Royal Society of Literature and the Society of American Historians.

== Early life and education ==
Herold was born on 11 May 1919 in Brno, Czechoslovakia. For his post-secondary education, Herold attended the University of Geneva during the late 1930s and studied literature. After moving to New York in 1939, Herold went to Columbia University for a Bachelor of Science and a Master of Arts in the early 1940s.

== Career ==
After completing his studies, Herold was a member of the Military Intelligence Corps from 1942 to 1945. In 1946, Herold started a decade long editorship tenure with Columbia University Press. During this time period, Herold worked on European history articles for the Columbia Encyclopedia. Herold had "rewrote some 10 million articles" while holding the position of assistant editor.

In 1956, Herold was selected by Stanford University Press to become their editor. He held the position until his replacement was selected in 1960. Outside of editing, Herold wrote his first book, The Swiss Without Halos, in 1948 while at Columbia. From the 1950s to 1960s, Herold primarily wrote about Napoleon Bonaparte during his literary career in French history.

In 1952, Herold wrote a children's book about Joan of Arc with Joan, Maid of France while Frederick T. Chapman provided the drawings. After starting the work in 1953, Herold released his Madame de Stael biography in 1958. In 1961, Herold released a book about women who lived in France between the 17th to 19th centuries called Love in Five Temperaments. His publication focused on Madame de Tencin, Madame de Staal de Launay, Mademoiselle Aisse, Mademoiselle Clairon, and Julie de Lespinasse.

== Awards and honors ==
In 1958, Mistress to an Age: A Life of Madame de Staël received the gold medal for nonfiction as part of the California Book Awards. The following year, Mistress to an Age: A Life of Madame de Staël won the 1959 National Book Award for Nonfiction. The following year, he received a Guggenheim Fellowship in 1960 studying French literature. Additional fellowships Herold received were from the Royal Society of Literature and the Society of American Historians.

== Death and personal life ==
On 10 December 1964, Herold died at Columbia–Presbyterian Medical Center. He had one child and was previously married.
