= Édouard Devicque =

Édouard Devicque (1830 – 4 January 1863) was a 19th-century French playwright and novelist.

== Biography ==
After he had presented, in collaboration with Henri Crisafulli, his regular collaborator, a certain number of plays many of which enjoyed a great success, Devicque was better known as a playwright than as a novelist.

He made his debut in theatre in 1855 with the drama César Borgia, which offered the distinction of having been received, learned and mounted in eight days ; Of all his plays, the one was the most successful. Then came the historical drama Marie Stuart en Écosse, the popular drama Deux faubouriens, le Roi Lear, Giroflé-Girofla, a drama which, despite the emotional role that was created by Mme. Doche was little appreciated by the public. Finally, the comedy Esther Ramel, where Anaïs Fargueil played the lead role, was a miserable failure, and the play disappeared from the bills almost immediately after the premiere.

The complete failure of Esther Ramel, succeeding promising successes, probably discouraged Devicque from theater. It is from this time that, despairing of addressing popular theaters, he began writing novels.

When he died, he left many manuscripts to Henri Crisafulli.

== Theatre ==
- 1855: César Borgia, four-act drama, with Henri Crisafulli, Théâtre de l’Ambigu, 11 December
- 1856: Marie Stuart en Écosse, historical drama in five acts and 12 tableaux, with Henri Crisafulli, Cirque-Olympique
- 1856: La Mye du roy Louis le unziesme, one-act drama, with Édouard Cadol, Librairie théâtrale, Paris
- 1857 Les Deux Faubouriens, popular drama in five acts and 8 tableaux, with Henri Crisafulli, Cirque-Olympique
- 1858: Giroflé-Girofla, five-act drama, with Henri Crisafulli, Théâtre de la Gaîté
- 1858: Le Roi Lear, drama in five acts and 8 tableaux, Cirque-Olympique
- 1861: Esther Ramel, three-act comedy, with Henri Crisafulli, Théâtre du Vaudeville, 10 June.

== Novels ==
- 1861: Les Mères coupables, F. Sartorius, Paris, in-18 ;
- 1862: Le Fils de Jean-Jacques, L. Sartorius, Paris, in-18 ;
- 1863: Les Amours du Balafré, L. de Potter, Paris, 5 vol. in-8° ;
- 1863: Écoliers et bandits, drames du vieux quartier latin, L. de Potter, Paris, 4 vol. in-8°.

== Sources ==
- "Title unknown". L'Intermédiaire des chercheurs et curieux. Paris. 1908. p. 135..
