= La journée aux aventures =

Opera by Étienne Méhul

Méhul in 1799 – portrait by Antoine Gros

La journée aux aventures (The Day of Adventures) is an opera by the French composer Étienne Méhul. It takes the form of an opéra comique in three acts. It was first performed at the Opéra-Comique, Paris on 16 November 1816. The libretto is by Pierre-David-Augustin Chapelle and Louis Mezières-Miot. This was the last of the composer's works to be premiered in his lifetime and was a great success; it enjoyed 66 performances before the end of 1817 and helped remedy the financial problems of the Opéra-Comique. It was revived to acclaim in a German translation in Berlin in December 1839.

== Roles ==
Role	Voice type	Premiere Cast
Gercour, a captain of dragoons	haute-contre	Paul Dutreck called 'Paul'
Florval, his friend	haute-contre	Auguste Huet
Danville, an officer of the hussars, nephew of the Marquise de Gernance	haute-contre	Louis-Antoine-Eléonor Ponchard
Bertrand, a farmer	basse-taille (bass-baritone)	Mr. Darancourt
Antonin, a young peasant, a little simple and teasing	haute-contre	Mr. Moreau
The Marquise de Gernance	soprano	Mme Crétu
Madame de Surville, her niece	soprano	Marie Julie Boulanger
Germaine, a farmer's wife	soprano	Marie Desbrosses
Rosette, her daughter	soprano	Mme Gavaudan
François, the Marquise's intendant	spoken	Mr. Aler
Head guard of the château	basse-taille	Rolland
A valet	spoken	?
Chorus: Guards of the château, villagers

== Sources ==
- Printed score: La Journée aux Aventures//Opéra Comique en trois Actes et en Prose, Paroles de MM. Capelle et Mézières, Musique de Mr. Méhul..., Paris, Petit, s.d. (accessible for free online at the Internet Archive)
- Adélaïde de Place Étienne Nicolas Méhul (Bleu Nuit Éditeur, 2005)
- Arthur Pougin Méhul: sa vie, son génie, son caractère (Fischbacher, 1889)
- General introduction to Méhul's operas in the introduction to the edition of Stratonice by M. Elizabeth C. Bartlet (Pendragon Press, 1997)
