= La dame blanche =

Opéra comique by François-Adrien Boieldieu

- Opéra comique by François-Adrien Boieldieu
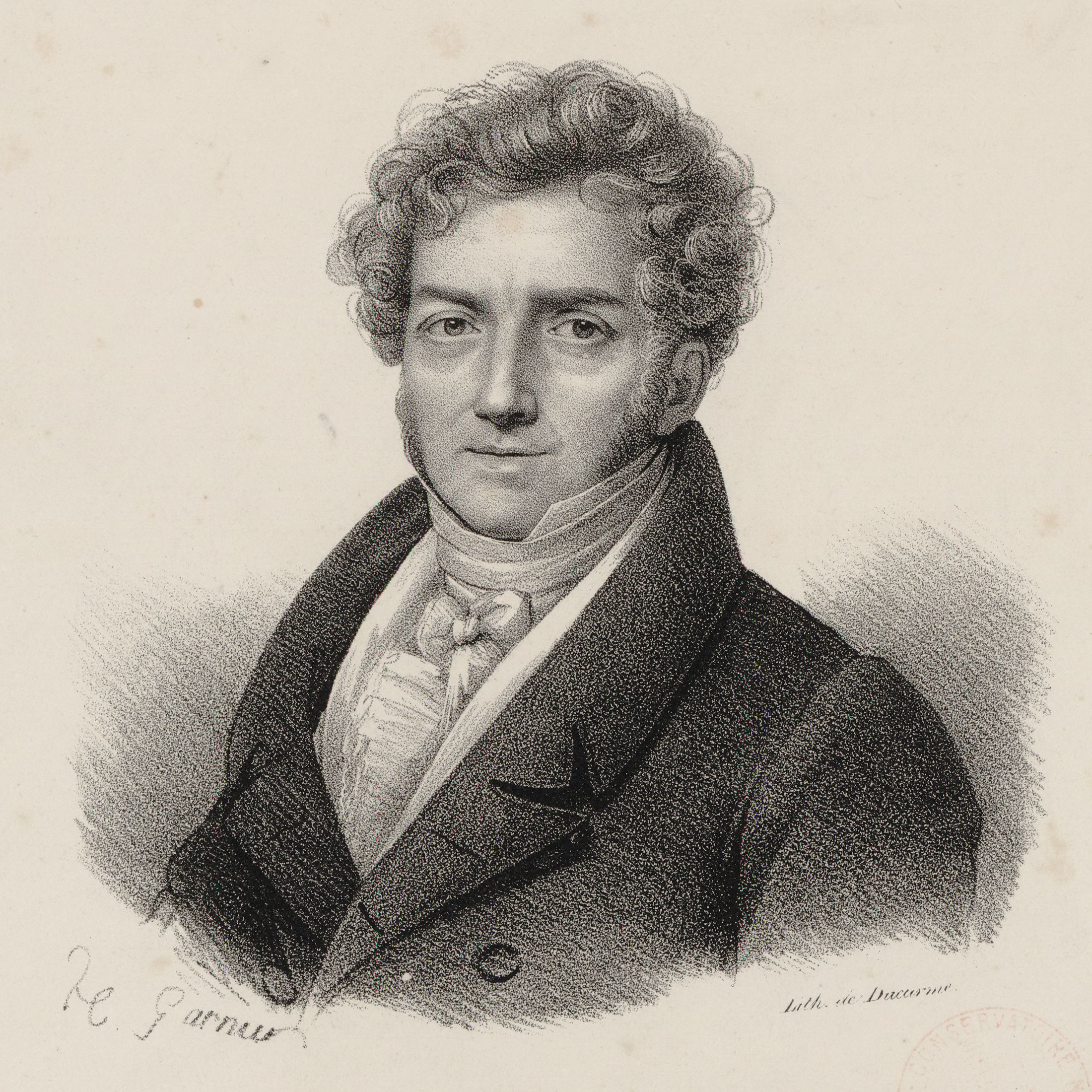
- The composer c. 1815
- Translation: The White Lady
- Librettist: Eugène Scribe
- Language: French
- Based on: novels by Walter Scott
- Premiere: 10 December 1825; Opéra-Comique, Paris

La dame blanche (French pronunciation: [la dam blɑ̃ʃ], The White Lady) is an opéra comique in three acts by the French composer François-Adrien Boieldieu. The libretto was written by Eugène Scribe and is based on episodes from no fewer than five works of the Scottish writer Sir Walter Scott, including his novels Guy Mannering (1815), The Monastery (1820), and The Abbot (1820). The opera has typical elements of the Romantic in its Gothic mode, including an exotic Scottish locale, a lost heir, a mysterious castle, a hidden fortune, and a ghost, in this case benevolent. The work was one of the first attempts to introduce the fantastic into opera and is a model for works such as Giacomo Meyerbeer's Robert le diable (1831) and Charles Gounod's Faust (1859). The opera's musical style also heavily influenced later operas like Lucia di Lammermoor, I puritani and La jolie fille de Perth.

== Performance history ==
La dame blanche was first performed on 10 December 1825 by the Opéra-Comique at the Théâtre Feydeau in Paris. It was a major success and became a standby of the 19th century operatic repertory in France and Germany. By 1862, the Opéra-Comique had given more than 1,000 performances of La dame blanche.

It was first performed in England in English as The White Lady at the Drury Lane Theatre on 9 October 1826, and in the United States in French at the Théâtre d'Orléans on 6 February 1827.

The opera's popularity began to diminish towards the very end of the 19th century and performances since have been rare. The opera was revived in Paris in 1996 by the conductor Marc Minkowski and in 2020 at the Opéra Comique. Various recordings of the opera have been made (see below).

The overture was put together from Boieldieu's themes by his student Adolphe Adam.

== Musical analysis ==
Boieldieu's score is highly expressive and full of striking numbers. Of particular note are Jenny's ballad, Brown's entrance aria and the music sung by Anna, which is highly florid and preceded by harp arpeggios whenever the White Lady appears. The central dramatic focus of the opera is the auction scene, an ensemble in the Italian style which has an intensity not equalled or surpassed by any other opéra comique of that period, either by Boieldieu or his contemporaries. The aria from the opera that is most often performed today in recital is the tenor aria, "Viens, gentille dame" ("Come, Gentle Lady"). The opera also makes use of Scottish folk tunes.

== Roles ==
Role	Voice type	Premiere Cast, 10 December 1825 (Conductor: Charles-Frédéric Kreubé)
Gaveston, old steward of the Counts of Avenel	bass	François-Louis Henry
Anna, his pupil	soprano	Antoinette-Eugénie Rigaut
Georges Brown, young English officer	tenor	Louis-Antoine-Eléonore Ponchard
Dickson, farmer of the Counts of Avenel	tenor	Louis Féréol
Jenny, his wife	mezzo-soprano	Marie-Julie Halligner
Marguerite, old servant of the Counts of Avenel	mezzo-soprano	Marie Desbrosses
Gabriel, servant at Dikson's farm	bass	Belnié
MacIrton, justice of the peace	bass	Firmin
Country people, etc. (chorus)

== Synopsis ==
Place: Scotland
Time: 1753

The Count and Countess Avenel have both died in exile, leaving the fate of their castle and estate to their wicked and dishonest steward, Gaveston. The property is supposed to go to the Avenels' son, Julien, but he is missing. Dickson, a tenant farmer on the land of the late Count, and his spouse Jenny are about to celebrate the baptism of their infant son when they realize that they do not have a godfather. A youthful officer in the English army, Georges Brown, offers to assume this role. Dickson informs Brown that the castle is going to be auctioned by Gaveston, who hopes to buy it and the title for himself. Jenny sings the Ballad of The White Lady ("D’ici voyez ce beau domaine"), the "White Lady" being the guardian spirit of the Avenels. Dickson receives correspondence from the White Lady, beckoning him to the castle. As he is too frightened to obey, Brown goes in his place.

Meanwhile, Anna, an orphan raised by the Avenels, tells the elderly housekeeper Marguerite how she cared for an injured soldier who reminded her of Julien, who was her childhood sweetheart. Gaveston proclaims his plans for the auction the next morning. Brown appears, seeking shelter for the night. Left alone, he sings the cavatina, "Viens, gentille dame". Anna enters, disguised as The White Lady, in a white veil. She recognizes Brown as the soldier she took care of in Hanover. Tomorrow he must obey her implicitly. Brown agrees to do so.

The following morning the auction takes place. On behalf of the Avenel tenants, Dickson bets in opposition to Gaveston but quickly reaches his limit. Encouraged by Anna to help Dickson, Brown places a bid in the auction and soon outbids the steward, buying the castle for 500,000 francs. However, Dickson does not have the money and if he does not pay before midday he will be thrown into prison.

Anna and Marguerite look for the statue of the White Lady, in which is stashed the wealth of the Avenels. Brown has a curious feeling that he somehow remembers the castle. Meanwhile, Gaveston receives the news that Georges Brown is in fact the missing Julien Avenel, although Brown himself does not know it. Anna overhears the news and sets a plan in motion. At the strike of 12 noon, the White Lady appears with a treasure chest. Thwarted, Gaveston tears off her veil in a rage to expose Anna, who then reveals Brown's true identity as Julien. Julien and Anna are happily reunited.

== Libretto ==
- La dame blanche (French Wikisource)

== Recordings ==
- 1961 – Michel Sénéchal (Georges Brown), Françoise Louvay (Anna), Jane Berbié (Jenny), Aimé Doniat (Dickson), Adrien Legros (Gaveston), Germaine Baudoz (Marguerite), Pierre Héral (Macirton) – Orchestre et Choeurs Raymond Saint-Paul, Pierre Stoll (conductor) – (Véga, Accord)
- 1964 – Nicolai Gedda, Mimi Aarden, Sophia Van Sant, Guus Hoekman, Erna Spoorenberg, Henk Drissen and Franz Vroons with Jean Fournet conducting the Hilversum Radio Chorus and Hilversum Radio Orchestra. Issued by Melodram and Opera D'Oro
- 1996 – Rockwell Blake (Georges Brown), Annick Massis (Anna), Mireille Delunsch (Jenny), Jean-Paul Fouchécourt (Dickson), Laurent Naouri (Gaveston), Sylvie Brunet (Marguerite), conducted by Marc Minkowski with the Choeur de Radio France and the Ensemble Orchestral de Paris (EMI Classics)
