= Édouard Cadol =

French playwright and novelist

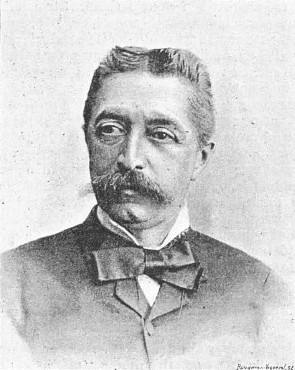
- Édouard Cadol by Léopold-Émile Reutlinger
- Born: 11 February 1831; Paris, Kingdom of France
- Died: 1 June 1898 (aged 67); Asnières-sur-Seine, France
- Occupations: Playwright; Novelist

Édouard Cadol (11 February 1831 – 1 June 1898) was a 19th-century French playwright and novelist.

== Biography ==
An employee at Chemins de Fer du Nord, Cadol soon left his position to dedicate himself entirely to literature. He made his debut as a critic in small newspapers such as the Courrier de Paris and the Journal de Francfort. He became secretary of the editorial board of Le Temps, wrote the drama chronicle in l’Esprit public, was one of the cofounders of l’Esprit français, published short stories in L'Univers, Le Monde illustré, l’Estafette, le Nord, while working in collaboration for theaters of the suburbs and the boulevards.

The brilliant success of his comedy, Les Inutiles, which reached 200 consecutive performances in 1868, established his reputation as a playwright. Therefore, many pieces went out of his pen. His novels include Rose, splendeurs et misères de la vie théâtrale (1873) and Hortense Maillot (1885).

Cadol also collaborated with Jules Verne on theatrical works, including an early version of Around the World in Eighty Days and Un neveu d’Amérique (A Nephew from America, 1873).

== Works ==
- 1856: La Mye du roy le onziesme, one-act drama, with Édouard Devicque, in-8° ;
- 1860: Le Jeune Homme au riflard, one-act comédie en vaudeville, with Charles Varin, in-18 ;
- 1862: Lettre à M. le marquis de Carabas sur les partis, in-8 ;
- 1863: La Germaine, three-act comedy, in prose, in-12 ;
- 1867: Les Ambitions de M. Fauvelle, five-act comedy, in-12 ;
- 1867: Contes gais. Les belles imbéciles, in-12 ;
- 1868: L’affaire est arrangée, one-act comedy, in-12 ;
- 1868: Les Inutiles, four-act comedy, in-12 ;
- 1870: La Belle Affaire, three-act comedy, in-12 ;
- 1870: La Fausse Monnaie, five-act comedy, in-12 ;
- 1870: Jacques Cernol, three-act comedy, in-12 ;
- 1870: Le Mystère, comedy in one act and in prose, in-12 ;
- 1871: Les Créanciers du bonheur, three-act comedy, in-12 ;
- 1871: Paris pendant le siège read online, Brussels, in-8° ;
- 1872: Le Spectre de Patrick, drame fantastique en cinq actes et neuf tableaux, in-12 ;
- 1872: Une Amourette, four-act comedy, in-12 ;
- 1872: Memnon, ou la Sagesse humaine, one-act opéra comique from a tale by Voltaire, in-12 ;
- 1873: Le Monde galant, in-12 ;
- 1873: Rose, splendeurs et misères de la vie théâtrale, in-12 ;
- 1874: Madame Élise, in-12 ;
- 1875: La Bête noire, in-12 ;
- 1876: Le Cheveu du diable, voyage fantastique au Japon, in-12 ;
- 1878: Berthe Sigelin, in-12 ;
- 1878: L’Enquête, three-act drama, in-12 ;
- 1878: La Grand’Maman, comedy in four acts in prose, in-12 ;
- 1878: Marguerite Chauveley, in-12 ;
- 1878: La Prima Donna, le père Raymond, in-12 ;
- 1879: La Diva, in-12 ;
- 1879: La Grande Vie, la Préférée, in-8° ;
- 1880: La Princesse Aïdée, tale imitated from Carlo Gozzi, followed by Marianne and Georges Pairier, in-12 ;
- 1880: La Comtesse Berthe, four-act play, in-12 ;
- 1881: Un Enfant d’Israël, in-12 ;
- 1881: Le Fils adultérin, in-12 ;
- 1882: La Revanche d’une honnête femme, in-12 ;
- 1882: Son Excellence Satinette (affaires étrangères), in-12 ;
- 1883: La Belle Virginie, in-12 ;
- 1883: Cathy, in-12 ;
- 1883: Mademoiselle ma mère, in-12 ;
- 1883: Son Altesse, in-12 ;
- 1884: Tout seul, aventures d’un prétendant à travers le monde, in-12 ;
- 1884: La Vie en l’air, in-12 ;
- 1885: Hortense Maillot, in-12 ;
- 1885: Les Parents riches, in-12 ;
- 1886: Les Amours de Chicot, in-8° ;
- 1886: Les Erreurs de la guillotine, in-8° ;
- 1886: Lucette, in-8° ;
- 1886: Madame veuve Émilie, in-8 ;
- 1886: Le Meilleur Monde, in-12 ;
- 1887: Gilberte, Paris, in-12 ;
- 1887: Mademoiselle, in-12 ;
- 1888: Mariage de princesse, in-12 ;
- 1889: Le Parasite, in-32 ;
- 1889: Chère Madame, in-12 ;
- 1890: André Laroche, in-12 ;
- 1890: Le Chemin de Mazas, in-12 ;
- 1890: Les Filles séduites, in-4 ;
- 1891: La Fiancée anonyme, in-12 ;
- 1892: Mademoiselle Raymonde, in-12 ;
- 1892: Le Fils adoptif, in-12 ;
- 1893: Le Cher Maître, in-12 ;
- 1893: Le Roi de la Création, in-12 ;
- 1893: Thérèse Gervais, in-12 ;
- 1894: La Belle Armande, in-32 ;
- 1894: Le Bésigue chinois, one-act comedy in prose, in-12 ;
- 1894: Les Bouilleurs de cru. Mademoiselle Michu, in-32 ;
- 1894: Le Secrétaire particulier, in-12 ;
- 1894: Suzanne Herbain, in-12 ;
- 1895: Madeleine Houlard, in-12 ;
- 1896: L’Archiduchesse, in-12 ;
- 1897: Théâtre inédit (La Fête, le Mariage rompu, Son Altesse), in-12.

== Sources ==
- Édouard Cadol on Wikisource
- Polybiblion; revue bibliographique universelle. Vol. 83. Paris: Aux bureaux de la revue. 1898. pp. 84–5..
