= La Maison de Pénarvan =

Novel by Jules Sandeau

La Maison de Pénarvan ('The House of Penarvan') is a novel by the French author Jules Sandeau, published in 1858.

== Plot ==
The scene of this semi-historical romance is laid in Brittany, and the story opens in the year VI. of the Republic. Mademoiselle Renée de Penarvan is living in an old château near Nantes, her only companion being the aged Abbé Pyrmil. They are both devoted to the glories of the ancient house; and Pyrmil is writing its history, the chapters of which René illuminates with Gothic tracery and emblazonment. She is the last of her race and will not marry. But an unexpected incident alters her resolve. The Abbé has discovered that a male heir exists,—a plain, simple-hearted youth named Paul, living on the produce of his farm and about to marry a miller's daughter. To prevent such a horrible disgrace René marries him herself, somewhat against his will. She then puts a sword into his reluctant hand and sends him to La Vendée to fight for his legitimate king. He returns wounded, and she is prouder of him than ever. But he dies, not without telling her that he no longer loves her, for she does not really love him. She is a heroine, not a woman. She was in love with a hero, a paladin, not with the artless country boy, who only desired to live at peace. Their child, whom René cannot forgive for being a girl, grows up. Her timidity, gentleness, and simple tastes, are hateful to the proud châtelaine; and when she falls in love with a bourgeois, the mother's anger is terrible. But the daughter conceals a firm will under her modest exterior, and ultimately marries the man of her choice. René is forced to yield, and finally admits that she has not fulfilled her duties as a wife and a mother.

== Appraisal ==
This was the best known of Sandeau's works outside France in the early twentieth century. According to Helen Rex Keller, "It contains one of his most skillfully constructed plots. The contrasted characters of René, her husband, and her daughter, show great psychological knowledge and skill. The portrait of the Abbé Pyrmil is not unworthy to rank beside that of Dominie Sampson."

== Sources ==
- Gibson, Robert (2005). "2. The Land of Lost Content". The End of Youth: The Life and Work of Alain-Fournier. Exeter: Impress Books Ltd. p. 25.

Attribution:

- Keller, Helen Rex (1924). "House of Penarvan, The". In The Reader's Digest of Books. The Library of the World's Best Literature. New York: The Macmillan Company. pp. 410–411.
