= Le maçon =

Opera by Daniel Auber

Act 1, original production

Le maçon (French for The Mason) is an opéra comique in three acts by Daniel Auber to a libretto by Eugène Scribe and Germain Delavigne. It premiered at the Opéra-Comique Salle Feydeau in Paris on 3 May 1825. It was to become Auber's first enduring success.

Among the original cast was the tenor Antoine Ponchard.

== Synopsis ==
Le maçon is set in Paris, in the Faubourg Saint-Antoine, around 1820.

=== Act 1 ===
Roger, a mason, and his bride Henriette (the sister of his friend Baptiste, a locksmith) are rejoicing at their wedding. An officer, Léon de Mérinville, whose life was once saved by Roger, arrives at the wedding reception. He explains that he is on his way to a nearby château to release Irma, a young Greek girl who is being held against her will by some Turks. Two figures in muffled in cloaks arrive, and secretly abduct Roger and Baptiste at knifepoint from the wedding reception.

=== Act 2 ===
Léon has been seized by the Turks. Irma and Léon's plans of escape have been discovered. Turkish slaves Usbeck and Rica who had kidnapped Roger and Baptiste arrive at the château with the two blindfolded men. The mason and locksmith are forced to build a prison. Roger recognizes with dismay that it is meant for Léon. The now repentant Turk, Rica, tries to help Irma and Léon to escape, but they are let down by Baptiste's cowardice and captured. He and Roger are forced to wall up the three alive.

=== Act 3 ===
Roger and Baptiste are guided back home, again with their eyes blindfolded, but their homecoming is detected by an incensed Henriette, who tells them they were seen entering the château of the Turkish ambassador. This information solves the mystery of the château's location, and the mason and locksmith rush out crying, "They are saved!". When they find that the Turks have bolted from the embassy, then they set the prisoners are free.
