= Gustave Aimard =

French author (1818–1883)

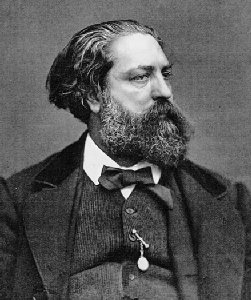
Gustave Aimard

Gustave Aimard (13 September 1818 – 20 June 1883) was the author of numerous books about Latin America and the American frontier.

Aimard was born Olivier Aimard in Paris. As he once said, he was the son of two people who were married, "but not to each other". His father, François Sébastiani de la Porta (1775–1851) was a general in Napoleon’s army and one of the ambassadors of the Louis Philippe government. Sébastiani was married to the Duchess de Coigny. In 1806 the couple produced a daughter: Alatrice-Rosalba Fanny. Shortly after her birth the mother died. Fanny was raised by her grandmother, the Duchess de Coigny. According to the New York Times of July 9, 1883, Aimard’s mother was Mme. de Faudoas, married to Anne Jean Marie René de Savary, Duke de Rovigo (1774–1833).

Aimard was given as a baby to a family that was paid to raise him. By the age of nine or twelve he was sent off on a herring ship. Later, around 1838, he served for a short while with the French Navy. After one more stay in America (where, according to himself, he was adopted into a Comanche tribe), Aimard returned to Paris in 1847 – the same year his half-sister, Duchess de Choiseul-Pralin, was brutally murdered by her noble husband. Reconciliation with, or acknowledgement by, his biological family did not happen. After having served for a short while at the Garde Mobil Aimard left again for the Americas. This time he was among the 150 miners hired by Duke de Raousset-Boulbon, who wanted to mine in Mexico. However, mining permits were not issued, and the duke decided ‘to free’ the poor people of Mexico. He conquered Hermosillo on 13 October 1852. The duke fell severely ill on the first night of his conquest, and the Hermosillo villagers right away re-took their village. The miners fled and Aimard again returned to France.

In 1854 he married Adèle Lucie Damoreau, an ‘artiste lyrique’. He wrote about seventy books, many of them about American Indians. Most of his Indian books were translated into over ten languages. Their reviews mostly deal with the question whether they would harm children or not or whether they are too bloody or not. However, between the lines of his books many autobiographical, anthropological, and historical facts are hidden. Writing about the French-German war, in which his country had been defeated, caused Aimard to lose his readership. His 1852 Mexican adventure is described in Curumilla; the history of the murder of his half-sister Fanny in Te Land en Te Water I & II.

In 1870 Aimard and other members of the press participated in the Franco-Prussian War and in the short-lived success at the Battle of Le Bourget.

In 1879 Aimard visited Rio de Janeiro where he was received by the Emperor Dom Pedro II of Brazil and feted by the literary community. His journal of the journey appeared as Mon Dernier Voyage, Le Brésil Nouveau (1886).

== Works ==
- The Frontiersmen (1854)
- The Border Rifles: A Tale of the Texan War
- The Indian Scout: A Story of the Aztec City
- Stronghand; or, The Noble Revenge
- The Buccaneer Chief: A Romance of the Spanish Main
- The Trail-Hunter: A Tale of the Far (1861)
- The Freebooters: A Story of the Texan War
- The Red River Half-Breed: A Tale of the Wild North-West (1860-1855)
- The Guide of the Desert (1863-1855)
- The Treasure of Pearls: A Romance of Adventures in California (1863-1885)
- The Flying Horseman (1863-1885)
- The Prairie Flower: A Tale of the Indian Border (1874)
- The Red Track: A Story of Social Life in Mexico (187?)
- The Pirates of the Prairies: Adventures in the American Desert
- The Pearl of the Andes: A Tale of Love and Adventure (1884)

== Sources ==
- Translated from nl:Gustave Aimard
