= Amelia Gere Mason =

American writer

- Born: Amelia Ruth Gere; September 23, 1831; Northampton, Massachusetts, US
- Died: August 11, 1923 (aged 91); Chicago, Illinois, US
- Resting place: Graceland Cemetery
- Occupation: Writer
- Spouse: Alvin A. Mason

Amelia Gere Mason (1831–1923) was an American writer.

== Biography ==
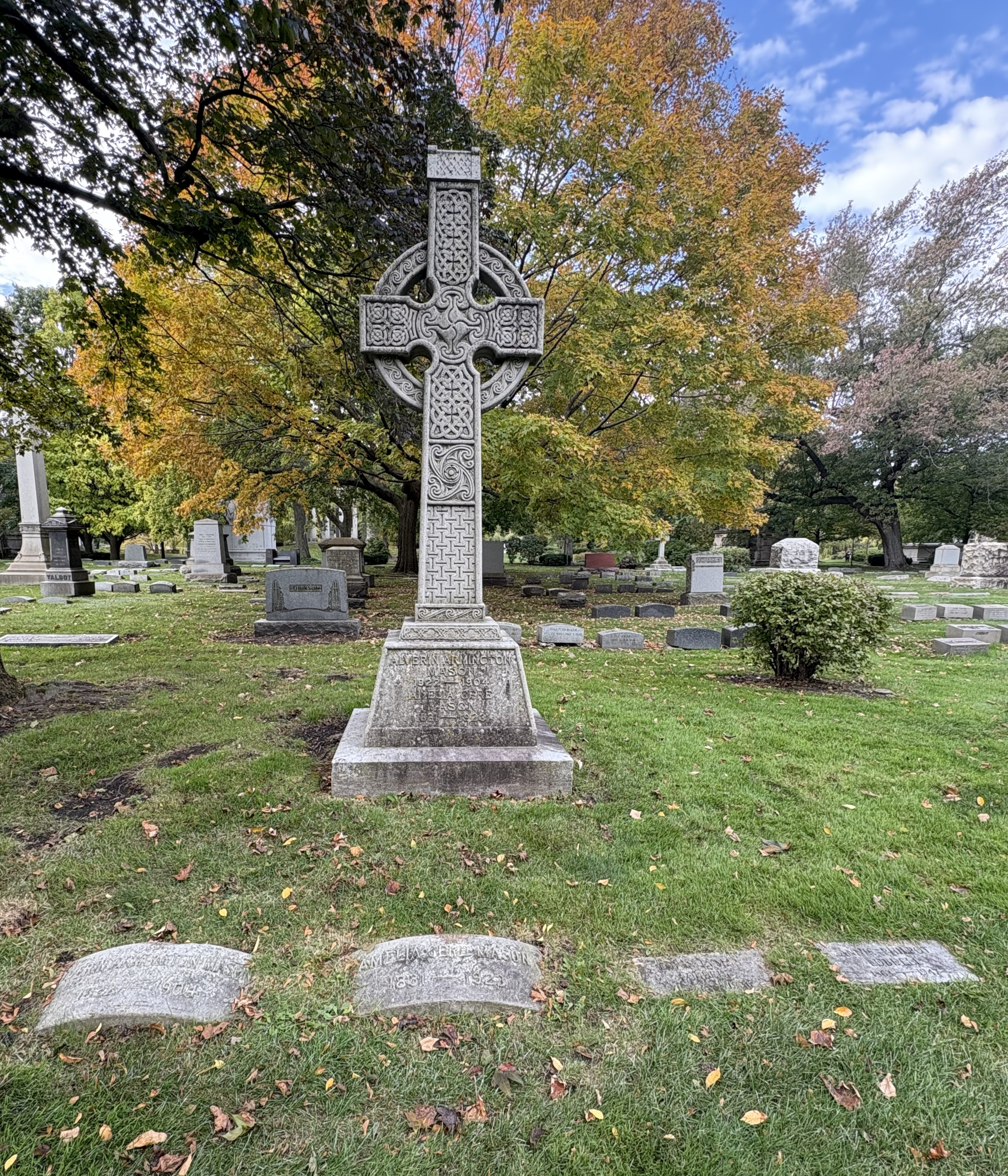
Mason's grave at Graceland Cemetery

Mason née Gere was born on September 23, 1831, in Northampton, Massachusetts. She was married to Alvin A. Mason. Gere wrote for the Atlantic Monthly magazine. She was the author of The Women of the French Salons (1891) and Woman in the Golden Ages (1901). Women of the French Salons included chapters on Madame du Deffand, Mademoiselle de Lespinasse, Madame Geoffrin, Madame d'Épinay, Madame Roland, Madame Necker, Madame de Staël, Madame Récamier, Madame de Sévigné, and Madame Vigée Le Brun.

Mason died in Chicago, Illinois on August 11, 1923, and was buried at Graceland Cemetery.
