= Adolphe Belot =

French playwright and writer (1829–1890)

Louis Belot
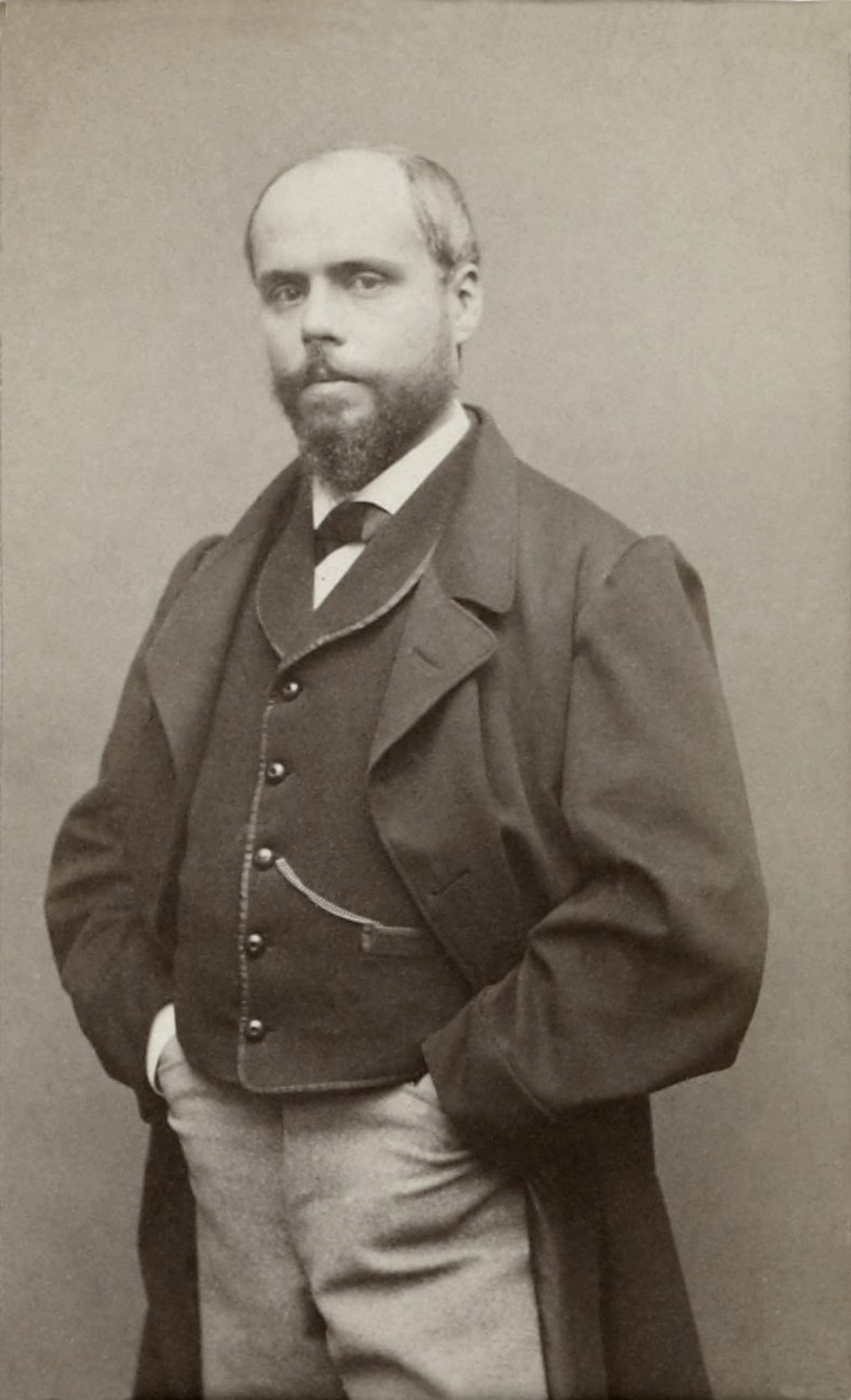
- Born: Louis Marc Adolphe Belot; 6 November 1829; Pointe-à-Pitre, Guadeloupe, France
- Died: 18 December 1890 (aged 61); Paris, France
- Education: Collège Sainte-Barbe; University of Paris Faculty of Law
- Occupations: Writer, playwright and novelist

Louis Marc Adolphe Belot (French pronunciation: [adɔlf bəlo]; 6 November 1829 – 18 December 1890) was a French playwright and novelist.

== Biography ==
Adolphe Belot was the son of an attorney employed by the Pointe-à-Pitre court, who had been born in Le Havre, France. Adolphe Belot was educated at the prestigious Collège Sainte-Barbe in metropolitan France and went on to obtain his degree at the Faculty of Law in Paris. In 1854, he was registered at the law society (tableau des avocats)in Nancy.

After several trips to the Americas, he devoted himself to writing, publishing Le Châtiment in 1855 before approaching the theater with the comedy À la Campagne in 1857. In 1859, in collaboration with Charles Edmond Villetard de Prunières, he wrote Le Testament de César Girodot, a show which was performed over 500 times at the Odéon theater.

Belot wrote the novel Mademoiselle Giraud, My Wife in 1870, centered around a naive young man and his eponymous wife who refuses to consummate their marriage. The book was an immense success, selling at least 66,000 copies and has been published in 33 editions around the world.

Belot died of pulmonary congestion at the age of 61, on 18 December 1890.

Belot fathered two daughters: Marthe and Jeanne, the latter of which became an actress at the Odéon theatre under the pseudonym of "Miss Belly". She died of typhoid fever in January 1899.

== Theater works ==
- 1859 Un Secret de Famille, 5 acts, Théâtre de l'Ambigu
- 1860 La Vengeance du Mari, 3 acts, Théâtre de l'Odéon
- 1861 Les Parents Terribles, 3 acts, a collaboration with Léon Journault, Théâtre de l'Odéon
- 1862 Les Maris à Système, 3 acts, Théâtre du Gymnase
- 1862 Le Vrai Courage, 2 acts, Théâtre du Vaudeville
- 1863 Les Indifférents, 4 acts, Théâtre de l'Odéon
- 1865 Le Passé de M. Jouanne, 4 acts, a collaboration with Henri Crisafulli, Théâtre du Gymnase
- 1865 L’Habitude et le Souvenir, 4 acts, Théâtre du Vaudeville
- 1867 La Vénus de Gordes, with Ernest Daudet
- 1867 Les Souvenirs, 4 acts, Théâtre du Vaudeville
- 1868 Le Drame de la Rue de la Paix, 5 acts, Théâtre de l'Odéon
- 1868 Miss Multon, 3 acts, with Eugène Nus, Théâtre du Vaudeville, 150 shows
- 1869 La Leçon du Jour, 4 acts, with Eugène Nus, Théâtre du Vaudeville
- 1871 L’Article 47, 5 acts, Théâtre de l’Ambigu, 100 shows
- 1873 La Marquise, 4 acts, with Eugène Nus, Théatre du Gymnase
- 1876 Fromont Jeune et Risler Aîné, 5 acts, (adaptation of a novel by Alphonse Daudet), Théâtre du Vaudeville
- 1880 Les Étrangleurs de Paris, a drama in 5 acts and 12 scenes, Théâtre de la Porte Saint-Martin
- 1885 Sapho, 5 acts, (adaptation of a novel by Alphonse Daudet), Théâtre du Gymnase; (an English translation by Elizabeth Beall Ginty)

== Short stories and novels ==
- "Un Cas de Conscience"
- Le Secret Terrible, a collaboration with Jules Dautin, Dentu, Paris
- Le Parricide, a collaboration with Jules Dautin, Dentu, Paris
- Dacolard et Lubin (sequel to Le Parricide), a collaboration with Jules Dautin, Dentu, Paris
- La Sultane Parisienne, Dentu, Paris
- Nouvelles, 1857
- Trois nouvelles, 1863
- La Vénus de Gordes, a collaboration with Ernest Daudet, 1866
- Le Drame de la Rue de la Paix, Michel Lévy frères, Paris, 1867
- L'Article 47 (La fille de couleur; Le journal d'une jeune fille; La haute police), Dentu, Paris, 1870
- Mademoiselle Giraud, ma femme, 1870
- La Femme de feu, 1872
- Hélène et Mathilde, 1874
- Les Mystères Mondains, 1875

== Awards and honors ==
- Legion of Honour - 1867.
