= Jules Sandeau =

French writer (1811–1883)

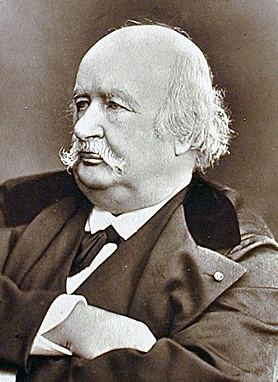
Sandeau, c. 1880

Léonard Sylvain Julien (Jules) Sandeau (French: [sɑ̃do]; 19 February 1811 – 24 April 1883) was a French novelist.

== Early life ==
Sandeau was born at Aubusson (Creuse), and was sent to Paris to study law, but spent much of his time in unruly behaviour with other students. He met George Sand, then Madame Dudevant, at Le Coudray in the house of a friend, and when she came to Paris in 1831 they had a relationship. The intimacy did not last long, but it produced Rose et Blanche (1831), a novel written together under the pseudonym J. Sand, from which George Sand took her famous pseudonym.

== Major works ==
Sandeau continued to produce novels and plays for nearly fifty years. His major works are:

- Marianna (1839), in which he draws a portrait of George Sand
- Le Docteur Herbeau (1841)
- Catherine (1845)
- Mademoiselle de la Seiglière (1848), a successful picture of society under Louis Philippe, dramatized in 1851
- Madeleine (1848)
- La Chasse au roman (1849)
- Sacs et parchemins (1851)
- La Maison de Penarvan (1858)
- La Roche aux mouettes (1871)

The famous play, Le Gendre de M. Poirier, was one of several which he wrote in collaboration with Émile Augier, the novelist usually contributing the story and the dramatist the theatrical form. Sandeau's novels were less popular than his plays.

== Later life ==
Sandeau had been made conservateur of the Mazarin library in 1853, elected to the Académie française in 1858, and appointed librarian of Saint-Cloud in 1859. At the suppression of this latter office, after the fall of the Second French Empire, he was pensioned.

== Death ==
Jules Sandeau died in Paris in 1883 and was buried in the Cimetière du Montparnasse.
