= Marie Desbrosses =

French operatic mezzo-soprano (1764–1856)

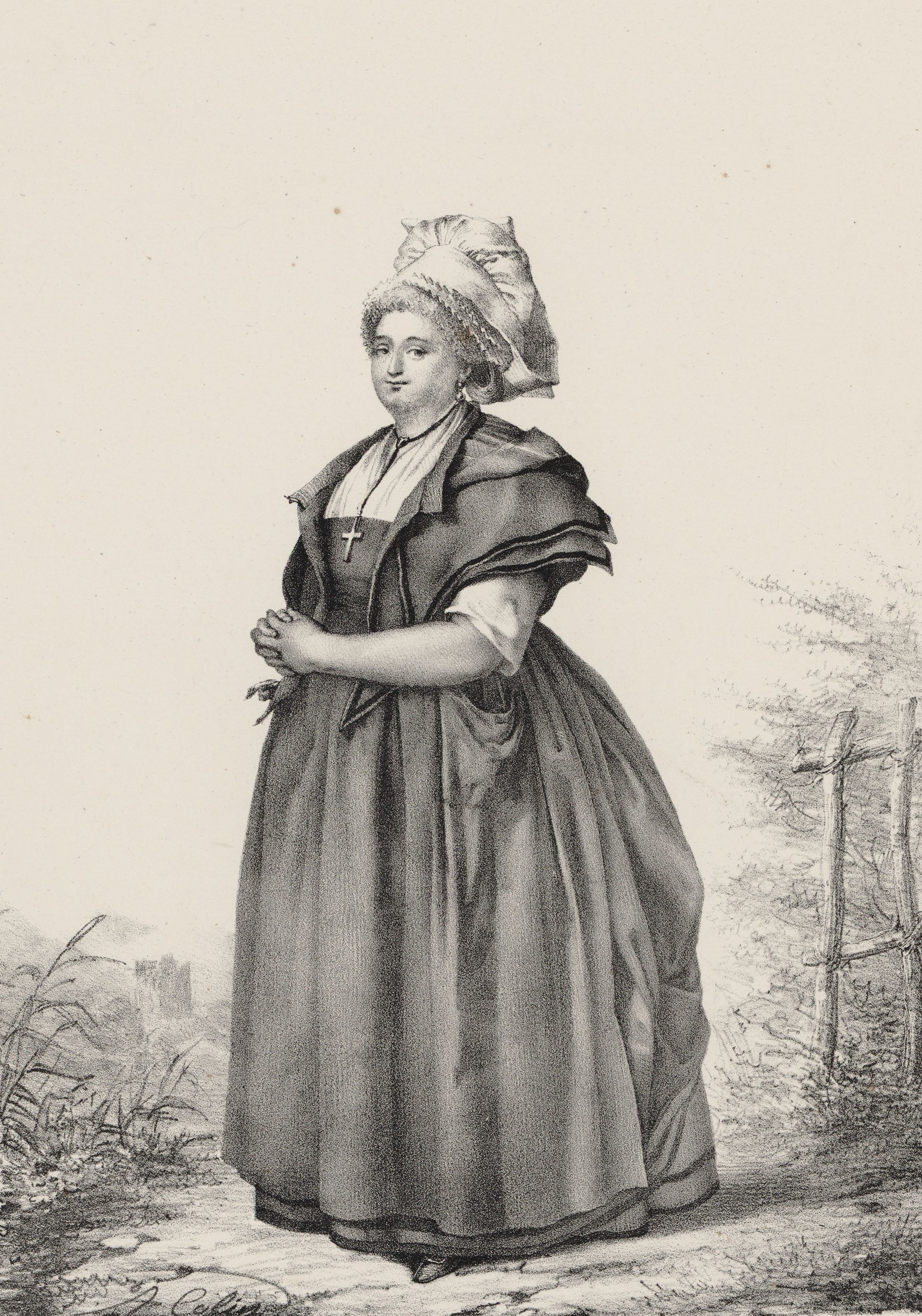
- Marie Desbrosses in the role of Mother Germaine in Mehul's La journée aux aventures in the opera's 1816 world premiere
- Born: 8 March 1764; Paris, France
- Died: 3 March 1856 (aged 91); Paris, France
- Occupation: Operatic mezzo-soprano
- Organizations: Comédie-Italienne

Marie-Françoise Desbrosses (8 March 1764 – 3 March 1856), was a French operatic mezzo-soprano. She made her stage debut at the Comédie-Italienne in 1776, at age 13, and remained with the company for almost five decades, creating several roles.

== Life ==
Desbrosses was born in Paris, the daughter of the actor and composer Robert Desbrosses and Marie-Françoise Petitjean, and the elder sister of Eulalie Desbrosses.

At the age of six she performed couplets in front of Louis XV, accompanied by Madame Dugazon's brother, Joseph Lefebvre, a violinist. In 1776, Desbrosses began her dramatic career, at age 13, at the Comédie-Italienne, rue Mauconseil, in the role of Justine in Le Sorcier and Colinette in the operetta Clochette. She successively appeared in roles of girls, trousers roles, lovers, mothers and old women.

Desbrosses asked for her retirement in 1796, played for a while in the provinces, returned to Paris in 1798, and joined the Théâtre Feydeau. When the two theatres were reunited in 1801, she resumed her seniority rank in the new society of actors of the Opéra-Comique. She devoted herself especially to character roles and old women, succeeding Madame Gonthier. She had success in Boieldieu's La Fête du village voisin, La jeune Femme colère and La dame blanche, in Nicolas Isouard's Lully et Quinault, Mehul's La journée aux aventures, and especially in Rodolphe Kreutzer's Jadis et aujourd'hui, Louis-Emmanuel Jadin's Fanfan et Colas, Pierre Gaveaux's Le traité nul, Le Sueur's La caverne and Boieldieu's Ma tante Aurore.

Desbrosses gave her "final" performance in 1823; but at the urging of the authorities, and encouraged by the solicitations of her comrades, she determined to prolong her dramatic career for another six years, until 1829, when she definitively left the theatre, and turned to voice teaching.

Marie Debrosses died in Paris on 3 March 1856 at the age of 91.

== World premieres ==
Desbrosses created several roles, including:

- 1779: A maid in André Grétry's Les mariages samnites, premiered at the Comédie-Italienne (hôtel de Bourgogne) in Paris, 12 June
- 1786: Colette in Lucile Grétry's Le mariage d'Antonio (libretto by De Beaunoir), premiered at the Comédie-Italienne, 29 July
- 1793: Le Sueur: La caverne, 16 February
- 1803: Boieldieu's: Ma tante Aurore, 13 January
- 1808: Rodolphe Kreutzer's Jadis et aujourd'hui, 29 October
- 1812: Mlle de la Bouquinière in Nicolas Isouard's Lully et Quinault, 27 February
- 1816: Boieldieu's La Fete , 5 March
- 1816: Mother Germain in Mehul's La journée aux aventures premiered at the Opéra-Comique (salle Feydeau), 16 November
- 1819: Inn-keeper in Daniel Auber's Le testament et les billets doux, 18 September
- 1820: Mother Berthe in Auber's La bergère châtelaine, 27 January
- 1822: Louis-Emmanuel Jadin's Fanfan et Colas ou les frères de laits
- 1823: Gouvernante in Auber's La neige, ou Le nouvel Eginhard, 8 October
- 1825: Marguerite in Boieldieu's La dame blanche, premiered at the Opéra-Comique (salle Feydeau), 10 December
- 1827: Valentine in George Onslow's Le Colporteur

== Private life ==
Desbrosses had a relationship with a banker, Alexandre-Henri Tassin de Moulaine, with whom she had a daughter, Adéle-Charlotte-Henriette Tassin de Moulaine, born in 1790.

In 1791, she became the godmother of the son of Joseph Fiévée and his colleague at the Comédie italienne, Adélaïde Françoise Guignard, known as Mademoiselle Lescot
