= Henri Crisafulli =

French writer (1827–1900)

Henri Xavier François Pierre Crisafulli (29 June 1827, Naples – 5 March 1900, Paris age 62) was a 19th-century French playwright and novelist.

Crisafulli studied at collège Charlemagne in Paris. He made his theatre debut in 1855. In addition to his plays, he also wrote novels in collaboration with Gustave Aimard and translated from Dutch. He is buried at Montmartre Cemetery.

== Theatre ==
- 1855: César Borgia, with Édouard Devicque, Théâtre de l'Ambigu
- 1856: Marie Stuart en Écosse, with Édouard Devicque, Ancien Cirque
- 1857: Les Deux Faubouriens, with Édouard Devicque
- 1858: Girofle Giroflà, with Édouard Devicque
- 1861: Ernest Ramel, with Édouard Devicque, Théâtre du Vaudeville
- 1863: Le Démon du jeu, Théâtre du Gymnase
- 1864: Mr et Mme Fernel, from the novel by Louis Ulbach, comédie en vaudeville
- 1865: Le Passé de M. Jouanne, Gymnase
- 1866: Le Fou d’en face, one-act comedy
- 1867: La Chouanne, from the novel by Paul Féval, Ambigu
- 1868: Les Loups et les Agneaux, five-act comedy
- 1869: Autour du lac, one-act comedy
- 1873: Les Postillons de Fougerolles, five-act drama
- 1873: La Falaise de Penmarck, five-act drama
- 1875: L’Idole, five-act drama
- 1876: L’Affaire Coverley, five-act dram
- Lord Harrington, five-act comedy
- 1879: Les Petites Lionnes, three-act comedy, with Paul Sipière
- 1879: Le Petit Ludovic, three-act comedy, with Victor Bernard
- 1881: Le Bonnet de coton, five-act comedy, with Victor Bernard
- 1881: Les Noces d’argent, play in three acts, with Victor Bernard
- 1887: Une perle, three-act play
- 1883: Le Vertigo, opéra bouffe with Henry Bocage.

== Short stories and novels ==
- 1866–1867: Les Invisibles de Paris, with Gustave Aimard, 5 vol.
- 1867: Les Compagnons de la lune, with Gustave Aimard, Amyot, Paris, in-18.
- 1872: Le Roi Marthe, Bureaux de l’administration du Figaro, Paris, in-8°

== Translations ==
- 1878: Max Havelaar, Van der Hoeven en Buys, Rotterdam, 2 vol.

== Sources ==
- De Gubernatis, Angelo (1890). Dictionnaire international des écrivains du jour (in French). Vol. 2. Florence: Louis Niccolai. p. 734..
