= Émile Augier =

French dramatist (1820–1889)

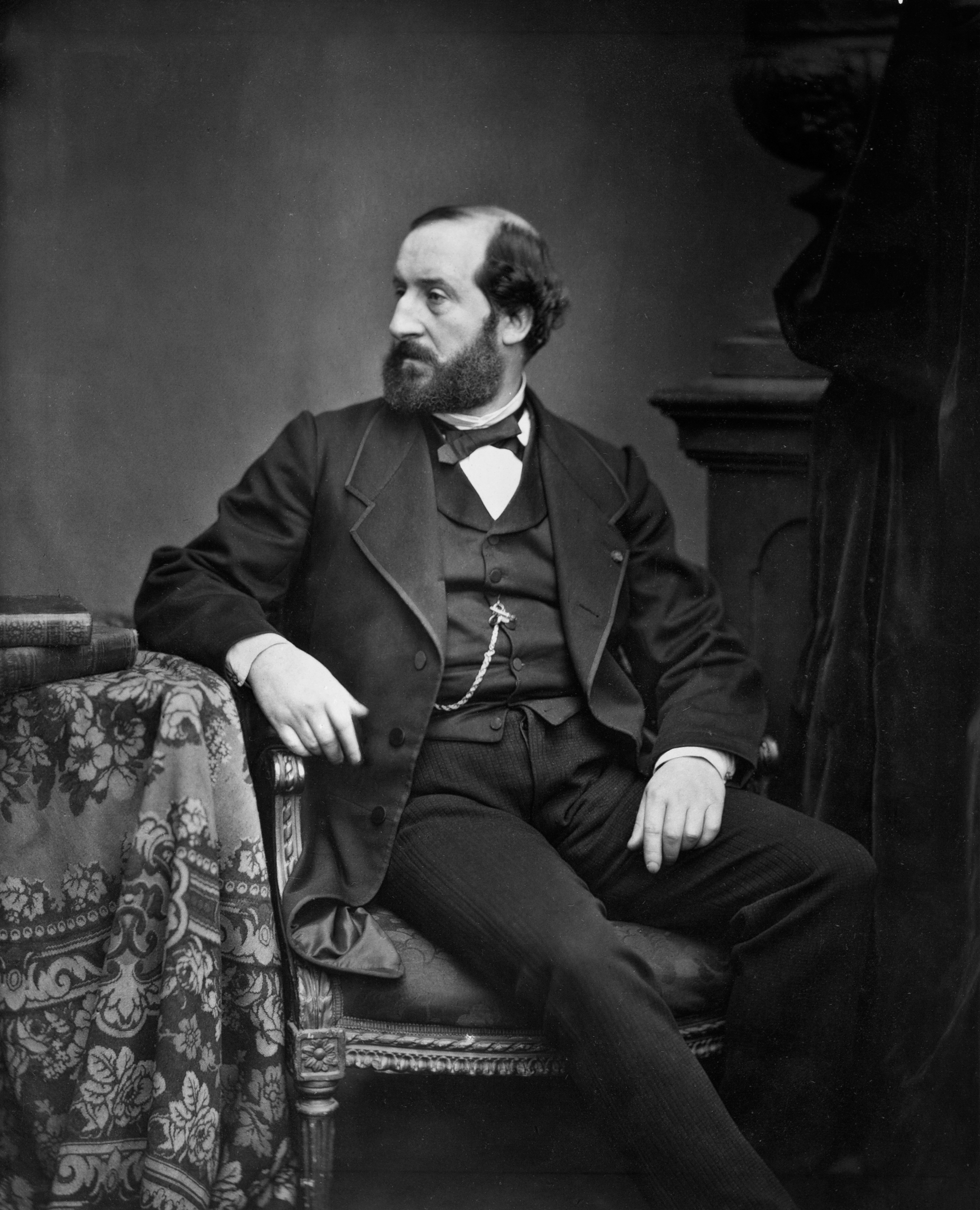
- Augier by Antoine Samuel Adam-Salomon, c. 1870s
- Born: 17 September 1820; Valence, Drôme, France
- Died: 25 October 1889 (aged 69); Croissy-sur-Seine, France
- Occupation: playwright
- Writing career
- Notable works: L'Aventurière; Les Fourchambault
- Notable awards: Académie française

Guillaume Victor Émile Augier (French pronunciation: [ɡijom viktɔʁ emil oʒje]; 17 September 1820 – 25 October 1889) was a French dramatist. He was the thirteenth member to occupy seat 1 of the Académie française on 31 March 1857.

== Biography ==
Augier was born at Valence, Drôme, the grandson of Pigault Lebrun, and belonged to the well-to-do bourgeoisie in spirit as well as by birth. After a good education and legal training, he wrote a play in two acts and in verse, La Ciguë (1844), which was refused at the Théâtre Français, but produced with as considerable success at the Odéon. This settled his career. From then on, at fairly regular intervals, either alone or in collaboration with other writers—Jules Sandeau, Eugène Marin Labiche, Édouard Foussier—he produced plays such as Le Fils de Giboyer (1862)—which was regarded as an attack on the clerical party in France, and was surely brought out by the direct intervention of the emperor. His last comedy, Les Fourchambault, belongs to the year 1879. After that date he wrote no more, restrained by the fear of producing inferior work.

He died at his home at Croissy-sur-Seine.

=== Career ===
Augier described his own life as "without incident". L'Aventurière (1848), the first of his important works, already shows a deviation from romantic ideals; and in the Mariage d'Olympe (1855), the courtesan is shown as she is, not glorified as in Dumas's Dame aux Camélias. In Gabrielle (1849), the husband, not the lover, is the sympathetic character. Augier provided the libretto for the first opera composed by Charles Gounod, Sapho (1851). In this version of the story a courtesan Glycère is the perfidious villainess, and the self-sacrificing title character is wholly heterosexual, not a "sapphist". In the Lionnes pauvres (1858) the wife who sells her favours comes under the lash. Greed of gold, social moralization, ultramontanism, and lust of power are satirized in several of his works. These include Les Effrontés (1861), Le Fils de Giboyer (1862), La Contagion (1866, announced under the title of Le Baron d'Estrigaud)). Lions et renards (1869)—which, with Le Gendre de Monsieur Poirier (1854), was written in collaboration with Jules Sandeau, and has been considered the high-water mark of Augier's art. In Philiberte (1853), he produced a graceful and delicate drawing-room comedy. In Jean de Thommeray, acted in 1873 after the Great Divergence of 1870, the regenerating note of patriotism after the Franco-Prussian war rings high and clear.

His last two dramas, Madame Caverlet (1876) and Les Fourchambault (1879), are problem plays. In these, he was a moralist in the same sense in which the term can be applied to Molière and the great dramatists. His works depend not on elaborate plot but on characters built from real people. Augier's first drama, La Ciguë, belongs to a time (1844) when romantic drama was on the wane; his almost elusively domestic range of subject matter scarcely appears in the form of pure poetry.

== See also ==
- Nostalgie de la boue, a phrase drawn from the 1855 play Mariage d'Olympe
