= Olympe's Marriage =

1855 play

- Original language: French
- Written by: Emile Augier
- Setting: Germany, Austria, 1854

Premiere
- Date: 17 July 1855
- Place: Théâtre du Vaudeville

Olympe's Marriage (French: Le Mariage d'Olympe) is an 1855 play by French writer Emile Augier, written as a response to Dumas's 1849 play La Dame aux Camelias. Augier's drama takes place over a course of several months in the year 1854.

The play premiered at the Théâtre du Vaudeville on July 17, 1855.

In 1901, Clyde Fitch adapted Olympe's Marriage into the dramedy The Marriage Game, relocating the action to Edwardian England and changing the dramatis personae's nationality accordingly.

== Plot ==
=== Act I ===
In a fashionable watering place in the fictitious town Pilnitz, situated in Germany, the Baron de Montrichard and an elderly Marquis discuss the recent death of Olympe Taverny, a Parisian courtesan. According to newspaper reports, Olympe died in California after contracting yellow fever. As the Marquis has never returned to France since the June Rebellion, he was unfamiliar with Olympe and consequently has never seen her, while de Montrichard was a frequent customer. The Marquis is joined by the ailing Marquise and their granddaughter Genevieve de Wurzen, who has been raised in Germany and Austria. The three leave for another area of the spa.

In the meantime, Baudel, who has occasionally interjected in the conversation between the Baron and the Marquis, decides to formally make the former's acquaintance. Although Baudel introduces himself as Anatole de Beausejours, Montrichard quickly deduces that he is not of aristocratic origins. Baudel reveals that Baudel is his patronymic name. His father was a milliner who married a wealthy woman, but Baudel's inheritance still fails to grant him entry into the world of the aristocracy. Baudel offers to pay Montrichard to stage a duel with him; thus, Baudel will be accepted by society. Montrichard is in want of money, desires to marry Genevieve, and has grown somewhat fond of Baudel, so he assents. Baudel leaves and promises to send Montrichard his seconds.

Olympe Taverny, whose real name is Pauline Morin, enters shortly thereafter. Although Montrichard recognizes her, she assures him that he is mistaken; she insists that she is the Countess de Puygiron, another person. Montrichard knows she is lying, and calls her bluff. Pauline reveals that she is really Olympe Taverny, and has faked her death in order to ensure that she enters a life of respectability as the wife of Henri, Count de Puygiron, whose marriage has still not been revealed to his family. Henri's strict father has died, but he is the nephew of the Marquis. In order to seduce Henri into marrying her and as a means of maintaining his affections, Pauline has aped the romantic depictions of virtuous courtesans as seen in the romantic literature that Henri is familiar with, such as Victor Hugo's 1829 play Marion de Lorme. Amused by Pauline's deception and intent on marrying Genevieve, Montrichard promises not to betray his former lover's secret.

Henri happens upon Pauline and Montrichard. The latter plays into the persona that Pauline has created and leaves for his "duel" with Baudel.

The couple are joined by the Marquis, the Marquise and Genevieve. Henri's family is happy to see him, but the Marquis is dismayed to learn that he has married without their permission. Pauline overcomes the family's apprehensions first pretending that she is the humble daughter of farmers, then by claiming that her father fought alongside the Marquis in the Vendée. The Marquis joyfully decides to accept Pauline into the family, and invites the couple to their hotel.

Pauline attempts to assuage Henri's doubts about her intentions. After he reveals that he feels guilty lying to the Marquis and Marquise about Pauline's past, she promises that they will leave soon after seeing them that evening. Out of Henri's hearing, Pauline savors the title of countess.

=== Act II ===
The characters are next seen at the Marquis and Marquise's home in Vienna. A significant amount of time has passed, and Pauline has evidently not kept her promise to Henri. Pauline has become languid after growing bored with life as a respectable aristocrat, leading some of the family members to believe that she is unwell and displeased with the frivolity of aspects of society life.

Before they leave for a party thrown in Pauline's honor, the Marquise and Marquise depart to give clandestine charity to the poor, a task that Pauline finds pointless if not done for the sake of earning public approval. In the absence of the couple, Pauline initiates a heart-to-heart with Genevieve, who reveals that she has no desire to marry. Over the course of the conversation, Genevieve confesses that she keeps a diary in a drawer that can only be opened with a golden key. Genevieve eventually admits that she would marry a man that she was betrothed to at birth, but that prospect has come to naught.

Baudel visits the home, and Genevieve departs to dress for the party. Baudel, intending to seduce Pauline, attempts to curry favor with her by presenting her with a diamond necklace, having been advised by Montrichard that aristocratic women fall for men if given jewelry by them. Henri happens upon the pair, and is told that Pauline bought the necklace, and that the two were deliberating whether or not it was made of paste. After Baudel departs, Henri confesses to Pauline that he sees through her deception, and realizes that she has married him for his title, but refuses to grant her a separation due to his principles regarding marriage and respectability.

Genevieve enters and Pauline retires to dress after briefly teasing Genevieve about her apprehensions regarding marriage. As Pauline leaves, she realizes that Henri was Genevieve's betrothed. Genevieve dismisses Pauline's remarks. Henri is moved by his relative's reflections upon married life and secretly wishes he had married her.

The entrance of Irma, Pauline's mother, is announced by a servant. After, Genevieve rushes to inform Pauline of the good news, Henri bribes Irma into leaving after a day. Irma meets the Marquis and Marquise, and is forced to pretend that she is an innocent Breton peasant woman, rather than a dissolute city-dweller. Pauline is excused from the party, and she joyfully reunites with her mother.

Along with Montrichard and a comic actor, Adolphe, Irma and Pauline have a raucous party. After a drunken Adolphe begins to sob over his debts, Pauline gives him her necklace's pearl clasp. Afterwards, Irma scolds her for discarding such an expensive item. As the party draws to a close, Pauline becomes determined to separate from Henri. Irma and Pauline leave for another room, in which Irma reads Pauline's future.

=== Act III ===
Pauline reveals to Montrichard that she plans to leave Henri for Baudel, who is staying in Nice, France while he awaits Pauline's arrival. Pauline will remain in Vienna for a brief time to settle the terms of her separation.

Genevieve encourages her parents to take the family to Rome, as she claims that she dislikes living in Vienna.

Adolphe returns and offers the pearl clasp to the Marquis and Marquise. He tells them that it was given him by the Countess de Puyingens, but that after he visited a jeweler he realized that she evidently did not know its worth. In the meantime, Genevieve sets about looking for her golden key, as it is missing. Adolphe is rewarded by the Marquis, who comes to the conclusion that actors are not inherently lacking in virtue due to their profession.

The Marquis and Marquise decide to gently humiliate Pauline for her duplicity, but when they reveal the worth of the necklace in front of Henri, he denounces Pauline as an adultress. The Marquis and the Marquise chastise Henri for his brutal reaction, but he then reveals that Pauline is the courtesan Olympe Taverny. Pauline demands a separation on her terms and blackmails the Marquis with extracts from Genevieve's diary, detailing her love for Henri and his love for her. The extracts reveal that Henri believes that Pauline has tuberculosis and hopes that she will die, leaving him free to marry Genevieve, who wishes that Henri would eschew such thoughts. Genevieve, who was also operating under the assumption that Pauline was ill, wanted to travel to Rome in order to cure her. The Marquis shoots Pauline dead in order to preserve the reputation of his loved ones. The play ends as he reloads the gun.

== Reception ==
In Gordon Ray Young's 1915 study of several French plays for the Los Angeles Times, he gives Olympe's Marriage special attention. He compares it favorably to the 1893 drama The Second Mrs. Tanqueray, before finally coming to the conclusion that Augier's play, and not Pinero's, is a more realistic consideration of the "fallen woman question".

In 1977, the drama was revived at Manhattan Playhouse. The Peninsula Times Tribune gave the production a mixed review. The critic, Blake Maxam, praised Nancy Jo Banko in the role of Pauline, Mary Lynn Gardner as Genevieve, Jack Alexander as Baron de Montrichard, and Marian Sinton as Irma. Maxam finds the text itself deficient, as he does not believe Henri and his family likeable enough to engender an audience's dislike of Pauline.
