= Osvaldo =

- Language: Spanish, Portuguese, Italian

Other names
- Nicknames: Ozzie, Waldo, Oswald, Ossie

Osvaldo may refer to the following people:

== Given name ==
- Osvaldo Alonso (born 1985), a Cuban football player
- Osvaldo Ardiles (born 1952), an Argentine football player and coach
- Osvaldo Bagnoli (born 1935), an Italian football coach
- Osvaldo Bido (born 1995), a Dominican baseball player
- Osvaldo Brandão (1916–1989), a Brazilian football coach
- Osvaldo Canobbio (born 1973), a Uruguayan football player
- Osvaldo Cavandoli (1920–2007), an Italian cartoonist
- Osvaldo Cochrane Filho (1933–2020), a Brazilian water polo player
- Osvaldo Coluccino (born 1963), an Italian composer
- Osvaldo Díaz (born 1981), a Paraguayan football player
- Osvaldo Dorticós Torrado (1919–1983), a Cuban politician who served as President of Cuba from 1959–1976
- Osvaldo Fernández (born 1968), a Cuban professional baseball player
- Osvaldo Golijov (born 1960), a Grammy award winning composer of classical music
- Osvaldo Hurtado (born 1939), President of Ecuador from 1981–1984
- Osvaldo Jeanty (born 1983), a Haitian-Canadian basketball player
- Osvaldo Lara (1955–2024), a Cuban track and field sprinter
- Osvaldo Lima, São Tomé and Príncipe football player and coach
- Osvaldo Luiz Vital (born 1959), a Brazilian football player
- Osvaldo Martinez (disambiguation), several people
- Osvaldo Miranda (disambiguation), several people
- Osvaldo Nieves (born 1980), a Puerto Rican track and field athlete
- Osvaldo Núñez (born 1938), a member of the Canadian House of Commons from 1993–1997
- Osvaldo Peralta (born 1971), a Paraguayan football defender
- Osvaldo Pugliese (1905–1995), an Argentine tango musician
- Osvaldo Ribó (1927–2015), Argentine tango singer
- Osvaldo Ríos (born 1960), Puerto Rican actor, model, singer, and guitarist
- Osvaldo Rodríguez (disambiguation), several people
- Osvaldo Soriano (1943–1997), an Argentine journalist and writer
- Osvaldo Sosa (1945–2020), an Argentine footballer and manager
- Osvaldo Suárez (1934–2018), an Argentine long-distance runner
- Osvaldo Terranova (1923–1984), an Argentine film actor
- Osvaldo Valenti (1906–1945), an Italian film actor
- Osvaldo Zavala Giler, an Ecuadorian jurist
- Osvaldo Zubeldía (1927–1982), an Argentine football player and coach
- Cristian Osvaldo Álvarez (born 1978), an Argentine football player
- Osvaldo Lourenço Filho (born 1987), a Brazilian football player

== Surname ==
- Dani Osvaldo (born 1986), Italian footballer

== Other ==
- Osvaldo Vieira International Airport
