= Lidia Desmond =

Argentine actress, vedette, and singer

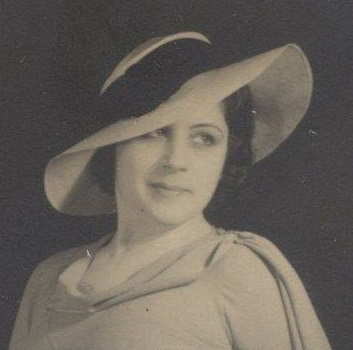
Lidia Desmond

Lidia Desmond (1907 in Buenos Aires – ? in ibid) was an Argentine actress, vedette, and singer.

== Career ==
Desmond was a tango singer. With her sister, Violeta Desmond, they formed a popular duo in the 1930s and 1940s known as Las Hermanas Desmond (The Sisters Desmond). They performed with the orchestra of Juan Canaro, including the waltz Love is to love in 1934, and afterwards with Pedro Maffia. The Desmond sisters were among the first tango duos, alongside contemporaries Nelly Omar and Gory Omar, Margot Dwell and Myrna Dwell, Ethel Torres and Meggi Torres, among others. Both were soubrettes. However, Desmond had a lower register than her sister and was a better interpreter of tango. In 1935, the sisters became a vocal female trio adding another sibling, Indiana Desmond. With Julio De Caro's orchestra, the sang the tango as Pienso en tí (1936) in Odeon. They worked in the Gran Teatro Opera, performing in The evolution of the tango of 1870 to 1936, with Héctor Palaces, Hugo del Carril, Pedro Lauga, Mary Capdevila, and others. Desmond's acting debut occurred in 1926, under the direction of Arturo Of Bassi. She acted in numerous venues, including Maipo, Porteño, Ideal, May, Avenue and Sarmiento. She performed alongside Manuel Romero, Alberto Soifer, Elvino Vardaro, Juan Carlos Thorry, Rudy Ayala and Gloria Guzmán. She was also a regular on the Municipal Radio, Argentinian Radio, Irradiate Prieto, Irradiate Belgrano and Irradiate Stentor. In Radius Callao, Desmond worked with Olga Casares Pearson, Ángel Walk, Francisco Lomuto, Paquita Waiter, Sabina Elms and Eva Paci.

== Filmography ==
1936: Radio Bar, with Gloria Guzmán, Olinda Bozán, Alicia Barrié, Alberto Vila, Marcos Caplán, Sussy Derqui, José Ramírez, Benita Puértolas, Héctor Quintanilla, Carlos Enríquez and Juan Mangiante.
