= Amanda Varela =

Argentine actress (1911–2000)

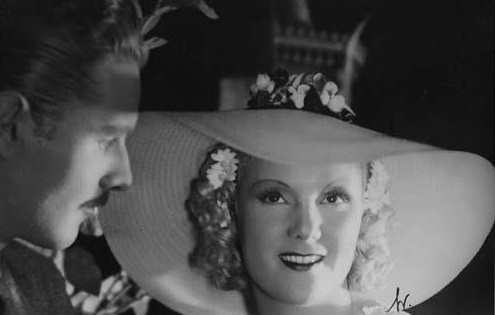
- Born: Amanda Varela Domínguez; 24 October 1911; Buenos Aires, Argentina
- Died: 1 July 2000 (aged 88); Los Angeles, California
- Occupations: actress, judge
- Years active: 1920-1980

Amanda Varela was an Argentine actress who primarily worked during the Golden Age of Argentine Cinema, performing on stage and in films of Argentina and the US. She made 9 films in Argentina and 2 in the US and appeared on stage in numerous productions in both countries. Varela is usually credited with helping her sister, Mecha Ortiz, secure her first acting roles. In the 1950s, Varela retired from acting, moved to the United States, and became a matrimonial judge.

== Biography ==
Amanda Varela Domínguez was born on 24 October 1911 in Buenos Aires, Argentina. She was the younger sister of Mecha Ortiz, yet had already made a name for herself when Ortiz embarked on an acting career. Varela helped Ortiz secure a screen test with Paramount Studios of France and introduced her to a friend, film critic Chas de Cruz, who helped Ortiz secure a her first film role as "Rubia Mireya", in the classic Los muchachos de antes no usaban gomina directed by Manuel Romero.

By 1930, Varela had acted in her first role on film, La canción del gaucho, which was produced by Chas de Cruz under the direction of José A. Ferreyra and starring María Turgenova and Arturo Forte, among others. On stage in 1934, Varela was performing in Baile en el Savoy with Florencio Parravicini but had to withdraw due to illness and was replaced by Amelia Bence. She came back to the stage in 1935 to star in a controversial role in Romeo y Julieta and later that same year had better success in the role of Pepita Giménez in the musical comedy La payariega with Pedro Quartucci, Miguel Faust Rocha, Eleonora Boemer, and Dora Martínez at the Teatro Avenida. She made several films in the late 1930s, including Melgarejo (1937), ¡Segundos afuera! (1937), La chismosa (1938), and Papá soltero (1939), which earned her sufficient reputation that an invitation to Hollywood was issued. In 1939, her first US film was made, El otro soy yo, under the direction of Richard Harlan and starring Tito Guízar, Renee Torres, Pilar Arcos, and Martin Garralaga.

She was hired by Luis G. Basurto who was directing a company of actors called "Teatro Popular de México" that were working at the Mayan Theatre in Los Angeles. Varela also participated in several plays in the United States, including: Tovarich directed by Mark Ranhar, El escándalo de la verdad, Miércoles de cenizas, and Cada quien su vida. By 1942, she was performing as a singer and also had secured a role in the US film, The Falcon's Brother, for which she drew good reviews. She returned to Argentina and appeared in the film Mi novia es un fantasma (1944 ). The following year, she performed at the Teatro Nacional Cervantes in the debut of Tierra extraña, by Roberto Alejandro Vagni, which would later be made into a film of the same name. Varela starred in the 1946 film, La tía de Carlos, along with Pedro Quartucci, Rodolfo Francisco Alvarez, and Pedro Maratea. In the 1947 stage production of Luna de miel para tres, Varela starred with Mexican actors Gloria Marín and Jorge Negrete. She made her last film, El diablo de las vidalas, in 1950.

Varela moved to the states, retired from performing, and became a judge, specifically working in marriages. She died on 1 July 1, 2000 in Los Angeles, California.

== Filmography ==
Year	Title	Role	Notes
1930	La canción del gaucho		
1937	Melgarejo	Invitada 6	
1937	¡Segundos afuera!		
1938	La chismosa		
1939	Papá soltero	Marta Cortez / Teresa	
1940	El otro soy yo		
1942	The Falcon's Brother	Carmela	
1944	Mi novia es un fantasma		Uncredited
1950	El diablo de las vidalas		
1952	La tía de Carlos		
