= Pedro Mata =

Pedro Mata may refer to:

- Pedro Mata y Ripollés (1878-1846), Spanish medical doctor and politician.
- Pedro Mata y Fontanet (1811-1877), Spanish medical, writer and politician doctor.
- Pedro Mata y Domínguez (1875-1946), Spanish writer.
