= Los Muchachos de antes no usaban gomina =

Los muchachos de antes no usaban gomina may refer to:

- The Boys Didn't Wear Hair Gel Before (1937 film), an Argentine historical drama film
- The Boys Didn't Wear Hair Gel Before (1969 film), an Argentine drama film
