= Gloria Guzmán =

Spanish-born Argentine vedette and actress (1902–1979)

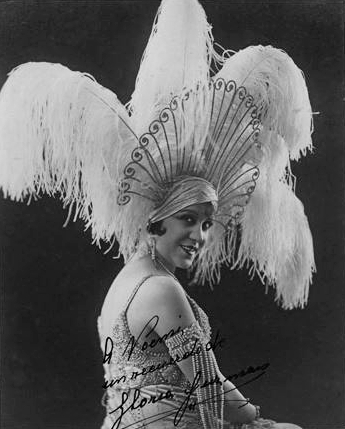
- Gloria Guzmán 1926
- Born: 15 April 1902; Vitoria, Álava, Spain
- Died: 18 September 1979 (aged 77); Buenos Aires, Argentina
- Occupations: actress, vedette
- Years active: 1920s–1950s

Gloria Guzmán (1902–1979) was a Spanish-born Argentine vedette and actress who performed in the early Argentine theater and Buenos Aires revue.

== Biography ==
Gloria Guzmán was born on 15 April 1902 (or possibly 1894) in Vitoria, Alava, Spain. She arrived in Argentina in 1924 with a zarzuela company and had her debut in the play Las camisas negras. By 1926, she was dubbed as one of the three great "Bataclanas" (showgirls)of the Maipo Theater along with Carmen Lamas and Iris Marga.

In 1931, she began making films debuting in Luces de Buenos Aires with Sofía Bozán and Pedro Quartucci. That same year, she starred in Un caballero de frac directed by Roger Capellani and Carlos San Martín with Roberto Rey and Rosita Díaz Gimeno.

In 1936, she filmed Radio Bar directed by Manuel Romero with starring alongside Olinda Bozán and Carmen Lamas. Cuatro corazones (1939) directed by Miguel Gómez Bao and Carlos Schliepper paired her with Irma Córdoba, Herminia Franco and Eduardo Sandrini.

Guzmán had her own theater company sometimes working alone as "Compañia Argentina de Comedia Gloria Guzmán" as she did for the 1941 staging of “Julio Sandoval candidato a concejal” by Armando Moock and sometimes in tandem with others. In 1945, her "Compañía de Gloria Guzmán y Juan Carlos Thorry" put on three plays: “No salgas esta noche” by Sixto Pondal Ríos and Carlos Olivari, “Mi Amor es un león” by Lazlo Fodor, and “Los maridos engañan de 7 a 9” by Ríos and Olivari. The following season she and Thorry went on the road touring in Mexico and then Spain through the end of 1947.

In 1954, she returned to film, starring in Tren internacional directed by Daniel Tinayre with Mirtha Legrand and Alberto Closas and the following year Guzmán made Pájaros de cristal under the direction of Ernesto Arancibia with Mecha Ortiz and Alba Arnova.

Guzman filmed two films in the 1960s: Yo quiero vivir contigo (1960) and María M. (1964) and her last two films in the 1970s: Disputas en la cama (1972) and La conquista del paraíso which was filmed in 1979 and 1980 released in 1981, after Guzmán's death.

Guzmán died on 18 September 1979 in Buenos Aires.

== Filmography ==
- The Lights of Buenos Aires (1931)
- A Gentleman in Tails (1931)
- Radio Bar (1936)
- Cuatro corazones (1939)
- Tren internacional (1954)
- Pájaros de cristal (1955)
- Yo quiero vivir contigo (1960)
- María M. (1964)
- Disputas en la cama (1972)
- La conquista del paraíso (1980)
