= Dora Gález =

Argentine actress and vedette

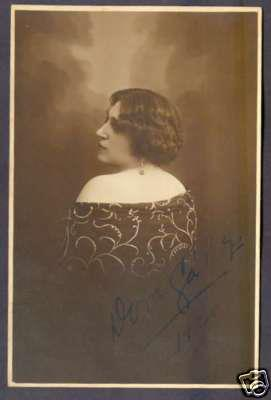
- Born: 1903; Argentina
- Died: 2002; Argentina
- Occupation(s): actress, vedette
- Years active: 1920s–1950s

Dora Gález (1903–2002) was a pioneering Argentine actress and vedette. She was one of the first stars of the Maipo Theater, and given the title of the "nightingale of the house". Other early co-stars with whom she worked were Carmen Lamas, Gloria Guzmán and Tita Merello. In 1924, she was in the cast of Roberto L. Cayol's Revue ¿Quién dijo miedo? which featured music by Arturo De Bassi along with Iris Marga, César Fiaschi, Carmen Lamas, and the debut performance of Tita Merello.

In 1926, she was the star of the revue Francisquita, la maleva (1926), in which she sang with Jaime Moreno and performed with the actors Héctor Calcaño playing the role of Curiando and Miguel Gómez Bao playing the role of Carmona.

She was married to the Italian actor Eduardo Amoroso.
