= Antonia Herrero =

Argentine actress

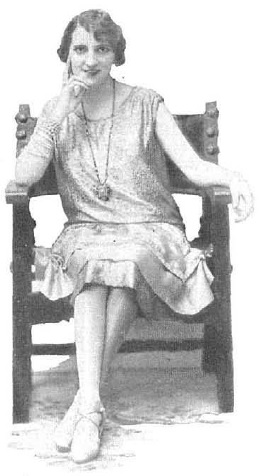
- Herrero in 1926
- Born: 27 November 1897; Kingdom of Spain
- Died: 11 April 1978 (aged 80); Buenos Aires, Argentina
- Occupation: Actress
- Years active: 1944–1973
- Spouse: Francisco López Silva (m. 1912)
- Children: Marisa Herrero

Antonia Herrero ( 27 November 1897 – 11 April 1978) was a Spanish-born Argentinian film actress.

Herrero began acting in theater in Spain. At age 17 Herrero debuted in El adversario at the Avenida Theatre in Buenos Aires Herrero later moved to Argentina where she acted in the Argentine cinema from 1944 to 1973.

== Personal life ==
At age 15, Herrero married the 32 year old Spanish-born Argentinian actor Francisco López Silva. Their daughter was the actress Marisa Herrero.

== Filmography ==
=== Film ===
Year	Title	Role	Notes	Ref(s)
1944	La Dama duende			
1946	Rosa de América			
1947	A Sangre Fría	Sabina Zani		
1948	Recuerdos de un ángel			
1948	Las Aventuras de Jack			
1951/1952	La corona negra			
1951	La de los ojos color del tiempo			
1952	Deshonra	Directora		
1952	La Muerte en las calles			
1954	El Grito sagrado			
1955	Reportaje a un cadáver		Not released	
1955	Pájaros de cristal			
1955	El Mal amor			
1956	El Hombre virgen			
1956	"'Estrellas de Buenos Aires			
1957	El Hombre Señalado			
1963	Las ratas (película de 1963)			
1963	Placeres conyugales	Antonia		
1971	Embrujo de amor			
1972/1973	Vení conmigo			

=== Stage ===
Year	Title	Role	Venue	Notes	Ref(s)
c.1914	El adversario (French: L'Adversaire)		Avenida Theatre	Play by Alfred Capus and Emmanuel Arène	
1945	The House of Bernarda Alba	Poncia	Avenida Theatre	World Premiere	
1950	The House of Bernarda Alba	Poncia	Teatro de Ensayo La Carátula	Spanish Premiere	
