= Ernesto Arancibia =

Argentine film director and screenwriter (1904–1963)

- Born: 12 January 1904; Buenos Aires, Argentina
- Died: 27 August 1963 (aged 59); Buenos Aires, Argentina
- Occupations: Film director and screenwriter

Ernesto Arancibia (12 January 1904 – 27 August 1963) was an Argentine film director and screenwriter, notable for his work during the classical era of Argentine cinema. He was one of the founders of the Directores Argentinos Cinematográficos (DAC) in 1958.

== Filmography ==
=== As director ===
- La novia (1961)
- Azafatas con permiso (1959)
- Y después del cuplé (1959)
- La pícara soñadora (1956)
- Pájaros de cristal (1955)
- La mujer desnuda (1955)
- La calle del pecado (1954)
- The Lady of the Camellias (1953)
- The Orchid (1951)
- Romance en tres noches (1950)
- María de los Ángeles (1948)
- La gran tentación (1948)
- Musical Romance (1947)
- Mirad los lirios del campo (1947)
- Lauracha (1946)
- Casa de muñecas (1943)
- Su primer baile (1942)

=== As screenwriter ===
- Queen of the Tabarin Club (1960)
- Pájaros de cristal (1955)
- La calle del pecado (1954)
- La mujer de las camelias (1954)
