= Blanca Vidal =

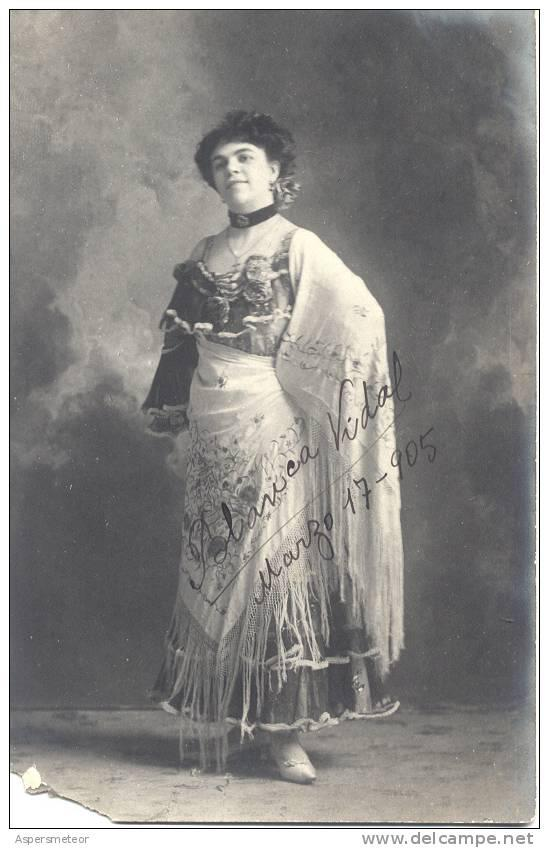
- Born: Blanca Vidal Cano; 4 March 1885; Bilbao, Spain
- Died: 8 September 1962 (aged 77); Buenos Aires, Argentina
- Occupation: Actress

Blanca Vidal Cano (4 March 1885 – 8 September 1962) was a Spanish-born actress who mainly performed in Argentine theater and films.

== Biography ==
Blanca Vidal was born in Bilbao on 4 March 1885, the daughter of journalist and dramatist Camilo Vidal. From a very young age, she traveled abroad, where she performed prominent roles in countries such as Uruguay, Chile, and Argentina.

She made her debut at the Teatro Cibils in Montevideo in 1901, with the play Las tentaciones de San Antonio. She was a star highly acclaimed by the public for her good diction and interpretative quality.

She studied teaching, graduating from a normal school in Montevideo, and then went on to teach for two years in Buenos Aires. She was also a member of numerous planning-related committees. Her sister Emilia Vidal was also an actress.

Blanca Vidal died in Buenos Aires on 8 September 1962.

== Career ==
=== Theater ===
She was part of the Podestá-Vittone Company (an association between José J. Podestá and Luis Vittone), together with Blanca Podestá, Aparicio Podestá, Olinda Bozán, Segundo Pomar, and Berta Gangloff. In 1911, she became a member of the Pablo Podestá National Company, directed by José J. Podestá, sharing scenes with Lea Conti, Elías Alippi, Aurelia Ferrer, and Jacinta Diana.

In 1922, she joined the Blanca Podestá company, appearing in the play La enemiga by Dario Niccodemi, together with José Casamayor, and Miguel Faust Rocha.

In 1927, she was a member of The Podestá-Alippi Theater Company, performing at the Teatro Smart together with Juan Bono.

She worked in theaters such as the Teatro Apolo, the Teatro Nacional Cervantes, the Teatro Moderno, and the Teatro Nacional.

In 1948, she joined the Blanca Podestá Theater Company, with which she performed La enemiga, along with a cast including Mario Danesi, Elisardo Santalla, Manolita Serra, Amalia Britos, Pedro Aleandro, Américo Acosta Machado, Alfredo Distasio, and Jorge de la Riestra.

==== Plays ====
- Las tentaciones de San Antonio (1901)
- En el fuego (1910)
- Historia gaucha (1910)
- Todos por ellas (1910)
- Las romerías (1910)
- Pavesi (1910)
- Don Costa, Fraile (1910)
- El presidiario (1910)
- El final de una tragedia (1910)
- Alma sajona (1910)
- La última carta (1910)
- El Centenario (1910)
- La vida inútil (1910)
- 1810 (1910)
- El circo (1910)
- Eclipse de sol (1910)
- La criolla (1910)
- Cerisette (1910)
- Boletos de recreo (1910)
- El sitio de Buenos Aires (1910)
- A la luz de la luna (1910)
- La viuda loca (1910)
- Derecho de amar (1910)
- Después de misa (1910)
- Las condenadas (1910)
- * Tierra virgen (1910)
- Flores frescas (1910)
- Canto triste (1910)
- Vivir de arriba (1910)
- La seca (1911)
- El indio (1911)
- La nota roja (1911)
- Barranca abajo (1911)
- El tapao (1911; directed by Pablo Podestá)
- El calendario que perdió siete días
- La enemiga (1922)

=== Filmography ===
- 1925: Manuelita Rosas
- 1937: Melgarejo
- 1942: Claro de luna
- 1943: Candida, Woman of the Year
- 1944: Romance de medio siglo
- 1945: Saint Candida
- 1945: A Woman of No Importance
- 1950: Nacha Regules
