= Derqui =

Derqui is a surname. Notable people with the surname include:

- Pablo Derqui (born 1976), Spanish actor
- Santiago Derqui (1809–1867), Argentine politician
- Susy Derqui (died after 1955), Argentine actress and cabaret performer
