= List of stage names: F =

This list of stage names lists names used by those in the entertainment industry, alphabetically by their stage name's surname (or the best approximation) followed by the given name (or the best approximation) where the surname begins with "F". One-word stage names are presented in List of one-word stage names.

| Stage name | Birth name | Life | Notability | Notes |
|---|---|---|---|---|
| Christiane F. | Christiane Vera Felscherinow | 1962– | German actress and musician | |
| Inez Fabbri | Agnes Schmidt | 1831–1909 | Austrian opera singer | |
| Lara Fabian | Lara Sophie Katy Crokaert | 1970– | Belgian-Canadian pop singer and songwriter | |
| Bent Fabric | Bent Fabricius-Bjerre | 1924–2020 | Danish musician and composer | |
| Radical Face | Ben Cooper | 1982– | American singer-songwriter | |
| Tape Face | Sam Wills | 1978– | New Zealand prop comic, busker and clown | |
| Douglas Fairbanks | Douglas Elton Thomas Ullman | 1883–1939 | American actor and filmmaker | |
| Morgan Fairchild | Patsy Ann McClenny | 1950– | American actress | |
| Virginia Brown Faire | Virginia Cecelia Labuna | 1904–1980 | American actress | |
| Marion Fairfax | Marion Neiswanger | 1875–1970 | American screenwriter, playwright, actress and producer | |
| Adam Faith | Terence Nelhams Wright | 1940–2003 | English singer and actor | |
| Paloma Faith | Paloma Faith Blomfield | 1981– | English singer and actress | |
| EagleBones Falconhawk | Ian Fowles | 1979– | American musician, author and actor (The Aquabats) | |
| Lee Falk | Leon Gross | 1911–1999 | American cartoonist and writer | |
| Rossella Falk | Rosa Falzacappa | 1926–2013 | Italian actress | |
| Matt Fallon | Matthew Frankel | 1965– | American singer (Skid Row and Anthrax) | |
| Georgie Fame | Clive Powell | 1943– | English musician and singer (Georgie Fame and the Blue Flames) | |
| Semyon Farada | Semyon Ferdman | 1933–2009 | Russian actor | |
| Don Fardon | Don Maughm | 1940– | English pop singer | |
| James Farentino | James Ferrantino | 1938–2012 | American actor | |
| Annie Fargé | Henriette Goldfarb | 1934–2011 | French actress | |
| Donna Fargo | Yvonne Vaughan | 1945– | American country singer-songwriter and author | |
| Felicia Farr | Olive Dines | 1932– | American former actress and model | |
| Jamie Farr | Jameel Joseph Farah | 1934– | American actor and comedian | |
| Gia Farrell | Jeannie Bocchicchio | 1989– | American singer-songwriter | Also known as Bokeeks |
| Henry Farrell | Charles Farrell Myers | 1920–2006 | American novelist and screenwriter | |
| Nicholas Farrell | Nicholas Frost | 1955– | English actor | |
| Perry Farrell | Peretz Bernstein | 1959– | American singer, songwriter and musician (Jane's Addiction) | |
| Sharon Farrell | Sharon Lee Forsmoe | 1940–2023 | American actress | |
| Suzanne Farrell | Roberta Sue Ficker | 1945– | American ballerina | |
| Terry Farrell | Theresa Lee Farrell Grussendorf | 1963– | American actress and model | |
| Timothy Farrell | Timothy Sperl | 1922–1989 | American actor | |
| Hussein Fatal | Bruce Washington Jr. | 1973–2015 | American rapper (Outlawz) | |
| Minnesota Fats | Rudolf Wanderone Jr. | 1913–1996 | Swiss-American professional billiards player | |
| Dorothy Fay | Dorothy Fay Southworth | 1915–2003 | American actress | |
| Frank Fay | Francis Donner | 1891–1961 | American vaudeville comedian and actor | |
| Alice Faye | Alice Leppert | 1915–1998 | American actress and singer | |
| Frances Faye | Frances Cohen | 1912–1992 | American cabaret singer and musician | |
| Joey Faye | Joseph Palladino | 1909–1997 | American actor and comedian | |
| Frank Faylen | Frank Ruf | 1905–1985 | American actor | |
| Tim Feild | Richard Timothy Feild | 1934–2016 | English mystic, author, spiritual teacher and musician | Later known as Reshad Feild |
| Zé Felipe | José Felipe Rocha Costa | 1998– | Brazilian singer | |
| Freddy Fender | Baldemar Garza Huerta | 1937–2006 | American musician | Also known as El Bebop Kid and Scotty Wayne |
| Fania Fénelon | Fanja Goldstein | 1908–1983 | French musician, composer, cabaret singer, Holocaust survivor and author | |
| Tony Fenton | Anthony Fagan | 1961–2015 | Irish radio presenter and DJ | |
| Franck Fernandel | Franck Gérard Ignace Contandin | 1935–2011 | French actor and singer-songwriter | |
| Lolo Ferrari | Eve Valois | 1963–2000 | French dancer, actress and singer | |
| Jean Ferrat | Jean Tenenbaum | 1930–2010 | French singer-songwriter and poet | |
| Audrey Ferris | Audrey Kellar | 1909–1990 | American actress | |
| Stepin Fetchit | Lincoln Perry | 1902–1985 | American comedian and actor | |
| Cy Feuer | Seymour Feuerman | 1911–2006 | American producer, director, composer and musician | |
| Jacques Feyder | Jacques Frédérix | 1885–1948 | Belgian actor, screenwriter and film director | |
| Lupe Fiasco | Wasalu Jaco | 1982– | American rapper and record producer | |
| Fabri Fibra | Fabrizio Tarducci | 1976– | Italian rapper | |
| Shirley Anne Field | Shirley Broomfield | 1936–2023 | English actress | |
| Fenella Fielding | Fenella Feldman | 1927–2018 | English actress | |
| Janet Fielding | Janet Mahoney | 1953– | Australian actress | |
| Jerry Fielding | Joshua Feldman | 1922–1980 | American musician and film composer | Also known as Gerald Feldman and Jerry Feldman |
| Romaine Fielding | William Blandin | 1867–1927 | American actor, screenwriter and film director | |
| Gracie Fields | Grace Stansfield | 1898–1979 | English actress, comedienne and singer | |
| Irving Fields | Yitzhak Schwartz | 1915–2016 | American musician | |
| Lew Fields | Moses Schoenfeld | 1867–1941 | American actor, comedian and performer | |
| Stanley Fields | Walter Agnew | 1883–1941 | American actor | |
| Totie Fields | Sophie Feldman | 1930–1978 | American comedienne | |
| W.C. Fields | William Claude Dukenfield | 1880–1946 | American actor, comedian and performer | |
| Five for Fighting | Vladimir John Ondrasik III | 1965– | American singer-songwriter and musician | |
| Dani Filth | Daniel Davey | 1973– | English singer (Cradle of Filth) | |
| Larry Fine | Louis Feinberg | 1902–1975 | American comedian, actor and musician (The Three Stooges) | |
| Johnnie Fingers | John Moylett | 1956– | Irish musician (The Boomtown Rats) | |
| George Finn | Giorgi Agiashvili | 1990– | Georgian-American actor | |
| Larry Finnegan | John Finneran | 1938–1973 | American pop singer | |
| Melanie Fiona | Melanie Hallim | 1983– | Canadian singer and songwriter | Also known as Syren Hall |
| Ricky Fitness | Richard Falomir | 1976– | American musician and composer (The Aquabats) | |
| Barry Fitzgerald | William Shields | 1888–1961 | Irish actor | |
| Ki Fitzgerald | Kiley McPhail | 1983– | English musician (Busted) | Also known as Azteck |
| Scott Fitzgerald | William McPhail | 1948– | Scottish singer and actor | |
| Walter Fitzgerald | Walter Fitzgerald Bond | 1896–1977 | English character actor | |
| El Flaco | Jaime Agudelo Vidal | 1925–2009 | Colombian comedian and actor | |
| Fannie Flagg | Patricia Neal | 1944– | American actress, writer and comedienne | |
| Golde Flami | Golda Flon | 1918–2007 | Argentine actress | |
| Bud Flanagan | Chaim Weintrop | 1896–1968 | English music hall performer and comedian (Flanagan and Allen) | |
| Joe Flanigan | Joseph Dunnigan III | 1967– | American writer and actor | |
| Grandmaster Flash | Joseph Robert Saddler | 1958– | Barbadian-American DJ and producer (Grandmaster Flash and the Furious Five) | |
| Mr. Flash | Gilles Bousquet | Unknown | French record producer and DJ | |
| Flavor Flav | William Drayton | 1959– | American rapper | |
| Art Fleming | Arthur Fleming Fazzin | 1924–1995 | American actor and television host | |
| Joy Fleming | Erna Raad | 1944–2017 | German singer | |
| Rhonda Fleming | Marilyn Louis | 1923–2020 | American actress | |
| Flesh-n-Bone | Stanley Howse | 1973– | American rapper (Bone Thugs-n-Harmony) | |
| G Flip | Georgia Flipo | 1993– | Australian singer, songwriter and drummer | |
| Alba Flores | Alba González Villa | 1986– | Spanish actress | |
| Klaus Flouride | Geoffrey Lyall | 1949– | American musician (Dead Kennedys) | |
| Dímelo Flow | Jorge Valdés Vázquez | 1989– | Panamanian DJ and producer | |
| Ñengo Flow | Edwin Laureano Rosa Vázquez Ortiz | 1981– | Puerto Rican rapper and singer | |
| Gilly Flower | Gertrude Jacobs | 1908–2001 | English actress | |
| Uncle Floyd | Floyd Vivino | 1951– | American TV host and comedian | |
| Get Cape. Wear Cape. Fly | Sam Duckworth | 1986– | English musician | |
| Barbara Flynn | Barbara McMurray | 1948– | English actress | |
| Dukey Flyswatter | Michael Sonye | 1954– | American actor, screenwriter and musician (Haunted Garage) | |
| Olga Fonda | Olga Tchakova | 1982– | Russian-American actress and model | |
| Mona Fong | Menglan Li | 1934–2017 | Hong Kong television producer | |
| Eddie Fontaine | Edward Reardon | 1927–1992 | American actor and singer | |
| Jacqueline Fontaine | Joyce Romeo | 1927–1995 | American actress and singer | |
| Wayne Fontana | Glyn Ellis | 1945–2020 | English singer (The Mindbenders) | |
| Bryan Forbes | John Clarke | 1926–2013 | English film director, screenwriter, producer, actor and novelist | |
| Mary Forbes | Ethel Young | 1883–1974 | English-American actress | |
| Gail Force | Heidi Beeson | 1966– | American pornographic actress | |
| Bette Ford | Harriet Elizabeth Dingeldein | 1927– | American actress, model and professional bullfighter | |
| Colt Ford | Jason Brown | 1969– | American singer, rapper, songwriter and former professional golfer | |
| Emile Ford | Michael Miller | 1937–2016 | Saint Lucian singer and sound engineer | |
| Francis Ford | Francis Feeney | 1881–1953 | American actor, writer and director | |
| Frankie Ford | Francis Guzzo | 1939–2015 | American singer | |
| John Ford | John Feeney | 1894–1973 | American film director | |
| Mary Ford | Colleen Summers | 1924–1977 | American singer and musician (Les Paul and Mary Ford) | |
| Paul Ford | Paul Ford Weaver | 1901–1976 | American character actor | |
| Wallace Ford | Samuel Grundy Jones | 1898–1966 | English-American vaudevillian and actor | |
| Willa Ford | Amanda Lee Williford | 1981– | American singer, songwriter, dancer, model, television personality and actress | |
| Frank Forest | Forrest Neil Frank | 1896–1976 | American opera singer and actor | |
| George Formby Jr. | George Booth | 1904–1961 | English comedian, actor and musician | |
| George Formby Sr. | James Booth | 1875–1921 | English comedian and singer | |
| Allan Forrest | Allan Forrest Fisher | 1885–1941 | American actor | |
| Helen Forrest | Helen Forrest Fogel | 1917–1999 | American singer | |
| Sally Forrest | Katherine Feeney | 1928–2015 | American actress | |
| Steve Forrest | William Forrest Andrews | 1925–2013 | American actor | |
| John Forsythe | Jacob Freund | 1918–2010 | American actor, producer and narrator | |
| Will Forte | Orville Willis Forte IV | 1970– | American actor, comedian, writer and producer | |
| May Fortescue | Emily May Finney | 1859–1950 | English actress and singer | |
| John Fortune | John Courtney Wood | 1939–2013 | English actor and writer | |
| Dianne Foster | Olga Laruska | 1928–2013 | Canadian actress | |
| Norman Foster | John Hoeffer | 1903–1976 | American film director, screenwriter and actor | |
| Phil Foster | Fivel Feldman | 1913–1985 | American actor and performer | |
| Pops Foster | George Foster | 1892–1969 | American jazz musician | |
| Pete Fountain | Pierre Dewey LaFontaine Jr. | 1930–2016 | American jazz musician | |
| James Fox | William Fox | 1939– | English actor | Also known as James William Fox |
| Oz Fox | Richard Alfonso Martinez | 1961– | American musician (Stryper) | |
| Samantha Fox | Stasia Micula | 1950–2020 | American pornographic actress | |
| Sidney Fox | Sidney Leiffer | 1907–1942 | American actress | |
| Jamie Foxx | Eric Bishop | 1967– | American actor, comedian and singer | |
| John Foxx | Dennis Leigh | 1948– | English musician | |
| Redd Foxx | John Sanford | 1922–1991 | American comedian and actor | |
| Sergio Franchi | Sergio Franci Galli | 1926–1990 | Italian-American singer and actor | |
| Francinette | Hortensia Arnaud | 1901–Unknown year of death | Argentine dancer and actress | |
| Arlene Francis | Arline Francis Kazanjian | 1907–2001 | American actress, radio presenter and television personality | |
| Black Francis | Charles Michael Kittridge Thompson IV | 1965– | American singer, songwriter and musician (Pixies) | Also known as Frank Black |
| Connie Francis | Concetta Franconero | 1937–2025 | American pop singer and actress | |
| Kay Francis | Katharine Gibbs | 1905–1968 | American actress | |
| Don Francisco | Mario Luis Kreutzberger Blumenfeld | 1940– | Chilean-American television personality | |
| Joanna Frank | Johanna Bochco | 1941– | American actress | |
| Joe Franklin | Joseph Fortgang | 1926–2015 | American radio and television personality, author and actor | |
| Dennis Franz | Dennis Franz Schlachta | 1944– | American retired actor | |
| Eduard Franz | Eduard Franz Schmidt | 1902–1983 | American actor | |
| Elizabeth Franz | Betty Frankovich | 1941–2025 | American actress | |
| Liz Fraser | Elizabeth Winch | 1930–2018 | English actress | |
| Phyllis Fraser | Helen Nichols | 1916–2006 | American socialite, writer and actress | |
| Jon Fratelli | John Paul Lawler | 1979– | Scottish musician and singer-songwriter (The Fratellis) | |
| John Fred | John Fred Gourrier | 1941–2005 | American musician | |
| Pauline Frederick | Pauline Libbey | 1883–1938 | American actress | |
| Scott Fredericks | Frederick P. Wehrly | 1943–2017 | Irish actor | |
| Arthur Freed | Arthur Grossman | 1894–1973 | American lyricist and film producer | |
| Jane Freeman | Shirley Pithers | 1935–2017 | Welsh actress | |
| A Fine Frenzy | Alison Sudol | 1984– | American actress and musician | |
| Pierre Fresnay | Pierre Laudenbach | 1897–1975 | French actor | |
| Bobby Friction | Paramdeep Sehdev | 1971– | British DJ and presenter | |
| Fred W. Friendly | Ferdinand Friendly Wachenheimer | 1915–1998 | American radio and TV producer and program creator | |
| Trixie Friganza | Delia O'Callaghan | 1870–1955 | American actress | |
| Willy Fritsch | Wilhelm Egon Fritz Fritsch | 1901–1973 | German actor | |
| Sadie Frost | Sadie Vaughan | 1965– | English actress, producer and fashion designer | |
| Keiko Fuji | Junko Abe | 1951–2013 | Japanese singer and actress | |
| Makoto Fujita | Makoto Harada | 1933–2010 | Japanese actor | |
| Blind Boy Fuller | Fulton Allen | 1904–1941 | American blues musician | |
| Robert Fuller | Leonard Leroy Lee | 1933– | American retired actor | |
| Eileen Fulton | Margaret McLarty | 1933–2025 | American actress | |
| Yvonne Furneaux | Elisabeth Yvonne Scatcherd | 1926–2024 | French-English retired actress | |
| George Furth | George Schweinfurth | 1932–2008 | American playwright and actor | |
| Takumi Furukawa | Iwasaki Takumi | 1917–2018 | Japanese film director | |
| Ed Fury | Rupert Edmund Holovchik | 1928–2023 | American actor and model | |
