= The Man Who Laughed at Love =

- Directed by: Benito Perojo
- Written by: Pedro Mata (novel)
- Cinematography: Arthur Pochet
- Production company: Star Film
- Release date: 15 April 1933
- Country: Spain
- Language: Spanish

The Man Who Laughed at Love (Spanish:El hombre que se reía del amor) is a 1933 Spanish comedy film directed by Benito Perojo. It was made at the Orphea Studios in Barcelona.

== Cast ==
- María Fernanda Ladrón de Guevara
- Rafael Rivelles as Juan Herrero
- Rosita Díaz Gimeno
- Antoñita Colomé
- Ricardo Muñoz
- Gabriel Algara

== Bibliography ==
- Eva Woods Peiró. White Gypsies: Race and Stardom in Spanish Musical Films. U of Minnesota Press, 2012.
