= Hortensia Arnaud =

Argentinian actor and dancer (1901–?)

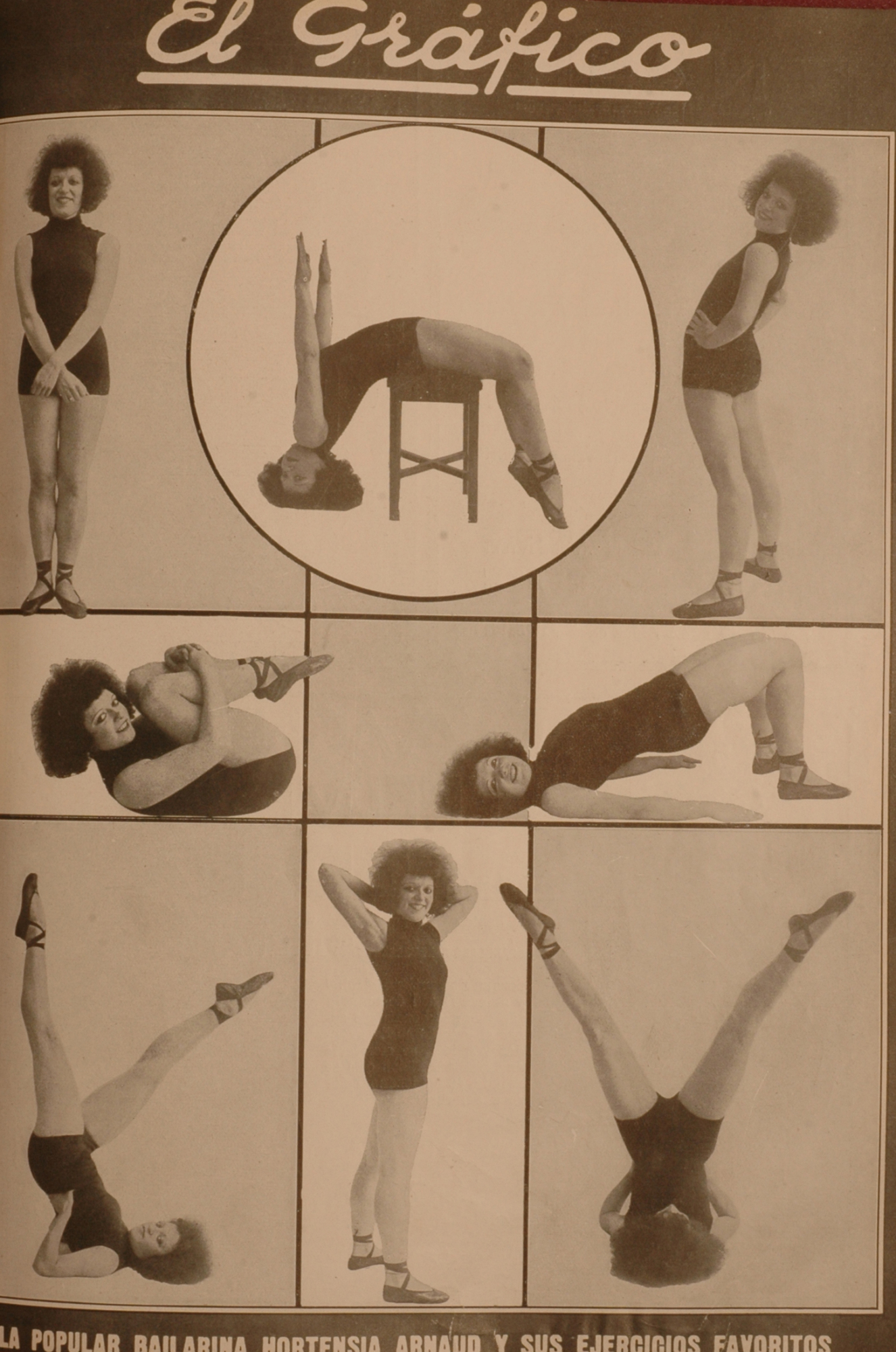
- Hortensia Arnaud (El Gráfico, 21 January 1928)
- Born: July 1, 1901 (age 124); Buenos Aires, Argentina
- Died: Buenos Aires
- Other names: stage name, "Francinette"
- Occupations: dancer; vedette; actress

Hortensia Arnaud (stage name: Francinette; July 1, 1901 - ?) was a pioneering Argentine dancer, vedette, and actress of film and stage during the heyday of cinematography and revue theater. Above all, she was a pioneer bataclana (striptease artist) and premier dancer in Buenos Aires during the 1920s and 1930s.

== Career ==
Born in Buenos Aires, Argentina, from a very young age, Arnaud began to study classical dance. When she began working as a dancer, she adopted the name "Francinette". In her shows, she wore her hair long, and she caused a sensation by dancing without tights and with socks.

An exclusive figure of the Teatro Porteño, she shone in front of Consuelo Velázquez, Ida Lamas, and Ada Falcón, and with actors of the stature of Alfredo Camiña and León Zárate. She worked with writers such as Ivo Pelay, Manuel Romero, and Luis Bayón Herrera. In 1927, while in Chile, she gave an interview, pointing out that she had been acting in theater for nearly six years, her first professional steps having been taken at the Teatro Colón in Buenos Aires. She came to Chile with the Méndez Company and later changed to another, which bore her name (to attract an audience, as she was not the owner), which performed in Valparaíso, at the Victoria Theater. After a health problem, due to overwork, Arnaud returned to Buenos Aires with her mother and started a theater company there. (Note: In the interview, Arnaud stated that she was 19 years old.)

Arnaud was part of the first summer show that premiered at the Teatro Lola Membrives, with the Gran Compañía de Grandes Revistas y Vaudevilles, directed by Carlos Pibernat, Joaquín Pibernat, and Sergio Allen. She worked alongside figures with deep roots in the bataclan such as Tito Lusiardo, Adriana Delhort, and Tita Merello. Arnaud also performed abroad such as in Madrid, Spain at the Círculo de Bellas Artes in 1928.

She died in Buenos Aires on an unknown date.

== Filmography ==
- 1941: La quinta calumnia, with Alí Salem de Baraja and Mario Baroffio

== Theatre ==
- 1927: El Hotel de los enamorados, with la Gran Compañía Nacional de Vaudevilles Musicales, including Lucía Montalvo, Héctor Calcaño, Soledad León, Viviana Díaz de Mendoza, Alicia Vignoli, and Ángela Pasquett
- 1931: Ko Ko Ro Ko with Roberto García Ramos, Carlos Casaravilla, Francisco Chiarello, and Raquel Suárez
- Judía, with Dora Gález, Carmen Lamas, Encarnación Fernández, and Leopoldo Simari

=== Musical theatre ===
- Las chicas del bataclán
- Judía, with Iris Marga, Carmen Lamas, Dora Gález, Encarnación Fernández, and Leopoldo Simari
- Veraneamos en bañadera
- Cien mujeres para un viudo
- Ko Ko Ro Ko (1931) with Carlos Casaravilla, Roberto García Ramos, Francisco Charmiello, and Raquel Suárez
- El hotel de los enamorados (1927), with Héctor Calcaño, Soledad León, Viviana Díaz de Mendoza, Alicia Vignoli, Lucía Montalvo, and Angela Pasquett

== See also ==
- List of dancers
