= El Mal amor =

- Directed by: Luis Mottura
- Written by: Alfredo Ruanova; María Luz Regás
- Release date: 1955
- Running time: 92 minute
- Country: Argentina
- Language: Spanish

El Mal amor is a 1955 Argentine film directed by Luis Mottura.

== Cast ==
- Mecha Ortiz as Marcela
- Ricardo Passano as Rafael
- Pedro Hurtado as Félix Zaldívar
- Antonia Herrero as Emilia Zaldívar
- Vicky Seepol as Marta
- Mateo Martínez as Doctor Sabora
- Nery Smirna as Casilda
- J.P. Lemos as Muchacho
