= Bachelor Father (film) =

- Directed by: Richard Harlan
- Written by: Arthur V. Jones; Gabriel Navarro; Enrique Uthoff; Dana Wilma; Anita Rubio
- Produced by: Dario Faralla
- Starring: Tito Guízar; Amanda Varela; Tana
- Cinematography: Jerome Ash
- Music by: Lud Gluskin
- Production company: Dario Productions
- Distributed by: Paramount Pictures
- Release date: 1939
- Running time: 80 minutes
- Country: United States
- Language: Spanish

Bachelor Father (Spanish: Papá Soltero) is a 1939 American Spanish-language comedy film directed by Richard Harlan and starring Tito Guízar, Amanda Varela and Tana.

== Cast ==
- Tito Guízar as Carlos del Rio
- Amanda Varela as Marta Cortez / Teresa
- Tana as Tana
- Paul Ellis as Cruz Ramos
- Sarita Wooton as Lolita
- Francisco Moreno as Cándido
- Martin Garralaga as Pérez
- Barry Norton as Ricardo
- Raúl Lechuga as Tómas
- Rosa Turich as Romualda
- Carlos Villarías as Buenrostro
- King Wallace as Police Sergeant
- Lucio Villegas as Don Pedro
- José Peña as El sordo
- Carlos Ruffino as Crespo
- Carlos Montalbán as Esteban
- Daniel Rea as Agustín

== Bibliography ==
- Jarvinen, Lisa. The Rise of Spanish-language Filmmaking: Out from Hollywood's Shadow, 1929-1939. Rutger's University Press, 2012.
