= Three Argentines in Paris =

1938 film

- Directed by: Manuel Romero
- Written by: Manuel Romero
- Starring: Florencio Parravicini; Tito Lusiardo; Irma Córdoba
- Cinematography: Francisco Múgica; Luis Romero
- Edited by: Juan Soffici
- Music by: Enrique Delfino 'Delfy'
- Release date: 26 January 1938
- Running time: 90 minutes
- Country: Argentina
- Language: Spanish

Three Argentines in Paris (Spanish:Tres anclados en París) is a 1938 Argentine musical comedy film of the Golden Age of Argentine cinema directed by Manuel Romero and starring Florencio Parravicini, Tito Lusiardo and Irma Córdoba. The film's sets were designed by the art director Ricardo J. Conord.

== Cast ==
- Florencio Parravicini as Domínguez
- Tito Lusiardo as Eustaquio Pedernera
- Irma Córdoba as Ángela Torres
- Enrique Serrano as Eleodoro López
- Hugo del Carril as Ricardo
- Juan Mangiante as Carlos Torres
- Alímedes Nelson as Ketty López
- Elvira Pagã as herself
- Rosina Pagã as herself
- Carlos Morganti
- José Alfayate
- Amalia Bernabé as Argentine tourist in Paris
- Héctor Méndez as Director in assembly

== See also ==
- List of works by Manuel Romero

== Bibliography ==
- Leslie Bethell. A Cultural History of Latin America: Literature, Music and the Visual Arts in the 19th and 20th Centuries. Cambridge University Press, 1998.
