= Song of the Siren (film) =

1948 Mexican film

- Directed by: Norman Foster
- Written by: Edmundo Báez; Álvaro Custodio; Norman Foster
- Starring: Julián Soler; Rosita Díaz Gimeno
- Cinematography: Jack Draper
- Edited by: Gloria Schoemann
- Music by: Manuel Esperón
- Production company: CAFISA
- Release date: 9 April 1948
- Country: Mexico
- Language: Spanish

Song of the Siren (Spanish: El canto de la sirena) is a 1948 Mexican fantasy comedy film directed by Norman Foster and starring Julián Soler and Rosita Díaz Gimeno. It is one of Foster's films made in Mexico. It was produced by CAFISA, and was screened in the United States.

== Plot ==
A composer who writes singing commercials, beachcombing one day, meets and falls in love with Nereida, a mermaid. She is captured and sold to a circus, but the composer finds his way back to her after listening to her in his radio station.

== Cast ==
- Julián Soler
- Rosita Díaz Gimeno
- Rodolfo Acosta
- Mario Caballero
- Tito Junco
- Jesús Maza
- Virginia Serret
- Julio Villarreal

== Bibliography ==
- Porter, Reed (15 June 1949). "'Mermaid' Has Spanish Song". Los Angeles Mirror. p. 44 – via Newspapers.com.
- Berlin, Howard M. (2005). The Complete Mr. Moto Film Phile: A Casebook. Wildside Press LLC. ISBN 978-0-8095-1129-7.
- García Riera, Emilio (1992). Historia documental del cine mexicano: 1946-1948 (in Spanish). Universidad de Guadalajara. ISBN 978-968-895-343-3.
- Ibarra, Jesús (2006). Los Bracho: tres generaciones de cine mexicano (in Spanish). UNAM. ISBN 978-970-32-3074-7.
- Amador, María Luisa; Ayala Blanco, Jorge (1982). Cartelera cinematográfica, 1940-1949 (in Spanish). Universidad Nacional Autónoma de México.
- Biltereyst, Daniel; Maltby, Richard; Meers, Philippe (2019). The Routledge Companion to New Cinema History. Routledge. ISBN 978-1-317-35395-9.
