= Margarita Padín =

Argentine stage and film actress

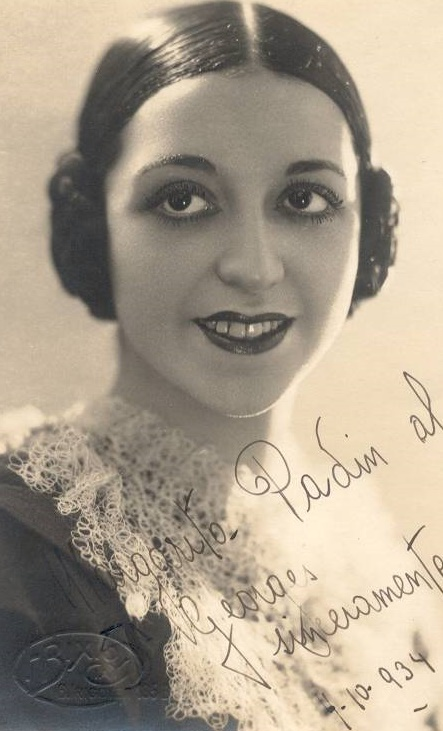
- Padín in 1934
- Born: 8 July 1910; Buenos Aires, Argentina
- Died: 13 August 1993 (aged 83); Buenos Aires, Argentina
- Occupation: Actress
- Years active: 1933-1991 (film)

Margarita Padín (1910–1993) was an Argentine stage and film actress.

== Selected filmography ==
- Dancing (1933)
- Melgarejo (1937)
- Closed Door (1939)
- Mother Gloria (1941)

== Bibliography ==
- Eva Franco. Un siglo de teatro en los ojos de una dama. Francotirador Ediciones, 1998.
