= List of Argentine films of 1957 =

A list of films produced in Argentina in 1957:

Argentine films of 1957
Title	Director	Release	Genre
A - F
Alfonsina	Kurt Land	15 August	
La bestia humana	Daniel Tinayre	12 July	
Las campanas de Teresa	Carlos Schlieper	25 July	
La casa del ángel	Leopoldo Torre Nilsson	11 July	
Cinco gallinas y el cielo	Rubén W. Cavallotti	22 August	
Continente blanco	Bernard Roland	25 July	
La despedida	Miguel Morayta	3 October	
Fantoche	Román Viñoly Barreto	10 October	
G - Z
Historia de una carta	Julio Porter	17 October	
El hombre señalado	Francis Lauric	8 August	
La muerte en las calles	Leo Fleider	30 August	
Los ojos del siglo (Volumen I)	Manuel Peña Rodríguez	26 December	
La sombra de Safo	Julio Porter	5 September	
Todo sea para bien	Carlos Rinaldi	4 May	
Una viuda difícil	Fernando Ayala	18 July	
Venga a bailar el rock	Carlos Marcos Stevani	29 August	

== External links and references ==
- Argentine films of 1957 at the Internet Movie Database
