= Resurrection (1931 Spanish-language film) =

1931 film

- Directed by: Eduardo Arozamena; David Selman
- Screenplay by: Finis Fox
- Spanish adaptation by: Baltasar Fernández Cué
- Based on: Resurrection; 1899 novel by Leo Tolstoy
- Produced by: Paul Kohner; Carl Laemmle Jr.
- Starring: Gilbert Roland; Lupe Vélez; Miguel Faust Rocha; Soledad Jimenez; Amelia Senisterra; Eduardo Arozamena; Blanca de Castejón; Ramón Pereda
- Cinematography: Robert Kohner
- Music by: Dimitri Tiomkin
- Production company: Universal Pictures
- Distributed by: Universal Pictures
- Release date: March 6, 1931
- Running time: 85 minutes
- Country: United States
- Language: Spanish

Resurrection (Spanish: Resurrección) is a 1931 Spanish-language adaptation of Leo Tolstoy's 1899 novel Resurrection produced by Universal Studios, the same year they made the first English-language all-talking version of the film. The film was directed by Eduardo Arozamena and David Selman and starred Gilbert Roland and Lupe Vélez, who also starred in the English-language version.

== Plot ==
Simultaneously shot Spanish version of Tolstoy adaptation: After a woman he has formerly mistreated is sentenced for a crime a man who was part of her jury joins her on the trip to Siberia to expatiate his guilt.

== Cast ==
=== Spanish version ===
The cast list is as follows:

- Lupe Vélez - Katyusha Maslova
- Gilbert Roland - Prince Dmitir Nekhludov (*as Luis Alonso)
- Miguel Faust Rocha - Capitan Shenbok
- Soledad Jimenez - Maria
- Amelia Senisterra - Princess Sofia
- Eduardo Arozamena
- Blanca de Castejón
- Ramón Pereda - ?unknown
