= Una viuda difícil =

- Directed by: Fernando Ayala
- Written by: Conrado Nalé Roxlo
- Based on: The play Una viuda dificil by Conrado Nalé Roxlo
- Produced by: Fernando Ayala
- Starring: Alba Arnova; Alfredo Alcón; Ricardo Castro Ríos
- Cinematography: Francis Boeniger
- Edited by: Atilio Rinaldi; Ricardo Rodríguez Nistal; Ricardo Mistral
- Music by: Ástor Piazzolla
- Production company: Artistas Argentinos Asociados
- Distributed by: Artistas Argentinos Asociados
- Release date: 1957
- Running time: 100 minutes
- Country: Argentina
- Language: Spanish

Una viuda difícil (English: A Difficult Widow) is a 1957 Argentine comedy film directed by Fernando Ayala and written by Conrado Nalé Roxlo, based on his homonymous theatre play. It stars Alba Arnova, Alfredo Alcón and Ricardo Castro Ríos. Music was composed by Ástor Piazzolla and Vassili Lambrinos created the choreography for the black and white film.

== Synopsis ==
In the Colonial Buenos Aires a beautiful widow marries an outcast man just to spite someone else.

== Cast ==
- Alba Arnova
- Alfredo Alcón
- Ricardo Castro Ríos
- Joaquín Pibernat
- Francisco López Silva
- Mariela Reyes
- María Esther Podestá
- Manuel Alcón
- Lucía Barause
- Marcela Sola
- Carlos Barbetti
- Jorge Hilton
- Luis Orbegoso
- Luis de Lucía
- Francisco Audenino
- Rafael Diserio
- Adolfo Gallo
- Manuel Ochoa
- Sergio Villamil
- Mario Savino
- Alberto Quiles
- Irma Villamil
- Néstor Pérez Fernández
- Amalia Lozano
- Angélica Marina
- Julián Pérez Ávila
- Domingo Garibotto
