= Chiruca =

- Directed by: Benito Perojo
- Production company: Pampa Film
- Release date: 1946
- Running time: 85 minute
- Country: Argentina
- Language: Spanish

Chiruca is a 1946 film of the classical era of Argentine cinema based on the play of the same name by Adolfo Torrado.

== Cast ==
Benito Perojo (director)
Elisa Galvé
Catalina Bárcena
Ricardo Passano
Manuel Collado
Homero Cárpena
Carmen Lamas
Delfy de Ortega
Eduardo González
Paquita Mas
Vicente Ariño
Fernando Iglesias "Tacholas"
