= Florencio Parravicini =

Argentine actor

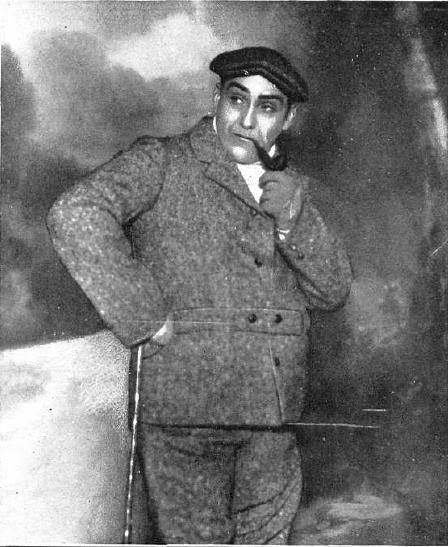
- Parravicini in 1913
- Born: Florencio Bartolomé Parravicini Romero Cazón; 24 August 1876; Buenos Aires, Argentina
- Died: 25 March 1941 (aged 64); Buenos Aires, Argentina
- Occupation: Actor
- Years active: 1906–1941

Florencio Parravicini (24 August 1876 – 25 March 1941) was an Argentine actor who primarily worked during the Golden Age of Argentine Cinema, performing on both stage and in films. From an aristocratic family, he was a relative of the artist Benjamín Solari Parravicini (1898-1974). He began his career singing música criolla, a Latino folk genre of music that exists in many countries throughout Latin America. He appeared in more than three hundred theatrical works and films, becoming one of the leading figures of Argentine entertainment. Facing cancer, Parravicini committed suicide in 1941.

== Biography ==
Florencio Bartolomé Parravicini Romero Cazón was born on 24 August 1876 in Buenos Aires, Argentina. His father, Col. Reinaldo Parravicini, was the director of the penitentiary and his grandfather had been an Italian marquis who owned a large landed estate. At fourteen, he was destined for the priesthood, but abandoned the vocation for a life that was branded eccentric, genius, mad, and "a most remarkable creation". For many it was difficult to tell where his acting diverged from his real life.

In his youth, he was said to have hunted wolves in Patagonia and was known for remarkable aim and skill with firearms. At the age of 20, he inherited a fortune from his parents and squandered it in Paris on parties and in casinos, He worked in various trades, including as a tour guide, as a comic in a coffee house and in venues singing música criolla. He returned to Argentina and for a while worked as a smuggler in Puerto Deseado, but made his way back to Buenos Aires. He was acting in low-class cafés and variety shows, when he was seen by Ulises Favaro, who introduced Parravicini to Pepe Podestá in 1906. Podestá was one of a team of brothers who performed and trained actors in theatrical comedy at the Teatro Apolo. By 1908, Parravicini had his own acting troupe and was performing throughout Argentina. He was most known for his improvisation, dropping words that were not in the script in suggestive manners to elicit laughter which the audiences loved. He helped many actresses get their start in the business including Amelia Bence, Olinda Bozán, Mecha Ortiz, Paulina Singerman and others.

In 1910, he took up flying, earned his pilot's licence and the designation civil brevet No. 2 of Argentina. Parravicini next ventured into silent films as writer and director, working in collaboration with Enrique Ernesto Gunche and Eduardo Martínez de la Pera on the film Hasta después de muerta, which he wrote and acted in. The project made him realize there was no money in silent films and he did not make another film until talkies were introduced. He opted to try his hand at politics and ran in the 1926 municipal elections on the ticket of the "Partido Gente de Teatro" (Party of Theater People) and actually won a seat. His performance, other than a tribute for the Prince of Wales when he visited Argentina, was negligible.

When Parravicini next appeared in film, the picture, Los muchachos de antes no usaban gomina directed by Manuel Romero co-starring with Santiago Arrieta, Irma Córdoba and Mecha, became a classic of Argentine film. His move into movies came about largely because he was tired of being typecast as a comic. In 1931, when he tried to perform a serious role at the Broadway Theater, the minute he appeared on stage, the audience began laughing in anticipation of his double entendres. In addition to making films, he began traveling to perform throughout Latin America, where he was unknown. In his 35 years of theater performances, Parravicini had over 300 performances, had had numerous artists write plays specifically for him and had become a fixture of Argentine theater.

After having been diagnosed with cancer, Parravicini committed suicide on 15 March 1941.

== Filmography ==
=== As a writer ===
- Hasta después de muerta (1916)
- Melgarejo (1937)
- Luisito (1943)

=== As an actor ===
- Hasta después de muerta (1916)
- Gervasio Ponce, el Mocho
- Los muchachos de antes no usaban gomina (1936)
- Melgarejo (1937)
- Three Argentines in Paris (1938)
- Noches de Carnaval (1938)
- El diablo con faldas (1938)
- La vida es un tango (1939)
- Margarita, Armando y su padre (1939)
- Carnaval de antaño (1940)
