= The Falcon's Brother =

1942 film by Stanley Logan

- Original theatrical poster
- Directed by: Stanley Logan
- Screenplay by: Stuart Palmer; Craig Rice
- Based on: Characters created by Michael Arlen
- Produced by: Maurice Geraghty
- Starring: George Sanders; Tom Conway; Jane Randolph
- Cinematography: Russell Metty
- Edited by: Mark Robson
- Music by: Roy Webb
- Production company: RKO Radio Pictures Inc.
- Distributed by: RKO Radio Pictures
- Release date: November 6, 1942 (United States)
- Running time: 63 mins.
- Country: United States
- Language: English
- Budget: $134,361

The Falcon's Brother is a 1942 American crime drama film in which George Sanders, who had been portraying The Falcon in a series of films, appears with his real-life brother Tom Conway; with Sanders handing off the series to Conway, who would play the new Falcon in nine subsequent films. (Note: Born Thomas Charles Sanders, Tom Conway was also a lookalike for his younger brother, George Sanders.) Jane Randolph was featured in a supporting role. The Falcon's Brother, the only film in the series to feature two Falcons, was directed by Stanley Logan.

== Plot ==
Sleuth Gay Lawrence, known as The Falcon, and assistant Lefty arrive at dockside to meet a Latin American cruise ship. On board is Lawrence's brother, Tom, who is pronounced dead, a victim of suicide, by homicide inspector Timothy Donovan. Diane Medford, Tom's shipboard companion offers sympathy but Lawrence has Lefty tail her, as he already knew that the body in the cabin was not his brother.

Tracking Diane to a fashion show at the salon of her employer Madame Arlette, Diane is greeted by her fiancé, fashion editor Paul Harrington. Two other ship passengers, Latin American dancers Carmela and Valdez are there. Reporter Marcia Brooks recognizes the Falcon, who follows Diane into her office. A shot rings out and Diane falls dead. The Falcon runs into the alley behind the salon and encounters Tom.

Donovan arrives at the scene and arrests Lefty while the Falcon is run down by a speeding car. Tom takes the unconscious Falcon to his apartment, where Marcia seeks information about the murder. Lefty is released with a suspended sentence and learns the Falcon will soon recover. Marcia informs Tom that the murder weapon is missing, prompting Tom to return to Arlette's salon to investigate.

Seeing Arlette at a nightclub, Tom informs her that the police have the gun from the murder scene and are tracing its serial number. Arlette phones the Donovan and gives them Tom's whereabouts. Tom and Lefty search Arlette's, where they find the missing gun hidden in a mannequin. Donovan tracks them down at the salon and when Tom introduces himself, Donovan arrests him for false impersonation, believing Tom is dead.

After proving his identity, Tom is freed and directs Marcia to investigate Harrington's photographer Savitski. Tom confronts Arlette with the gun, forcing her to admit that she hid the weapon to protect her love, Harrington who denies murdering Diane and is exonerated by a ballistics expert. Marcia discovers that Savitski is an illegal alien. After smoking a cigar, and about to reveal a clue about mass murders to Tom and Lefty, Savitski falls dead, dropping a pile of magazines.

Deducing that Savitski was killed by a poisoned cigar, the same way the suicide victim on the ship was killed, Tom instructs Lefty to pose as the photographer when Valdez and Carmela enter his office with guns drawn. When Tom steps out of the shadows, the pair identify themselves as Mexican counter-espionage agents and explain that Diane was killed because she knew too much. After Tom notifies Donovan of Savitski's murder, he brings back the photographer's magazines. Certain that Harrington is involved in the murders, Tom and Lefty realize a magazine cover dated December 7, prophesying the Pearl Harbor attack and another magazine cover indicates an incident will take place that day at a Long Island inn.

Tom and Marcia speed off to stop the sabotage, while the Falcon regains consciousness and joins Lefty on a trip to Long Island where German agents have been preparing for an attack and Harrington is one of them. After capturing Tom and Marcia and locking them in a bell tower, the agents go ahead with their plan to assassinate a Latin American envoy as his aircraft lands. Tom manages to ring the bell, just as the Falcon steps in front of the diplomat, sacrificing his own life for that of an ally. With the spy ring smashed, Tom takes up where his brother left off, becoming the new Falcon.

== Cast ==
- George Sanders as Gay Lawrence/The Falcon
- Tom Conway as Tom Lawrence/The Falcon
- Jane Randolph as Marcia Brooks
- Don Barclay as Lefty
- Cliff Clark as Inspector Timothy Donovan
- Edward Gargan as Detective Bates
- Eddie Dunn as Detective Grimes
- Charlotte Wynters as Arlette
- James Newill as Paul Harrington
- Keye Luke as Jerry
- Amanda Varela as Carmela
- George J. Lewis as Valdez
- Gwili Andre as Diane Medford
- André Charlot as Savitski
- Mary Halsey as Miss Ross
- Charles Arnt as Pat Moffett
- Richard Martin as Steamship Official
- Julie Warren as Flashy girl
- Ken Harlan as Torrence
- Andre Marsaudon as Dr. De Sola
- John Dilson as Ship's Doctor
- Eddy Chandler as First Mate
- Jack Gargan as Steward
- Tommy Tucker as Boy
- Kay Aldridge as Spanish Model
- Georgia Carroll as Cover Girl
- Bonnie Kildare as Miss Honolulu
- Max Waizman as Devlin
- Percy Launders as Doorman
- Ralph Brooks as Attendant

== Production ==
In January 1942, George Sanders reported he no longer wished to make films in The Falcon series. Although he was being replaced by his elder brother Tom Conway, Sanders wanted out of the series and insisted that his character Gay Lawrence be killed off in The Falcon's Brother. RKO had wanted to have Sanders star in one more Falcon film with the enticement that having his brother take over the lead role would further his career. In the end, the Conway-starred films had more financial success than those that featured Sanders.

== Reception ==
=== Critical ===
In his review of The Falcon's Brother, Bosley Crowther wrote, in The New York Times, "... in this final encounter of the gay detective with the criminally inclined, Mr. Sanders only opens the snooping and then is conveniently retired while his true (as well as fictional) brother, Tom Conway, takes over the pursuit. And then, in the end, Mr. Sanders is unconditionally killed—killed in heroic line of duty—while Mr. Conway is left to carry on. Thus one Falcon passes, but another is providentially fledged. It is too bad that as much ingenuity as was used to effect this interfraternal switch was not put into the further contrivance of a plot. As it is, The Falcon's Brother is just a moderately confusing mystery tale, boasting but three casual murders and the final disposition of Mr. S. Nazi spies, it turns out, are the villains, and that's pretty routine these days. And, ungraciously perhaps, it must be stated that Mr. Conway is only fair as a hero. His voice is like Mr. Sanders's, but his manners are not quite so suave."

=== Box Office ===
The Falcon's Brother earned a profit of $128,000.
