= Pepita Jiménez (1946 film) =

1946 film

- Directed by: Emilio Fernández
- Written by: Emilio Fernández; Mauricio Magdaleno
- Based on: Pepita Jiménez by Juan Valera
- Produced by: Óscar Dancigers
- Starring: Rosita Díaz Gimeno; Ricardo Montalban; Fortunio Bonanova
- Cinematography: Alex Phillips
- Edited by: Gloria Schoemann
- Music by: Antonio Díaz Conde
- Production companies: Águila Films; Producciones Cafisa
- Distributed by: Películas Nacionales
- Release date: 22 February 1946
- Running time: 84 minutes
- Country: Mexico
- Language: Spanish

Pepita Jiménez is a 1946 Mexican historical romantic drama film directed by Emilio Fernández and starring Rosita Díaz Gimeno, Ricardo Montalban and Fortunio Bonanova. It was shot at the Clasa Studios in Mexico City. The film's sets were designed by the art directors Manuel Fontanals and Javier Torres Torija. It is based on the 1874 novel of the same time by Juan Valera, which had previously been adapted into a 1925 Spanish silent film.

== Cast ==
- Rosita Díaz Gimeno as Pepita Jiménez
- Ricardo Montalban as Luis Vargas
- Fortunio Bonanova as Don Pedro Vargas
- Consuelo Guerrero de Luna as Antonieta
- Carlos Orellana as Padre Belisario
- Rafael Alcayde as Conde
- José Morcillo as Don Gumersindo
- Antonio Bravo as Poeta
- Manuel Noriega as Ceferino, criado
- Conchita Sáenz as Tía Casilda
- Manuel Pozos as Don Hermogenes, boticario
- Luis Mussot as Don Onofre, médico
- Rafael Acevedo as Primo Curro
- Niño de Caravaca as Cantante
- Julio Villarreal as Tío cura

== Bibliography ==
- Berg, Charles Ramírez. The Classical Mexican Cinema: The Poetics of the Exceptional Golden Age Films. University of Texas Press, 2015.
- Gilabert, Rosa Peralt. Manuel Fontanals, escenógrafo: teatro, cine y exilio. Editorial Fundamentos, 2007.
- Irwin, Robert & Ricalde, Maricruz. Global Mexican Cinema: Its Golden Age. British Film Institute, 2013.
