= El Hombre Señalado =

El hombre señalado
- Directed by: Francis Lauric
- Written by: Alberto Peyrou; Diego Santillán
- Produced by: Emilio Spitz
- Starring: Antonia Herrero
- Cinematography: Enrique Ritter
- Edited by: Nicolás Proserpio
- Release date: 8 August 1957
- Running time: 78 minutes
- Country: Argentina
- Language: Spanish

El hombre señalado is a 1957 Argentine drama film directed by Francis Lauric. It was entered into the 7th Berlin International Film Festival.

== Plot ==
A man tries to track down a winning lottery ticket that is rapidly changing owners inside an old straw hat his wife sold.

== Cast ==
- Cristina Berys
- Homero Cárpena
- Enrique Chaico
- Raúl del Valle
- Mario Fortuna
- José María Gutiérrez
- Antonia Herrero
- Francisco López Silva
- Luis Otero
- Pedro Quartucci
- Miriam Sucre
