= Our Lady of Sorrows (film) =

- Film poster
- Spanish: La Dolorosa
- Directed by: Jean Grémillon
- Written by: Juan José Lorente; Jean Grémillon
- Starring: Rosita Díaz Gimeno; Agustín Godoy; Mary Amparo Bosch; Pilar Garcia
- Cinematography: José María Beltrán; Jacques Montheraud
- Music by: Daniel Montorio; José Serrano
- Production company: Falcó Films
- Distributed by: Cifesa
- Release date: 1934
- Running time: 85 minutes
- Country: Spain
- Language: Spanish

Our Lady of Sorrows (Spanish: La Dolorosa) is a 1934 Spanish musical drama film directed by Jean Grémillon and starring Rosita Díaz Gimeno, Agustín Godoy and Mary Amparo Bosch. It is an adaptation of the 1930 zarzuela La dolorosa. The film was made at the leading Spanish CEA Studios and shot on location in Aragon with 1500 extras. It was a box office hit on its release. The film was part of a popular European trend of operetta films during the 1930s.

== Plot ==
When Dolores abandons Rafael for a cadet, a sensitive young painter becomes a monk. But when Dolores realizes what she have done, she abandons her child whom she had with another man. Will Rafael be able to help a woman who made a foolish choice?

== Cast ==
- Rosita Díaz Gimeno as Dolores
- Agustín Godoy as Rafael
- Mary Amparo Bosch as Nicasia
- Pilar Garcia as Dolores's mother
- Eva López as Juanica
- María De Araya as Sirvienta
- Maruja Berges as Inés
- Ramón Cebrián as Perico
- José María Linares-Rivas as Natalio
- Anselmo Fernandez as Uncle José
- Alberto López as Uncle Bienvenido
- Luis Llaneza as Don Serafín
- Luis Moreno as prior
