= Lost Kisses (1945 film) =

- Directed by: Mario Soffici
- Written by: Ramón Gómez Macía
- Based on: Baisers perdus (play) by André Birabeau
- Starring: María Duval
- Cinematography: Francis Boeniger
- Edited by: Emilio Murúa, Carlos Rinaldi
- Music by: Isidro B. Maiztegui
- Release date: 30 August 1945
- Running time: 67 minutes
- Country: Argentina
- Language: Spanish

Lost Kisses (Spanish: Besos perdidos) is a 1945 Argentine film of the classical era of Argentine cinema, directed by Mario Soffici and starring María Duval and Miguel Faust Rocha.

== Cast ==
- María Duval
- Miguel Faust Rocha
- Alberto Bello
- Alita Román
- Héctor Coire
- Elina Colomer
- Homero Cárpena
- Juana Sujo
- Ángel Walk
- Luis Otero

== Reception ==
Manrupe and Portela wrote: "Poorly filmed, it is one of those missteps by Mario Soffici"; "but, nevertheless, it shows a glimpse of rebellion towards the elders and an unconventional ending for the time". The film was also described as the first that is alien to the director's cinematic conceptions.

The film received positive reviews in El Orden and Critica.
