= Margarita, Armando y su padre =

- Screenshot
- Directed by: Francisco Múgica
- Written by: Enrique Jardiel Poncela
- Produced by: Francisco Múgica
- Starring: Mecha Ortiz; Pedro Quartucci
- Cinematography: José María Beltrán; Pablo Tabernero
- Edited by: Juan Soffici
- Music by: Enrique Delfino
- Distributed by: Lumiton
- Release date: 1939
- Running time: 90 minutes
- Country: Argentina
- Language: Spanish

Margarita, Armando y su padre is a 1939 Argentine romantic comedy film directed by Francisco Múgica during the Golden Age of Argentine cinema. The film is based a play by Enrique Jardiel Poncela who himself adapted the film for the silver screen. The film premiered in Buenos Aires and starred Mecha Ortiz and Pedro Quartucci. Production design of the film was performed by Ricardo J. Conord.

== Overview ==
The film produces a revival of the famous play, treating its characters in an ironical way.

=== Cast ===
- Florencio Parravicini ... Spaghetti - Armando's father
- Mecha Ortiz ... Margarita
- Ernesto Raquén ... Armando
- María Santos ... Julia
- Pedro Quartucci ... Antonito
- Carmen Lamas ... Flora
- Alita Román ... Cristina
- Enrique Roldán ... Ernesto Landaluce
- Héctor Quintanilla ... Caballo de Atila
- Alfredo Jordan ... Manolo
- Alfonso Pisano ... Ceferino
- Susy Derqui ... Luz de Bengala
- Hilda Sour ... Cameo
- Olga Mon ... Rosita
- Liana Moabro... Maruja
- José Alfayate ... Román
- Berta Aliana ... Mucama
- Lalo Bouhier ... Vendedor
- Cayetano Biondo ... Mozo
- J. Armando Chamot ... Maitre
- Cirilo Etulain
