= Mecha Ortiz =

Argentine actress (1900–1987)

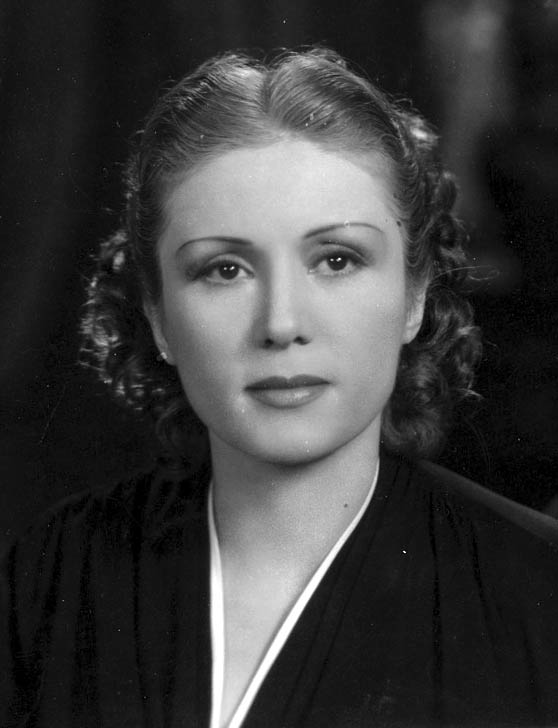
- Mecha Ortiz in Mujeres que trabajan (1938).
- Born: María Mercedes Varela Nimo Domínguez Castro; 24 September 1900; Buenos Aires, Argentina
- Died: 20 October 1987 (aged 87); Buenos Aires, Argentina
- Occupation: actress
- Years active: 1936–1976

Mecha Ortiz (née María Mercedes Varela Nimo Domínguez Castro; 1900–1987) was an Argentine actress who appeared in films between 1937 and 1981, during the Golden Age of Argentine cinema. At the 1944 Argentine Film Critics Association Awards, Ortiz won the Silver Condor Award for Best Actress for her performance in Safo, historia de una pasión (1943), and won it again in 1946 for her performance in El canto del cisne (1945). She was known as the Argentine Greta Garbo and for playing mysterious characters, who suffered by past misfortunes in love, mental disorders, or forbidden love. Safo, historia de una pasión was the first erotic Argentine film, though there was no nudity. She also played in the first film in which a woman struck a man and the first film with a lesbian romance. In 1981, she was awarded the Grand Prize for actresses from the National Endowment for the Arts.

== Early life and background ==
María Mercedes Varela Nimo Domínguez Castro, known as Mecha was born 24 September 1900. Until she was 29, Mecha, was married to a farmer and was busy being a wife and mother. She had enrolled for acting classes in the Conservatorio Nacional de Música y Declamación (National Conservatory of Music and Speech) in the inaugural class under the direction of Carlos López Buchardo and Enrique García Velloso. This first class of 1926, which included Ortiz, Miguel Mileo and Paulina Singerman, among others, sought to teach acting using a standardized manual. When her husband was thrown from a horse and had a serious back injury, she took a job in the prosecutor's office, refusing help from her well-to-do family. Her sister, Amanda Varela, was an established actress and got her a screen test with Paramount Studios of France. She was selected but no films were made, so her sister introduced her to a friend, influential film critic Chas de Cruz, who helped her find work.

== Career ==
She began her entertainment career as a supporting actress in the Rivera-De Rosas Theatre Company of Enrique de Rosas. She debuted on stage with El Proceso de Mary Duggan, by Bayard Veiller on 20 June 1929, at the Ateneo Theater. In 1933, she was in the production of Mirandolina by Carlo Goldoni which was put on by the Theater Company of Antonio Cunill Cabanellas. Also in 1933, she appeared in Corine with Guillermo Battaglia, Nedda Francy, Miguel Faust Rocha and Iris Marga at the Odeón Theater. She had a theatrical season on the Smart Theater, in 1938 with "Mujeres", written by US actress and writer Clare Boothe Luce, and co-starring Amelia Bence.

In 1936 she had her first film role as "Rubia Mireya", with Florencio Parravicini, Irma Córdoba and Santiago Arrieta, in the classic Los muchachos de antes no usaban gomina directed by Manuel Romero. The role was the first of many wherein she played a character who could not be with the man she loved, but made personal sacrifices to be honorable. Mecha was often cast as mysterious characters, plagued by past misfortunes in love, mental disorders, or forbidden love and was frequently compared with Greta Garbo. She was also seen as a symbol of sophistication and was referred to in other works to denote the line between what was chic or provincial. Years later the character was brought back for Ortiz in the film La Rubia Mireya (1948) with Fernando Lamas also directed by Manuel Romero. In this version, a woman who had reluctantly married, divorced and is rejected by her daughter.

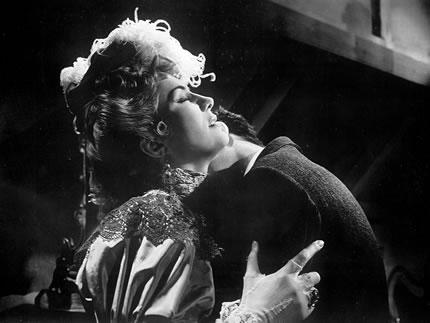
Ortiz in Safo, historia de una pasión

In 1938 she starred with Niní Marshall in Mujeres que trabajan, which was directed by Manuel Romero, Con las alas rotas directed by Orestes Caviglia and Maestro Levita with Pepe Arias. In 1943 Lumiton produced, Safo, historia de una pasión, adapted from Alphonse Daudet, directed by Carlos Hugo Christensen with Roberto Escalada. Safo was Argentina's first erotic film and was forbidden to minors. There was no nudity in the film, but the innuendo of a sexual encounter between the characters played by Ortiz and Escalada arose from their smoking a cigarette together. She won her first Silver Condor Award for Best Actress for Safo at the 1944 ceremony. The "forbidden" romance of an older woman and a younger man, was repeated in the 1945 sequel El canto del cisne (Swan Song) for which Ortiz won acting awards in Cuba and Brazil, as well as the Argentine Silver Condor Award for Best Actress.

Stability and permanence was rarely found in Argentine theatre companies. One of the exceptions was La Compañía Argentina de Comedias Mecha Ortiz (the Argentine Comedy Company of Mecha Ortiz) which included a cast of Ortiz, Lola Membrives, Rosa Rosen and Narciso Ibáñez Menta. In early 1949, she and the director Luis Mottura, led and managed their own cast, which stayed together for almost a decade, disbanding in 1958. They produced over 15 productions—the best being "Iremos a Valparaíso " by Marcel Achard at the Odeón Theater on 13 May 1949; " “Un tranvía llamado deseo” (A Streetcar Named Desire) by Tennessee Williams at the Casino Theater on 7 July 1952; "Rueda de amantes" by Regás Luz Maria and Juan Albornoz at the Casino Theater on 27 July 1953; "Anna Karenina" by Raymond Rouleau, based on Leo Tolstoy's novel at the Casino Theater on 11 June 1953; " Tú el ángel y yo el demonio " by Maria Luz Regás and Juan Albornoz at the Versailles Theater on 6 April 1954; "Sandra" by Sixto Pondal Ríos and Carlos Olivari at the Versailles Theater on 6 April 1955; and "Ardelé (la margarita del amor) " by Jean Anouilh and translated by Maria Luz Regás at the Athenaeum Theatre on 23 May 1957.

She starred in films such as Una mujer sin importancia (1945) with Santiago Gómez Cou, which was the first film in which a woman slapped a man; Camino del infierno by Luis Saslavsky with Pedro López Lagar, Amelia Bence and Elsa O'Connor; Las tres ratas (1946) by Carlos Schlieper with María Duval; Madame Bovary (1947), Cartas de amor (1951), and Mi vida por la tuya (1951) with Emma Gramatica, in which Ortiz's singing voice was dubbed by Nelly Omar; She played a prison guard in the 1952 film Deshonra by Daniel Tinayre with Fanny Navarro, which featured the first lesbian love affair on Argentine film. La sombra de Safo (1957) under the direction of Julio Porter, reunited Ortiz and Robert Escalada and she made Las Furias (1960) with Elsa Daniel, Aida Luz, Alba Mujica, and Olga Zubarry.

Between 1940 and 1950 she broadcast on the radio on the Teatro del Aire Palmolive with Orestes Caviglia, Pedro López Lagar, and Francisco Petrone. Then beginning in the late 1950s, she appeared in television series, including El mar profundo y azul (1956), Estrellita, esa pobre campesina (1968-1969), Rolando Rivas, taxista (1972-1973), Invitación a Jamaica (1977) and Aventura '77 (1977). Her last appearance on TV was in 1981 for the ATC Special Christmas 2000 with Rosa Rosen, Duilio Marzio, Luisa Vehil and Iris Marga.

In the 1960s, her career began to decline and she made a suicide attempt, which was stopped by her son. She returned to the theatre and did a revival of El proceso de Mary Duggan (1965-1966), Así es la vida (1967), Canción para un crepúsculo (1968) and several television roles.

Her return to the screen came a decade later in 1974 with Boquitas pintadas, based on a novel by Manuel Puig, directed by Leopoldo Torre Nilsson, with Alfredo Alcon and Marta González. In 1976 along with other stars, like Arturo García Buhr, Mario Soffici, Bárbara Mujica and Narciso Ibáñez Menta, Ortiz plays in Los muchachos de antes no usaban arsénico. The plot is a black comedy about aging, friendships, madness and greed. Piedra libre (1976) was her last film also directed by Leopoldo Torre Nilsson with Marilina Ross and Juan José Camero.

In 1981, she was awarded the Grand Prize for actresses from the National Endowment for the Arts. She wrote her memoirs under the title Mecha Ortiz by Mecha Ortiz. They were published in 1982.

== Family ==
Her husband, Julián Ortiz, was a farmer in Argentina. When she was 29, her husband was injured in a fall from a horse. Some articles have said he became a paraplegic, and others that he spent nearly 3 decades in a coma after the accident. Ortiz was dedicated to him and their privacy, which in many instances escalated the mystery and speculation about her. Their son, Julián, became a translator and playwright. Her brother, José, was a theatre director, and a sister, Amanda Varela, was also an actress.

== Death ==
She died on 20 October 1987 in Buenos Aires, Argentina.

== Filmography ==
=== Movies ===
- Los muchachos de antes no usaban gomina (La Rubia Mireya) (1937)
- Melgarejo (Clotilde Contreras) (1937)
- Maestro Levita (Elena Acevedo de Lerena) (1938)
- Con las alas rotas (Nelly Rover) (1938)
- Mujeres que trabajan (Ana María del Solar) (1938)
- Margarita, Armando y su padre (Margarita) (1939)
- Último refugio (Albareda) (1941)
- Joven, viuda y estanciera (Elena Ocampo) (1941)
- Vidas marcadas (Malena) (1942)
- El gran secreto (Alicia) (1942)
- Safo, historia de una pasión (Selva Moreno – Safo) (1943)
- Mi novia es un fantasma (1944)
- Una mujer sin importancia (Raquel Miramar) (1945)
- El canto del cisne (Flora Jordán) (1945)
- Road of Hell (Laura Simrok) (1945)
- The Three Rats (Mercedes de la Fuente) (1946)
- Madame Bovary (Emma Bovary) (1947)
- Vacaciones (Estela Arenal) (1947)
- El precio de una vida (Princesa Fedora Romanov) (1947)
- María de los Ángeles (Maria de los Angeles Ermosilla y Albarracín) (1948)
- La Rubia Mireya (Ana María Peña de Robles – La Rubia Mireya) (1948)
- Sangre en Castilla (Alcaldesa Teresa Marquesa de Pinorrey) (1950)
- Cartas de amor (Antonieta Lear) (1951)
- Mi vida por la tuya (Gloria Rivas) (1951)
- Deshonra (Directora Interventora) (1952)
- El Abuelo (Lucrecia Vélez) (1954)
- El mal amor (Marcela) (1955)
- Pájaros de cristal (Irina Galowa) (1955)
- Bendita seas (María) (1956)
- La sombra de Safo (Selva Moreno – Safo) (1957)
- Las furias (Madre) (1960)
- Bajo un mismo rostro (Madre Superiora) (1962)
- Las locas del conventillo (María y la otra) (Remedios) (1966)
- La señora Ana luce sus medallas (Ann Dewey) (1967)
- Boquitas pintadas (Gitana) (1974)
- La casa de las sombras (Mrs. Randall) (1976)
- Los muchachos de antes no usaban arsénico (Mara Ordáz) (1976)
- Piedra libre (Amalia Pradere/Amalia Grande) (1976)

=== Television ===
- Los especiales de ATC -Ep: "Navidad en el año 2000" (Mercedes)- *ATC* (1981)
- Aventura '77 *Channel 9* (1977)
- Invitación a Jamaica (Victoria) *Channel 13* (1977)
- Dulce Anastasia (Gran Duquesa rusa) *Channel 13* (1977)
- Alta Comedia -Ep:"Mesas separadas (Sra Meacham)"- *Channel 9* (1974)
- Rolando Rivas, taxista (Malú) *Channel 13* (1972-1973)
- Ciclo de teatro argentino -Ep: "El organito" (Angiulina)- *Channel 7* (1970)
- La botica del ángel -Seg: "Setenta pecados siete"- *Channel 11* (1970)
- Estrellita, esa pobre campesina (Mercedes de Castro) *Channel 13* (1968-1969)
- Standard Electric Show *Channel 11* (1965)
- Anna Christie (Marty) (1965)
- La hora Fate -Ep: "Los acosados" *Channel 9* (1960)
- Elizabeth está muerta (Elizabeth I) *Channel 9* (1960)
- Los cuatro posters (Ana) *Channel 7* (1959)
- La esposa constante (Costanza) *Channel 7* (1959)
- Un tranvía llamado Deseo (Blanche Dubois) *Channel 7* (1956)
- El mar profundo y azul (Esther Collins) *Channel 7* (1956)

== Theater ==
- Los cien rejóvenes años (1973)
- Canción para un crepúsculo (1968)
- Así es la vida (1967)
- El proceso de Mary Duggan (1965-1966)
- Culpables (1963)
- Amantes en verano (1962)
- Lecho nupcial (1961)
- La esposa constante (1961)
- Jano (1961)
- Delito en la isla de las cabras (1961)
- Castillo en Suecia (1961)
- La visita de la anciana dama (1961)
- La esposa constante (1958) *Actor and director
- Frenesí (1956 )
- Un tranvía llamado Deseo (Blanche Dubois) (1956)
- El mar hondo y azul (1955)
- Sandra (1955)
- Iremos a Valparaíso (1955)
- También las mujeres han perdido la guerra (1955)
- Tú, el ángel y el demonio (1954)
- La cama (1954)
- Anna Karenina (1953)
- Rueda de amantes (1953)
- La hechicera del Corinto (1953)
- Un tranvía llamado Deseo (Blanche Dubois) (1952)
- El mal amor (1951)
- El mago escondido (1949)
- La esposa constante (1949)
- Iremos a Valparaíso (1949)
- La señora Ana luce sus medallas (1945)
- Mujeres (1938 )
- Corine (1933)
- Mirandolina (1933)
- El proceso de Mary Duggan (1929)

== Autobiography ==
- Mecha Ortiz por Mecha Ortiz Moreno: Buenos Aires (1982) (In Spanish)
