= Hasta después de muerta =

1916 film directed by Florencio Parravicini

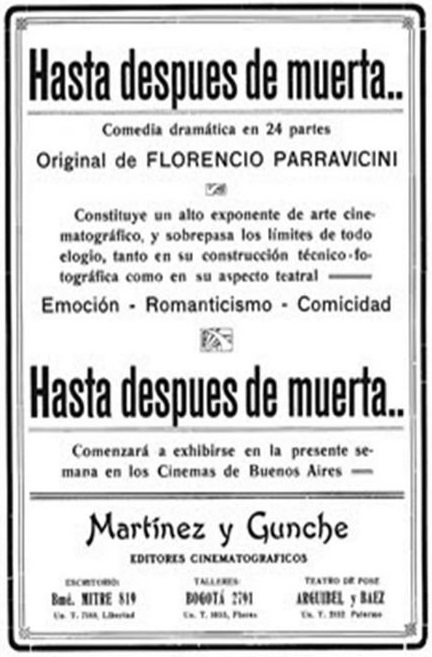
- Original film poster
- Directed by: Enrique Ernesto Gunche; Eduardo Martínez de la Pera; Florencio Parravicini
- Screenplay by: Florencio Parravicini
- Starring: Argentino Gómez; María Fernanda Ladrón de Guevara; Florencio Parravicini; Pedro Quartucci; Orfilia Rico
- Cinematography: Eduardo Martínez de la Pera; Enrique Ernesto Gunche
- Production company: Martínez y Gunche
- Release date: 1916
- Running time: 80 min.
- Language: Spanish

Hasta después de muerta ('Til After Her Death) is a 1916 Argentine silent film, shot in black and white. It was directed by Ernesto Gunche and Eduardo Martínez de la Pera and written by Florencio Parravicini. The film was released in 1916 and it had Florencio Parravicini, Pedro Quartucci, Orfilia Rico and Enrique Serrano as the main characters. The story is told through flashbacks, which was unusual for the era.

== Cast ==
- Florencio Parravicini
- Orfilia Rico
- Silvia Parodi
- María Fernanda Ladrón de Guevara
- Mariano Galé
- Argentino Gómez
- Enrique Serrano
- Alímedes Nelson
- Pedro Quartucci

== Plot ==
Beginning at the grave of a young woman, the film is a long flashback that tells the story of that young woman with a couple of medical students in a comical way at times and dramatic in others. Transcript of the multiple personality of Florencio Parravicini, scriptwriter and leading actor. It was a bourgeois and citizen theme, with touches of comedy alternating the melodramatic context.
