= A Gentleman in Tails =

1931 film

- Directed by: Roger Capellani; Carlos San Martín
- Written by: Honorio Maura; John McDermott; Yves Mirande (play); André Picard (play); Saint-Granier
- Starring: Roberto Rey; Gloria Guzmán; Rosita Díaz Gimeno
- Cinematography: Theodore J. Pahle
- Music by: Paul Barnaby; Charles Borel-Clerc
- Production company: Paramount Pictures
- Distributed by: Paramount Pictures
- Release date: October 3, 1931
- Country: United States
- Language: Spanish

A Gentleman in Tails (Spanish:Un caballero de frac) is a 1931 American comedy film directed by Roger Capellani and Carlos San Martín and starring Roberto Rey, Gloria Guzmán and Rosita Díaz Gimeno. It is the Spanish-language version of the 1927 film Evening Clothes. It was made by Paramount Pictures at the Joinville Studios in Paris. A French-language version The Man in Evening Clothes was also released the same year.

== Cast ==
- Roberto Rey as André de Dussange
- Gloria Guzmán as Totoche
- Rosita Díaz Gimeno as Susana de Dussange
- Gabriel Algara as Pierre D'Allouville
- Luis Llaneza as Buffetaut
- Antonio Martínez as Soyer
- Marita Ángeles as Baby
- José Medina as Louis
- Manuel Kuindós as Guildé
- Antoñita Colomé as Ninette
- Antonio Monjardin as Firmin
- Carlos Martínez Baena as Maître
- Pedro Elviro

== Bibliography ==
- Eva Woods Peiró. White Gypsies: Race and Stardom in Spanish Musical Films. U of Minnesota Press, 2012.
