= Melgarejo =

- Directed by: Luis Moglia Barth
- Written by: Luis Moglia Barth; Florencio Parravicini
- Produced by: Angel Mentasti
- Starring: Santiago Gómez Cou; Mecha Ortiz; Orestes Caviglia
- Cinematography: Alberto Etchebehere
- Edited by: Carlos Rinaldi
- Music by: Francisco Lomuto; José Vázquez Vigo
- Distributed by: Argentina Sono Film
- Release date: 1937
- Running time: 85 minute
- Country: Argentina
- Language: Spanish

Melgarejo is a 1937 Argentine film directed and written by Luis Moglia Barth during the Golden Age of Argentine cinema. The film premiered in the US on September 19, 1937 and starred Santiago Gómez Cou and Mecha Ortiz. Editing to the film was performed by Carlos Rinaldi.

== Cast ==
- Florencio Parravicini as Cándido Melgarejo
- Mecha Ortiz as Clotilde Contreras
- Santiago Gómez Cou as Ricardo
- Orestes Caviglia as Carlos Bertolini
- Blanca del Prado as Julia Bertolini
- Ernesto Raquén as Juancito
- Rufino Córdoba as Clodomiro Barragán
- Margarita Padín as Cholita
- Ilde Pirovano as María Malatesta
- Blanca Vidal as Remigia Contreras
- Adelaida Soler as Martina
- José Ruzo as Capataz
- Dorita Ferreyro as Invitada 1 (as Dora Ferreiro)
- Tilda Thamar as Invitada 2
- Malisa Zini as Invitada 3
- Herminia Velich as Invitada 4
- Delia Garcés as Invitada 5
- Manuel Alcón as Liborio
- Amanda Varela as Invitada 6
- Juan Vítola
- Emilio Velich
