= Mary Parets =

Argentine actress

Mary Parets was an Argentine actress. In 1943 she starred in Benito Perojo's Stella. Other notable films include The Boys Didn't Wear Hair Gel Before (1937), Ambición (1939) and Los pagares de Mendieta (1939).

== Selected filmography ==
- The Boys Didn't Wear Hair Gel Before (1937)
