= Pedro Mata y Domínguez =

Spanish novelist, playwright, and poet

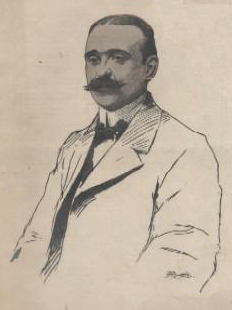
- Born: January 17, 1875; Madrid, Spain
- Died: December 27, 1946 (aged 71); Madrid, Spanish State
- Occupations: Writer, journalist, poet, novelist, playwright
- Writing career
- Period: 1901–1945

Pedro Mata Domínguez (Madrid, 17 January 1875 – Madrid, 27 December 1946) was a Spanish novelist, playwright and poet. He was the grandson of Pedro Mata Fontanet.

His first novel Ganarás el pan… received the prize of La Ilustración Española (1902), while his most popular novel was Corazones sin rumbo (1916), a work awarded the palm of the Círculo de Bellas Artes.

== Works ==
=== Novels ===
==== Independent novels ====
- Ganarás el pan… (1901)
- Ni amor ni arte (1907)
- Cuesta abajo (1908)
- La celada de Alonso Quijano (1909)
- En la boca del lobo (1910)
- El misterio de los ojos claros (1912)
- La catorce (1913)
- Los cigarrillos del Duque (1913)
- Corazones sin rumbo (1916)
- La paz del hogar (1916)
- El crimen de la calle de Ponzano (1917)
- La excesiva bondad (1917)
- Un grito en la noche (1918)
- Muñecos (1920)
- Irresponsables (1921)
- El hombre de la rosa blanca (1922)
- Teatro trágico (1922)
- Una aventura demasiado fácil (1923)
- El hombre que se reía del amor (1924)
- La reconquista (1929)
- El pájaro en la jaula (1930)
- Sinvergüenzas (1932)
- Las personas decentes (1935)
- Celosas (1945)

=== Novels in the series Más allá del amor ===
1. Más allá del amor y de la vida (1926)
2. Más allá del amor y de la muerte (1927)

=== Plays ===
- La Goya (1910)
- Uno menos (1912)
- El nublado (1932)

=== Poetry ===
- Para ella y para ellas: versos de amor (1918)
