= La Calle del pecado =

- Release date: 1954
- Running time: 107 minute
- Country: Argentina
- Language: Spanish

La Calle del pecado is a 1954 film of the classical era of Argentine cinema.

== Cast and Crew ==
- Director: Ernesto Arancibia
- Writers: Ernesto Arancibia, Alexis de Arancibia
- Stars: Juan Alighieri, Héctor Armendáriz and Cayetano Biondo
