= Reportaje a un cadáver =

- Release date: 1955
- Country: Argentina
- Language: Spanish

Reportaje a un cadáver is a 1955 Argentine film.
