= Rosita Díaz Gimeno =

Spanish actress

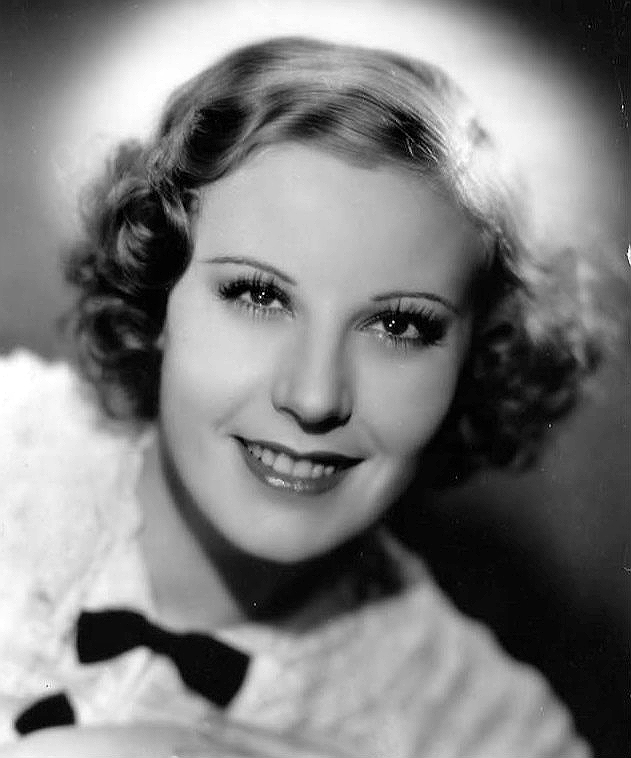
- Diaz in 1939
- Born: Rosa Díaz Gimeno; September 13, 1908; Madrid, Spain
- Died: August 23, 1986 (aged 77); New York City, U.S.
- Other names: Rosita Díaz Negrín
- Occupation: Actress
- Years active: 1934–1955
- Spouse: Juan Negrín Jr.

Rosita Díaz Gimeno (September 13, 1908 – August 23, 1986) was a Spanish stage and film actress from Madrid.

== Stage actress ==
Díaz Gimeno was educated at the Convent of the Sacred Heart in Madrid. She trained in theater at the conservatory of the Teatro Real. She appeared in thirty-five plays in Spain, beginning her career accompanied by G. Martinez Sierra, a Spanish playwright. Díaz Gimeno achieved fame as a stage actress in Spain and France.

== American films ==
Acquired by the Fox Film Company, Diaz Gimeno came to Hollywood in October 1934. She signed her contract in Paris, France. She made Rosa de Francia in 1935. The movie set a record in film by requiring Diaz Gimeno to sit in a tub filled with soap suds for nine hours, while shots were made. The same year she filmed Angelina o el honor de un brigadier. This production was immensely popular with audiences in Harlem, New York.

== Government informant ==
Diaz Gimeno was reported to have been executed as a spy by Spanish Insurgents in January 1937. She had been arrested at Córdoba, during the Spanish Civil War, in August 1936. She was released. Later she went to Seville, the southern headquarters of the insurgents. There she mixed in military circles. Gimeno was found to have been affiliated with a secret broadcast station which supplied the Spanish government with information regarding insurgent military plans.

Film actress Rosita Moreno received a cablegram on February 27, 1937. In answer to one she had sent to Segovia, the reply read: I am well. Fondest greetings. It was signed Rosita. Spanish police also denied that Gimeno had been shot or arrested. However they professed ignorance as to her whereabouts. She was located in Segovia and contracted to appear in films, returning to Hollywood on May 24, 1937.

== Late career ==
In 1948 Diaz Gimeno was forced to pay taxes to five governments-Morocco, Spain, France, the United States, and Mexico. At the time she was called Rosita Diaz Negrin. She was the wife of Dr. Juan Negrin Jr., son of former premier Juan Negrín of Loyalist Spain. Negrin was a New York brain surgeon. The couple became American citizens in 1953.

Diaz Gimeno starred in a Spanish production of The Teahouse of the August Moon, translated by Mexico's foremost playwright and close friend of the Negrin couple, Rodolfo Usigli in Mexico City, Mexico, in 1955. It was produced by Jean Dalrymple and Rita Allen of New York City. Rosita Díaz Gimeno played the part of Sakini, the cunning interpreter from Okinawa.

Rosita Diaz Gimeno died in 1986 in New York.

== Selected filmography ==
| Year | Title | Role | Notes |
|---|---|---|---|
| 1930 | A Lucky Man | | |
| 1931 | A Gentleman in Tails | Susana de Dussange | |
| 1933 | The Man Who Laughed at Love | | |
| 1934 | Our Lady of Sorrows | Dolores | |
| 1946 | Pepita Jiménez | Pepita Jiménez | |
| 1948 | Song of the Siren | | Final film role |
