= Radio Bar =

1936 film

- Directed by: Manuel Romero
- Written by: Manuel Romero
- Starring: Juan Carlos Thorry
- Cinematography: Francisco Múgica
- Edited by: Francisco Múgica
- Music by: Alberto Soifer
- Distributed by: AIA de la Plata; Lumiton; Paramount Pictures (US)
- Release date: September 10, 1936
- Running time: 83 minutes
- Country: Argentina
- Language: Spanish

Radio Bar is a 1936 Argentine musical film directed and written by Manuel Romero during the Golden Age of Argentine cinema. It is a tango film.

== Main cast ==
- Gloria Guzmán
- Olinda Bozán
- Carmen Lamas
- Alicia Barrié
- Alberto Vila
- Juan Carlos Thorry
- Marcos Caplán
- Susy Derqui
- Violeta Desmond
- Lydia Desmond
- Benita Puértolas
- José Ramírez
- Héctor Quintanilla
- Carlos Enríquez
- Roberto Blanco
- Juan Mangiante
- Paquita León
- Matilde Gómez
- María Zubarrián

== See also ==
- List of works by Manuel Romero
