= Osvaldo Martinez =

Osvaldo Martínez may refer to:

- Osvaldo Martínez, Paraguayan footballer
- Osvaldo Martínez (baseball), Puerto Rican baseball player
- Osvaldo Martinez (gymnast) (born 1985), Argentine gymnast; see Gymnastics at the 2018 South American Games
