= Benjamín Solari Parravicini =

Argentine artist and psychic (1898–1974)

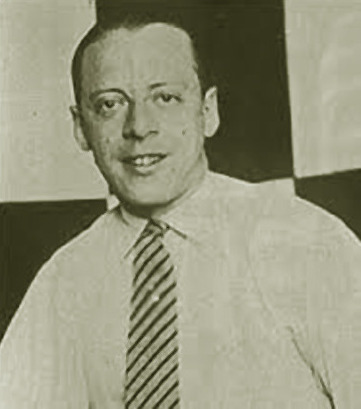
- Born: August 8, 1898; Buenos Aires, Argentina
- Died: December 13, 1974 (aged 76); Buenos Aires, Argentina
- Resting place: Cementerio de La Recoleta, Buenos Aires
- Occupation: Artist
- Known for: Prophetic drawings
- Parent(s): Dolores Parravicini Noriega; Benjamín Tomás Solari

Benjamín Solari Parravicini (August 8, 1898 – December 13, 1974) was an Argentine visual artist, known for his supposed psychic abilities to forecast future events. Among his claimed predictions were the launch of Sputnik 2, the advent of television, the development of artificial insemination, the September 11th terrorist attacks, the 1956 Suez Crisis, the Cuban Revolution and the rise of Fidel Castro, and many other historical events.

== Biography ==
Benjamín Solari Parravicini was born on August 8, 1898, in Buenos Aires, to Benjamín Tomás Solari and Dolores Parravicini Noriera, was the oldest of eight siblings and was nicknamed Pelón (Baldy) due to his baldness.

He dedicated his life to painting and had a pretty successful career; in 1927, during an art exhibition in Buenos Aires, Parravicini was congratulated by then President of Argentina, Marcelo Torcuato de Alvear, who was present in the display. Later on, he got an award at an international art display that took place in the capital city and was invited to exhibit some of his drawings in Liège, Belgium, where he won a gold medal and even impressed King Albert I, who bought one of his works.

He was also an art professor at the Spanish lyceum of Buenos Aires; and the city municipality appointed Parravicini as both manager of the Arts Department and director of the exhibition gallery, roles which he fulfilled for several years.

=== Artistic works (exhibitions) ===
- 1927 – Exposición comunal (communal exposition).
- 1929 – Amigos del Arte (friends of art).
- 1935 – Camuati
- 1947 – Asociación para la Promoción de las Artes (association for the promotion of arts).

== Paranormal abilities ==
Through his childhood, Parravicini claimed to have contact with fairies, angels, and duendes (a mythological creature similar to a goblin) and was allegedly able to find lost objects and even lost people with ease. This behavior worried his father (a psychiatrist), who had his son undertake several medical tests to prove if he had an illness of some sort, to negative results. Sometime later, the young Parravicini started talking about a "war that would go off in 14", which became the first of his several premonitions as World War I would begin that year.

Between 1936 and 1972, Parravicini made more than a thousand "prophetic" drawings, which he described as "psychographies". His supporters credit him with having accurately predicted various major world events, including the arrival of television, satellite communication, in vitro fertilization, that the first being in space would be a dog, and the September 11 attacks; the latter gained the artist worldwide attention in the aftermath of the attacks, with the image of the "prophecy" (from 1939) depicting two sketches of the Statue of Liberty, one with buildings going down on the background and a message that stated the following:

The freedom of North America will lose its light. Its torch won't illuminate like yesterday, and the monument will be attacked two times.

Parravicini claimed several times that, at first, due to his Catholic beliefs, he destroyed the drawings because they did not make sense to him, and that, while making the drawings, he felt that his hand was being guided by an external entity (which he said was his guardian angel, José Fray de Aragón) and that he heard a voice during the whole process.

== Alien abduction ==
According to one of his closest friends, ufologist Fabio Zerpa, Parravicini told him he was abducted by two whitish-eyed beings (similar in appearance to what would be later known as nordic aliens), who approached him while he was sitting in a sidewalk bank of the 9 de Julio avenue, in downtown Buenos Aires. A huge light then transported the three to a circle-shaped room, with luminous panels and a central tube in which the entities moved. One of them approached the artist and told him telepathically in Spanish, his native language: "You have to preach love. Universe is harmony. Your behavior is aggressive. We have several chosen ones. We will meet again". Parravicini was back on the same sidewalk bank he was abducted at three hours later, at 18:40 p.m.

== Ancestry ==
Ancestry of Benjamín Solari Parravicini

8. Francisco Solari; b. Italy
4. Justino Solari Costa; b. Argentina
9. Colomba Costa; b. Italy
2. Benjamín Tomás Solari Romero; b. Argentina
20. José Romero; b. Argentina
10. José María Romero; b. Argentina
5. Ninfa de la Trinidad Romero y Sánchez-Negrete; b. Argentina
22. Pedro Bernardino Sánchez Negrete Toledo; b. Argentina
11. Casilda Sánchez Negrete Ríos; b. Argentina
23. María Teresa Ríos; b. Argentina
1. Benjamín Ramón Solari Parravicini; b. Argentina
24. Nicola Parravicini di Casanova, marquis of Parravicini; b. Italy
12. Jacobo Emiliano Parravicini de Casanova y Botello, marquis of Parravicini; b. Spain
25. Ana María Botello Ponce; b. Spain
6. Emilio Parravicini y Nonell; b. Argentina
26. Juan Nonell Castellà; b. Spain
13. Dolores Bárbara Nonell y Montaner; b. Argentina
27. Dolores Montaner y Escobar; b. Argentina
3. Dolores Tomasa Parravicini y Noriega; b. Argentina
14. Domingo Saturnino Noriega; b. Argentina
7. Cornelia Noriega; b. Argentina
Gerónimo Terrón Caballero b. Argentina
15. Javiera Terrón; b. Argentina
Juliana Olguín b. Argentina
