= Pájaros de cristal =

- Release date: 1955
- Country: Argentina
- Language: Spanish

Pájaros de cristal is a 1955 Argentine film directed by Ernesto Arancibia. The film deals with the world of ballet.

== Cast ==
- Mecha Ortiz ..Irina Galowa
- Alba Arnova ...Vera Baralli
- Georges Rivière ...Miguel Legrand - Mitia
- Gloria Guzmán ...Betty Baralli
- Renée Dumas ...Carla
- Antonia Herrero ...Ljuba
- Fernando Siro ...Germán
