= The Boys Didn't Wear Hair Gel Before (1969 film) =

1969 Argentine drama film

Los muchachos de antes no usaban gomina
- Release date: 1969
- Running time: 115 minutes
- Country: Argentina
- Language: Spanish

The Boys Didn't Wear Hair Gel Before (Los muchachos de antes no usaban gomina) is a 1969 Argentine drama film. It is a remake of the 1937 film The Boys Didn't Wear Hair Gel Before, one of the biggest hits of the Golden Age of Argentine Cinema.

== Cast ==
- Rodolfo Bebán... Alberto
- Susana Campos ... La Rubia Mireya
- Osvaldo Miranda ... Ponce
- Carlos Estrada... El guapo Rivera
- Nora Cárpena ... Camila
- Sabina Olmos... Madre de Alberto
- Juan Carlos Dual
- Beba Bidart
