= Osvaldo Rodríguez =

Osvaldo Rodríguez may refer to:

- Osvaldo Rodríguez (poet) (1943–1996), Chilean poet and musician
- Osvaldo Rodríguez (Cuban musician)
- Osvaldo Rodríguez (footballer, born 1990), Costa Rican footballer
- Osvaldo Rodríguez (footballer, born 1996), Mexican footballer
