= Susy Derqui =

Argentine actress and cabaret performer

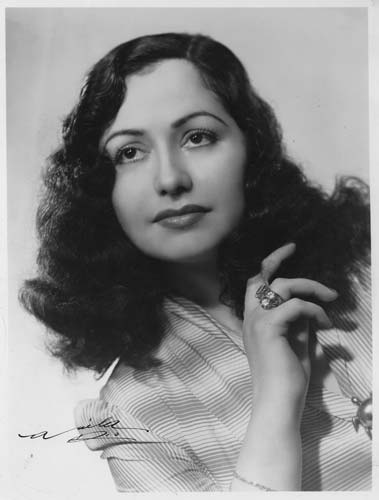
- Susy Derqui in 1939
- Other name: Sussy Derqui
- Occupation: Actress
- Years active: 1936–1955 (film)

Susy Derqui was an Argentine actress and cabaret performer.

== Selected filmography ==
- Radio Bar (1936)
- Outside the Law (1937)
- Margarita, Armando y su padre (1939)
- Vida nocturna (1955)

== Bibliography ==
- Toni, Luis Pedro. Evita de Los Millones. Corregidor, 2006.
