= Pedro Mata y Fontanet =

Spanish medical doctor

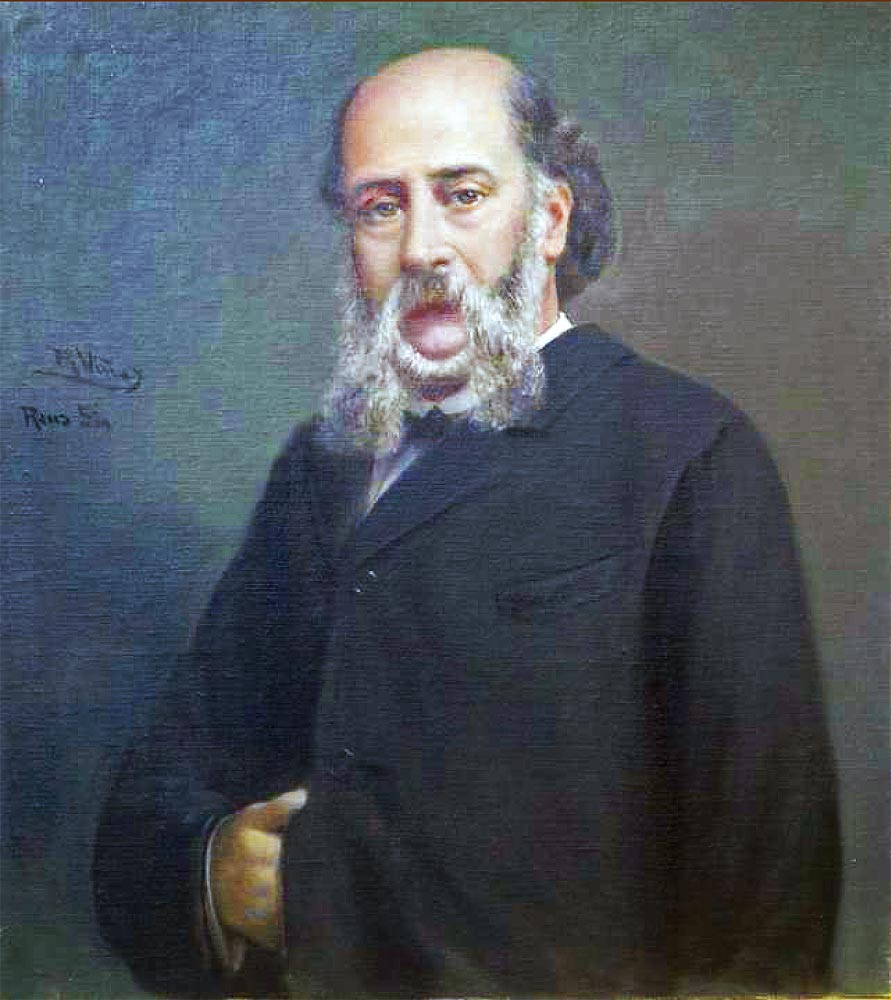
Doctor Pedro Mata y Fontanet.

Pedro Mata y Fontanet (1811-1877) was a Spanish medical doctor referenced by the author Jorge Luis Borges in his work "The Analytical Language of John Wilkins". Mata is cited as having written a book entitled Curso de lengua universal or The Study of Universal Language, which was purportedly written in Buenos Aires in 1886. Borges' piece on John Wilkins focused on an attempt at creating a universal language.

The calle del Doctor Mata, a street in Madrid, is named in honor of Pedro Mata y Fontanet.

Dr. Mata is also referenced, humorously (his family name means "[he] kills"), in Ángel Ganivet's novel Los trabajos del infatigable creador Pío Cid.
