= Osvaldo Miranda =

Osvaldo Miranda may refer to:

- Osvaldo Miranda (footballer) (born 1984), Argentine footballer
- Osvaldo Miranda (actor) (1915–2011), Argentine actor
- Osvaldo Miranda (fencer) (1887–?), Cuban fencer
