= Carmen Lamas =

Spanish-born singer

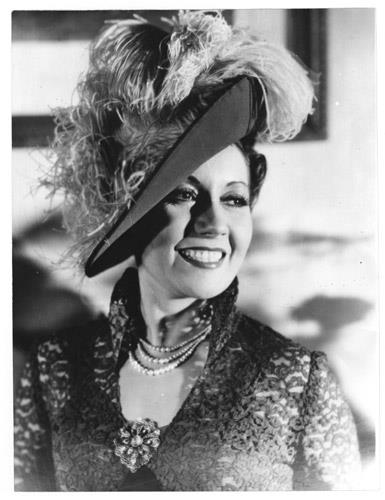
Carmen Lamas (1938)

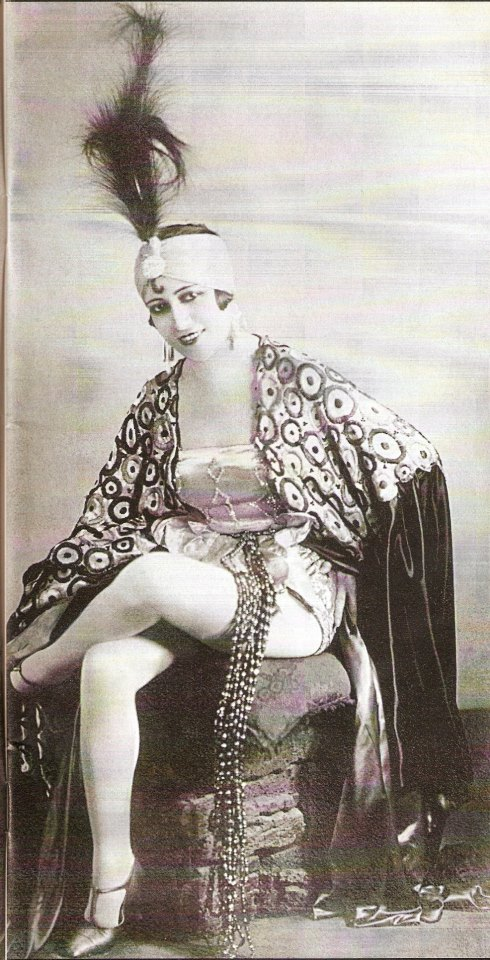
Carmen Lamas at the theatre (1935)

Carmen Lamas (1900 in Spain – 1990 in Buenos Aires) was a Spanish-born tango singer, and the first Spanish actress who made her career in Argentina. Lamas debuted in 1921 in a cast headed by his father, Miguel Lamas, Spanish actor and director. She was one of the first important figures of the Teatro Maipo, a vedette in the group known at that time as "Primera triple".

== Filmography ==
=== Movies ===
- 1936: Radio Bar
- 1939: Giácomo
- 1939: Margarita, Armando y su padre
- 1946: Chiruca

=== Theatre ===
- ¿Quién dijo miedo?
- Las alegres chicas del Maipo
- Me gustan todas
- Abajo los hombres
- La mejor revista
- Café Concierto 1900
- Gran cabalgata teatral
- Mujeres, Flores y Alegría
- El callejón de la alegría
- A Juan I de Ardula le han encajado la mula
- Un regalo del destino
- ¡Papá, cómprame un príncipe!
- ¡Qué quiere la Rasimi!
- El callejón de la alegría'
- Dos Virginias para Pablo
- ¡Papá, cómprame un príncipe!
- A Juan 1º de Ardula le han encajado la mula
