= The Boys of the Old Days Didn't Use Hair Gel (1937 film) =

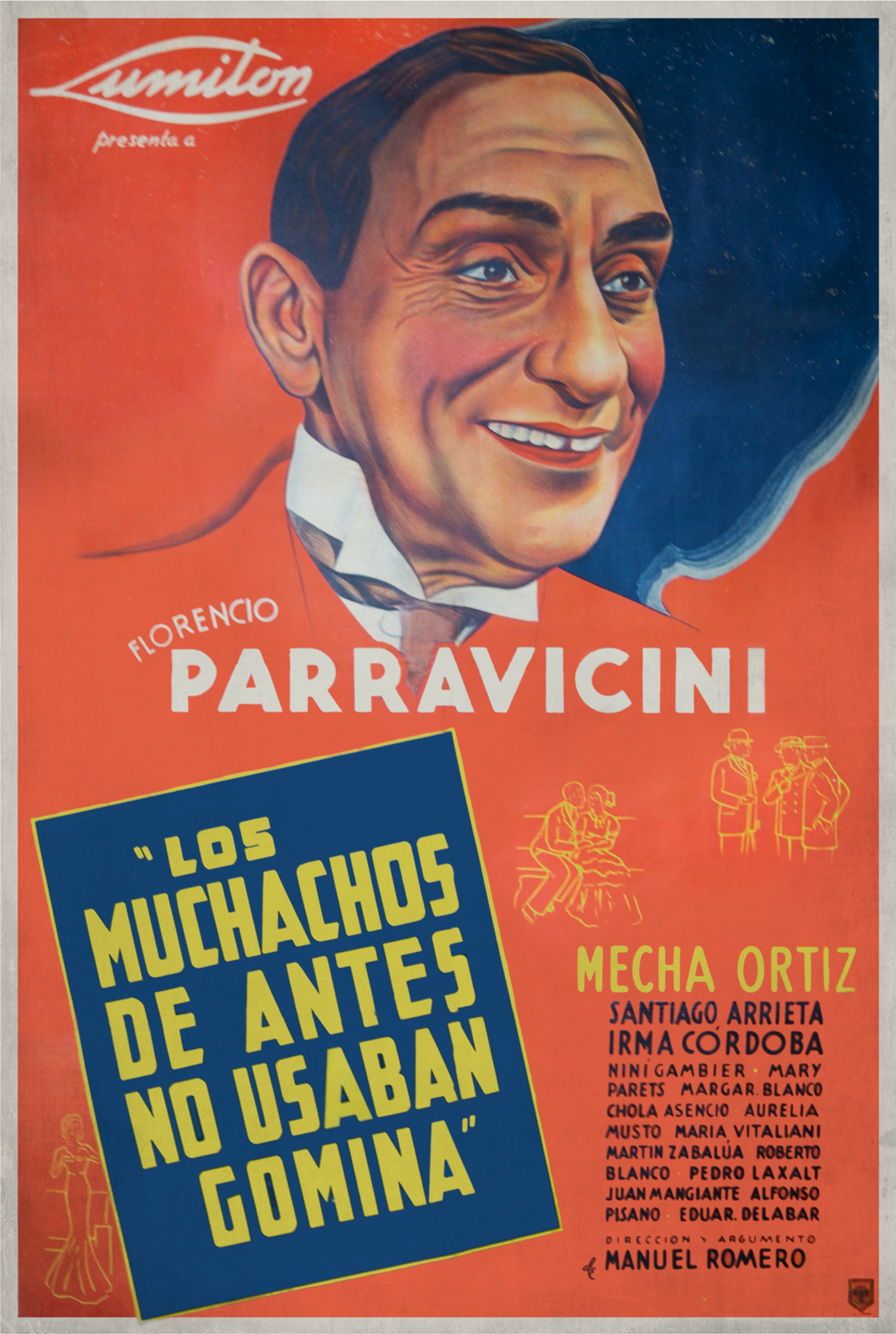
- Theatrical release poster
- Directed by: Manuel Romero
- Written by: Mario Bernard; Manuel Romero
- Starring: Florencio Parravicini; Mecha Ortiz; Santiago Arrieta; Irma Córdoba
- Cinematography: Francisco Múgica
- Edited by: Francisco Múgica
- Music by: Alberto Soifer
- Production company: Lumiton
- Distributed by: Lumiton
- Release date: 31 March 1937
- Running time: 90 minutes
- Country: Argentina
- Language: Spanish

The Boys of the Old Days Didn't Use Hair Gel (Spanish: Los muchachos de antes no usaban gomina) is a 1937 Argentine historical drama film directed and written by Manuel Romero and starring Florencio Parravicini, Mecha Ortiz and Santiago Arrieta. It is one of the most representative films of the Golden Age of Argentine cinema.

There is another version of the same name directed in 1969 by Enrique Carreras with a cast headed by Rodolfo Bebán and Susana Campos.

== Plot ==
The aristocratic Alberto Rosales (Arrieta) falls in love with the blond tango dancer Rubia Mireya (Ortiz) leaving his fiancée (Córdoba). His father convinces him to give her up and return to his respectable fiancée. Ten years later Alberto and Rubia meet again at a charitable event organized by his wife. He wants to rekindle the romance, but when his two children burst on to the scene, she leaves without a word. Though she still cares for him, she will not allow his children to become fatherless.

== Cast ==
- Florencio Parravicini as Ponce - Mocho
- Mecha Ortiz as La Rubia Mireya
- Santiago Arrieta as Alberto
- Irma Córdoba as Camila Peña
- Martín Zabalúa as Carlos Rosales
- Niní Gambier as Inés Rosales
- Alfonso Pisano as Euclides García Fuentes
- Mary Parets as Lucy Rosales
- Pedro Laxalt as Jorge Rosales
- Aurelia Musto as Sra.Rosales
- Hugo del Carril as El cantor
- María Vitaliani as Sra. Peña
- Amalia Bernabé as Amiga de Camila
- Fernando Borel as Jorge Newbery
- Eduardo de Labar as Hansen
- Homero Cárpena as Guapo Salinas
- Malisa Zini as Amiga de Camila
- Isabel Figlioli as Mujer del cabaret
- Jorge Lanza as Amigo de Rivera
- Carlos Enríquez as Vendedor de globos
- Osvaldo Miranda as Amigo de los Rosales
- Roberto Blanco

== Reception ==
The film's title alludes nostalgically to the past, referring to an era before young men began wearing hair gel which was commonplace by the mid-1930s. It was a popular success, one of the major hits of the Golden Age of Argentine Cinema. It marked the film debut of the actor and singer Hugo del Carril who quickly went on to become a leading star. The film was remade in 1969.

== See also ==
- List of works by Manuel Romero

== Bibliography ==
- Rist, Peter H. Historical Dictionary of South American Cinema. Rowman & Littlefield, 2014.
