= Miguel Faust Rocha =

Argentine stage and film actor

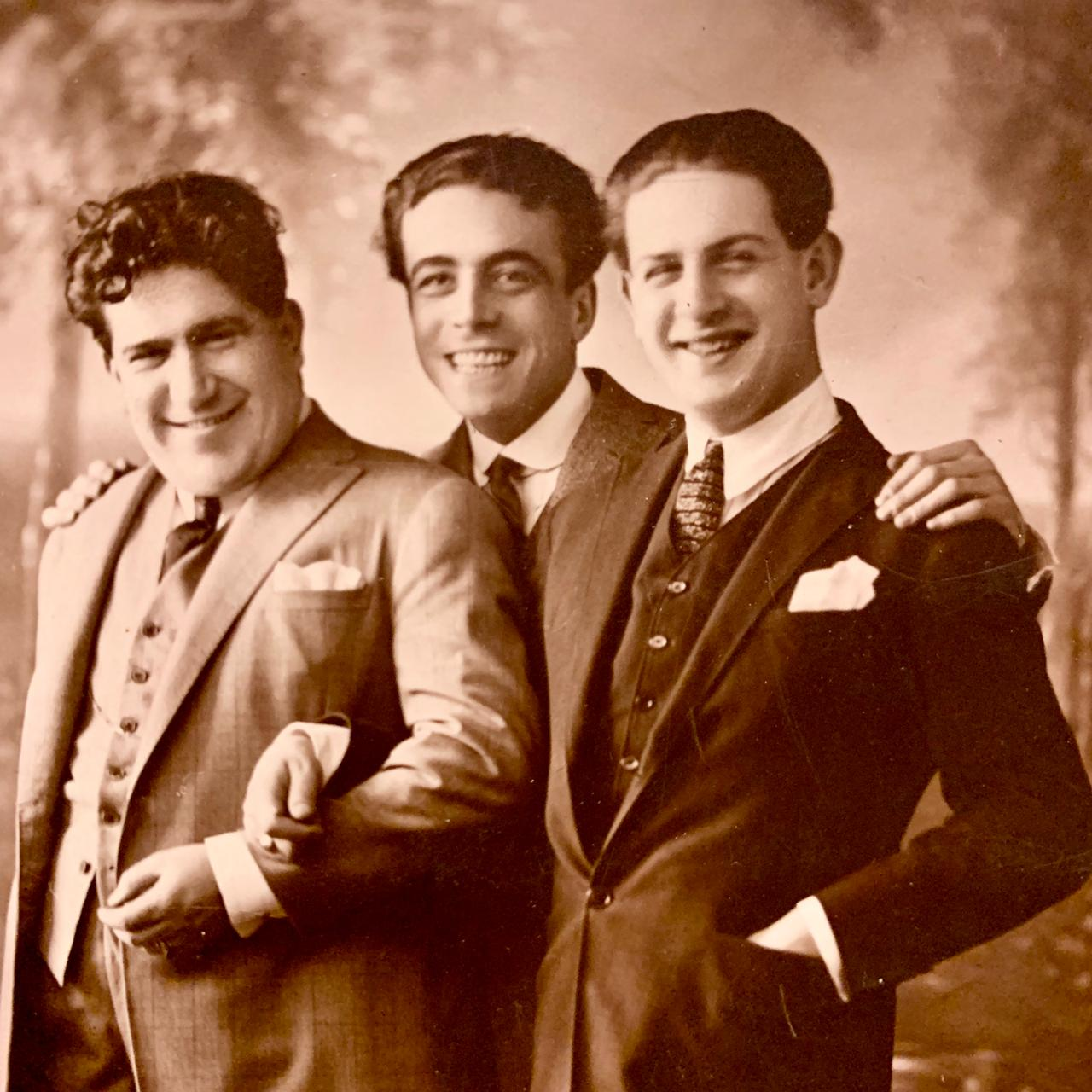
- Born: 6 August 1898; Buenos Aires, Argentina
- Died: 6 March 1961 (aged 62); Buenos Aires, Argentina
- Other name: Miguel Angel Faust Rocha
- Occupation: Actor
- Years active: 1925-1948 (film)

Miguel Faust Rocha (1898–1961) was an Argentine stage and film actor.

== Selected filmography ==
- Resurrection (Spanish-language version) (1931)
- Lost Kisses (1945)
- The Three Rats (1946)

== Bibliography ==
- Goble, Alan. The Complete Index to Literary Sources in Film. Walter de Gruyter, 1999.
