= Francella =

Francella is a surname. Notable people with the surname include:

- Guillermo Francella (born 1955), Argentine actor and comedian
- Johanna Francella (born 1993), Argentine actress
- Meaghan Francella (born 1982), American professional golfer
- Nicolás Francella (born 1990), Argentine actor
- Sister Francella Mary Griggs (1920–2012), Native American catholic nun
