= Pocho La Pantera =

Argentinian singer

Ernesto Aníbal Gauna Fonseca (29 November 1950 – 1 November 2016), known professionally as Pocho La Pantera (Spanish: Pocho the Panther), was an Argentine master of ceremonies, actor, singer of Argentine cumbia, and author of successes such as El hijo de Cuca (1990), Me dicen la pantera (1991) and El paso de la fiesta (2016).

== Biography ==
In addition to his musical work, Gauna, born in Buenos Aires and raised in Córdoba, performed in various activities throughout his life, from his beginnings as a student of theology in Australia until his appearances as an actor in various series, both in television series and online and offline.

He took his first steps in music in the 1980s. Along with Ricky Maravilla, Alcides, Lía Crucet, Gladys la bomba tucumana and Gilda, he was a benchmark in the genre of the cumbia in Argentina. He wrote songs such as "El hijo de Cuca", "Bailando con la gorda", "A mover el esqueleto", "La arañita", "Señorita diga quien es", "Cantinero le bajo la caña", "Me dicen la pantera", "Comprale un choripan", among many others.

His confession to his drug addiction and his eternal struggle with this problem determined, for several years on television media, his image. In 2015, photographs of him naked with tanned skin became popular on the internet and WhatsApp among young audiences.

A convert to evangelicalism, he married Viviana Basilia («La Griega»). Pastor Giménez, one of the best-known Evangelical pastors in Argentina, officiated his wedding. Although his passage by the Evangelical Church was rather short, he managed to record a cassette, two CDs and a video (VHS). In 2013, he recorded an advertisement for Pepsi company next to Argentine footballer Ezequiel Lavezzi.

He died in Buenos Aires at age 65 on November 1, 2016, as a result of renal carcinoma. He was hospitalized for a week in serious condition in the IMAC (high-complexity Medical Institute). On 21 October he published his last message on the social networking site Twitter: "Recuerden esto: ustedes me dieron todo. Gracias por el aguante." (in English: "Remember this: you gave me everything. Thank you for the support.")

== Filmography ==
- 2012: El vagoneta en el mundo del cine.

== Television shows ==
- 2016: La peluquería de don Mateo.
- 2015: Laten corazones.
- 2006: Sos mi vida, protagonist with Natalia Oreiro.
- 2002 - 2016: Pasión de sábado.
- 1998 - 2002: Siempre sábado
- 1996: 1,2,3, Ritmo, with Marcelo Gopar. Emitted by Canal 365 Series and Uno Visión.

== Theatre ==
- 2013: Los Magníficos - With Marixa Balli, Alcides and Pancho de la Sonora Colorada.
- 2013: "Hasta que la risa no se pare" - Teatro La Campana de Mar del Plata together with Guido Süller, Daniel Santillán, Jacobo Winograd, Ayelén Paleo, Valeria Degenaro, Guillermo Gramuglia, and Pablo Cabaleiro.
- 1991: Comedia musical estrenada in the "Teatro Metropolitan", with Sandra Smith, Bady, and Hector Vicari.

== Discography ==
Genre: Cumbia tropical

1. Pocho La Pantera (P) 1984 American Recording
2. Baila mi pueblo baila (P) 1985 American Recording
3. Gracias amigos (P) 1986 American Recording
4. El amo del tiempo (P) 1987 American Recording
5. El último de... Pocho La Pantera (P) 1988 American Recording
6. Arriba las palmas cantarando (P) 1989 Musica & Marketing
7. El hijo de cuca (P) 1990 Magenta
8. El espectacular (P) 1991 Magenta
9. Super bailanta (P) 1992 Magenta
10. La cuca que la tiro (P) 1993 Magenta
11. Mi niña bonita (P) 1994 Magenta
12. La leyenda continúa (P) 1996 Magenta
13. Vamos Argentina (P) 2014 Akkua Management

Genre: Christian ballads

1. Se fue De La Rúa pero vos me afilás la ganzúa (Plena crísis Argentina, 2001)
2. Mi niña bonita (2002)
3. Pocho León De Juda (música cristiana) (Paraíso Record, 2005).
4. Con una mano en el corazón (música cristiana) (Producciones Peniel)
5. A Cara Y Cruz (música cristiana) (Phono Disc Record)
6. A Mi Manguera... Gracias Por El Aguante (De la Buena Estrella, 2011)
7. Me dicen el transgresor de la teoría existencialista (De la Buena Estrella, 2011)
8. Martes, no te cases ni te embarques (Boeri Record, 2012)

== Other CDs ==
1. Boca Campeón (1990) with Isabelita
2. Top 10 Vol. 2 (1991): El gallito ciego
3. Increíble (1991): El descuartetizador, Que piña que tiene Pedro y La foto del cassette
4. Increíble Vol. 2 (1991): Mil horas y No se vivir si tu no estas

== Videos ==
- VHS - Pocho La Pantera - Tiempos De Cambio
- Back the siam - Pocho La Pantera como el mismo- Película
- Pocho La Pantera - El Paso De La Fiesta - Todos Tenemos Uno
