= List of Argentine films of 1992 =

A list of films produced in Argentina in 1992:

Argentine films of 1992
Title	Director	Release	Genre
A - Z
Al filo de la ley	Juan Carlos Desanzo	7 May	
Ángeles Ángeles	Raúl Perrone	3 December	
Cuatro caras para Victoria	Oscar Barney Finn	10 December	
¿Dónde estás amor de mi vida que no te puedo encontrar?	Juan José Jusid	6 August	
Extermineitors IV: Como hermanos gemelos	Carlos Galettini	23 January	
El lado oscuro del corazón	Eliseo Subiela	21 May	
La peste	Luis Puenzo	26 August	
La pluma del ángel	Néstor Paternostro	17 September	
Rompecorazones	Jorge Stamadianos	3 April	
Siempre es difícil volver a casa	Jorge Polaco	4 June	
Suave como el terciopelo	Raúl Perrone	April	
Un lugar en el mundo	Adolfo Aristarain	9 April	
El viaje	Fernando Solanas	30 April	

== External links and references ==
- Argentine films of 1992 at the Internet Movie Database
