= Daniel Alarcón =

Peruvian-American novelist, journalist and radio producer

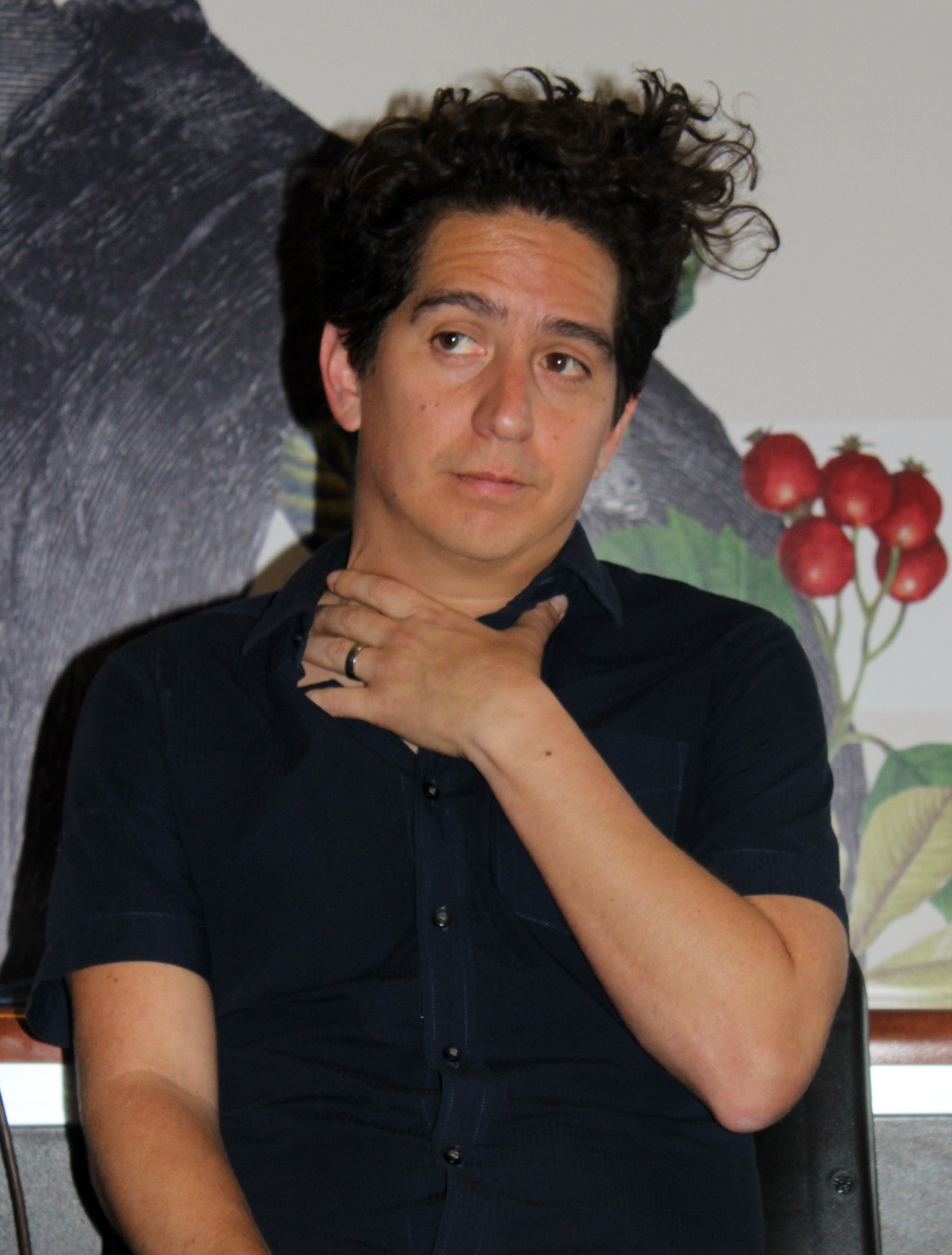
- Alarcón in 2018
- Born: 1977 (age 48–49); Lima, Peru
- Education: Columbia University (BA); University of Iowa (MFA)
- Occupations: Writer; journalist; radio producer
- Spouse: Carolina Guerrero
- Children: León & Eliseo
- Writing career
- Notable awards: MacArthur Fellowship (2021)
- Website: radioambulante.org

Daniel Alarcón (born 1977 in Lima, Peru) is a Peruvian-American novelist, journalist and radio producer. He is co-founder, host and executive producer of Radio Ambulante, a Spanish language podcast distributed by NPR. Currently, he is an assistant professor of broadcast journalism at the Columbia University Graduate School of Journalism and writes about Latin America for The New Yorker.

He began his career writing fiction, publishing stories in magazines like The New Yorker, Granta, Virginia Quarterly Review and elsewhere, and his short stories have been widely anthologized. He served as associate editor of the Peruvian magazine Etiqueta Negra until 2015. He is a former Fulbright Scholar to Peru, and a 2011 Artist in Residence at the Headlands Center for the Arts. His novel At Night We Walk in Circles was published by Riverhead Books in October 2013. His most recent story collection, The King is Always Above the People, was long-listed for the National Book Award in 2018, and won the 2019 Clarke Prize in Fiction. He received the MacArthur 'Genius Grant' in 2021.

== Biography ==
Alarcón, a native of Peru, was raised from the age of 3, in Birmingham, Alabama, and is an alumnus of Indian Springs School. As a high schooler, he attended the Telluride Association Summer Program. He earned a bachelor's degree in anthropology from Columbia University in 1999 and a master of fine arts degree in fiction from the Iowa Writers' Workshop in 2004. He has studied in Ghana and been a public school teacher in New York City. He was a high school classmate of novelist John Green.

His first book, War by Candlelight, was a finalist for the 2006 PEN/Hemingway Foundation Award. In 2008, he was awarded a Guggenheim Fellowship, a Lannan Fellowship, named a "Best Young American Novelist" by Granta magazine, and one of 39 under 39 Latin American Novelists. In 2010, he was also recognized by The New Yorker as one of 20 promising writers under 40.

Alarcón's debut novel, Lost City Radio, was published 2007, and has been translated into Spanish, Portuguese, French, German, Dutch, Greek, Italian, Serbian, Turkish, and Japanese. The German translation of Lost City Radio by Friedericke Meltendorf received the International Literature Award from the Haus der Kulturen der Welt. In 2009, he published a collection of short stories, El rey está siempre por encima del pueblo (The king is always above the people), and the following year, Ciudad de payasos, a graphic novel adapted from his 2003 story City of Clowns, with illustrations by Peruvian artist Sheila Alvarado.

In 2011, he co-founded Radio Ambulante with his wife Carolina Guerrero, along with Camila Segura, Martina Castro and Annie Correal.

In 2013, his second novel, At Night We Walk in Circles, was published to critical acclaim.

In 2021, he was awarded a MacArthur Fellowship.

In 2024, Alarcón hosted The Good Whale, a six-episode podcast from The New York Times and Serial Productions about the orca Keiko, who portrayed Willy in the 1993 film Free Willy.

In 2026, Alarcón and cohost John Green began a podcast about international football in the lead up to the 2026 World Cup called The Away End.

Alarcón resides in New York City and teaches at Columbia University as an associate professor of journalism.

== Bibliography ==
=== Novels ===
- Lost City Radio (2007)
- At Night We Walk in Circles (Riverhead Books, 2013)

=== Short fiction ===
Collections

- War by Candlelight: Stories (2005)
- The King Is Always Above the People (2017)
- El Rey siempre está por encima del pueblo Editorial Sexto Piso, Mexico City, Mexico, 2009

Anthologies (edited)

- Zoetrope All Story: The Latin American Issue. A compilation of stories by Latin American writers. Co-edited with Diego Trelles Paz. Spring 2009

Stories

Title	Year	First published	Reprinted/collected	Notes
"City of Clowns"		The New Yorker		Adapted as a 2009 Peruvian short film

- "Lima, Peru, July 28, 1979", Virginia Quarterly Review
- "The King Is Always Above the People", Granta
- "The Bridge". Granta. 103 (Autumn): 181–212. 2008.
- "The Provincials", Granta
- The Composer, Virginia Quarterly Review

=== Graphic novels ===
- City of Clowns. Illustrated by Sheila Alvarado. Riverhead Books. 2015. ISBN 978-1-59463-333-1. (Graphic novel adaptation of short story)

=== Non-fiction ===
- "What kind of Latino am I?". Salon. May 24, 2005.
- "Let's go, country: The new Latin left comes to Peru". Harper's. September 2006.
- "Lost in Translation". Granta. January 23, 2009.
- "The Inauguration". Granta. January 27, 2009.
- "Life Among the Pirates". Granta (109: Work). Winter 2009.
- The secret miracle : the novelist's handbook. New York: Henry Holt. 2010.
- "The Ground Floor". Granta (117: Horror). Autumn 2011. (Subscription Required)
- "A Peruvian Soccer Fan in Exile". The New Yorker. November 13, 2017
- "The collapse at Arecibo : the loss of Puerto Rico's iconic telescope". Annals of Astronomy. The New Yorker. 97 (7): 16–20. April 5, 2021.

== Awards ==
- Recipient of a Whiting Award in 2004 for fiction
- One of 7 finalists for the Sargent Sr. First Novel Prize, Mercantile Library For Fiction, 2007
- 2009 International Literature Award – House of World Cultures (Berlin, Germany)
- The King Is Always Above the People, was chosen as one of three 2017 finalists for The Story Prize.
- 2021 MacArthur Fellowship
