= Ricky Maravilla =

Argentine tropical music singer and composer (born 1955)

- Also known as: Riki Maravilla
- Born: Luis Ricardo Aguirre; February 7, 1955 (age 71); Salta, Argentina
- Genres: Argentine cumbia, tropical music
- Occupations: Singer, musician, composer
- Instruments: Vocals, guitar
- Years active: 1976–present
- Label: Leader Music
- Website: www.rickymaravilla.com

Ricky Maravilla (also spelled Riki Maravilla; born Luis Ricardo Aguirre, 7 February 1955) is an Argentine singer, musician and composer of tropical music. He is associated with the Argentine movida tropical and is known for songs such as "El Hombre Gato", "Salvaje, soy salvaje" and "Qué tendrá el petiso". In 1995, he received a Konex Award in the Bailanta/Cuarteto category.

== Life and career ==
Aguirre had originally trained in electronics and communications, and at one point had work prospects in Australia. He later said that he did not initially plan to become a singer, but instead a technician. After adolescence he had to choose between continuing his technical career and signing a recording contract with his group Maravilla Tropical; he chose music and adopted his stage name from the group's name.

During the 1980s, Maravilla became associated with the growth of the Argentine movida tropical. Early in the decade he recorded "Cuide bien a su marido", which gave him his first television appearances. In 1986, while recording for Leader Music, he released "El Hombre Gato", which became his first major success in northern Argentina. It was followed by "La pelea del siglo", a song framed as an allegory of the struggle between good and evil.

In 1988, he released Salvaje, issued by Leader Music, one of the labels associated with the Argentine bailantero scene. Its lead single, "Salvaje, soy salvaje", written by Rodolfo Garavagno, helped widen his audience in discos and dance venues. Other songs from the album included "Camarón", "El Gallo y la Pata" and "Caramelo de Limón". The success of the album led to more performances in the Greater Buenos Aires area, and in the summer of 1989 he debuted in Punta del Este, Uruguay.

At the time, Maravilla was also a featured performer on a widely watched Canal 13 television programme devoted to cumbia and guaracha rhythms, hosted by Adolfo Casini and Sandra Smith, alongside artists such as Adrián y Los Dados Negros, Alcides, Gladys "La Bomba Tucumana", Lía Crucet, Los Dinos and Grupo Malagata. The music video for "Salvaje, soy salvaje" circulated widely in Argentina and helped increase his national profile.

In 1989, songwriter Fabio Espinosa composed "Qué tendrá el petiso" for Maravilla; the song became a national hit and consolidated his popularity. His repertoire also drew on songs by composers such as Rodolfo Garavagno, Henry Nelson, Miguel Ángel Escalante, Nazareno, Fabio Espinosa and Taco Morales.

In 1995, he received a Konex Award for his work during the previous decade as a singer in the bailanta/cuarteto field.

== Political candidacy ==
In 1999, Maravilla announced that he would run for mayor of Salta as a Peronist candidate in the 9 May elections. He later withdrew from the race before election day.

== Discography ==
=== Studio albums ===
- Y los Dueños del Baile (1980; MICSA) – first LP
- El pavo y la pava (1984; Far Producciones)
- El hombre gato (1986; Leader Music)
- La pelea del siglo (1986; Leader Music)
- Salvaje (1988; Leader Music)
- La Marca (1989; Leader Music)
- Único (1990; Leader Music)
- Imbatible (1990; Magenta)
- Síganme bailando (1992; Leader Music)
- Con amor para mi gente (1993; Leader Music)
- El Amarrete (1994; Columbia)
- La octava maravilla (1995; Leader Music)
- 10 años de Maravilla (1996; Leader Music)
- ¡Atención! Preparados para la joda (1997; Leader Music)
- La Petisa (1998; Leader Music)
- La gente que quiere fiesta (2000; Leader Music)
- Un clásico (2002)
- Liderando la fiesta con Riki Maravilla (2003; Leader Music)
- Que llueva plata (2005; Discos Procom S.R.L.)
- Mejor imposible (2006; Proel Music)
- Y que siga la pachanga (2009; Fred Records S.R.L.)
- Que siga la pachanga (2010; Fred Records S.R.L.)
- Mejor imposible (2013; Proel Music)
- Maravilloso (2015; Producciones Utopia)

=== Compilation albums ===
- Majestuoso (1989; compilation including three previously unreleased tracks, among them "Cuidado la bomba"; Leader Music)
- Majestuoso vol. 2 (1990; compilation including three previously unreleased tracks, among them "Estás enamoradita"; Leader Music)
- Lo mejor de Riki Maravilla (1990; Música & Marketing)
- Majestuoso vol. 3 (1991; compilation including three previously unreleased tracks, among them "Se casó el Petiso"; Leader Music)
- 16 Grandes Éxitos (1992; Leader Music)
- Majestuoso vol. 4 (1994; compilation including three previously unreleased tracks, among them "El amarrete"; Leader Music)
- Discos de Oro (1995)
- 20 Grandes Éxitos (2007; Leader Music)
- Megamix - 24 Super Hits (2008; Leader Music)

=== Collaborative albums ===
- Invencibles (1989; with Las Primas; CBS)
- Juntos (1994; with Alcides; Magenta)

== Filmography ==
- Extermineitors IV: Como hermanos gemelos (1992) – himself
