= Martina Castro =

American journalist, editor, and producer

- Born: 1982 (age 43–44); Maryland, United States
- Education: Amherst College
- Occupations: Journalist, editor, producer, educator
- Website: martinacastro.com

Martina Castro is a Uruguayan-American audio journalist, editor, producer, and educator. She is the CEO and founder of Adonde Media, a podcast production company and host of the Duolingo Spanish and The Vivo Songbook Podcasts. She co-founded and produced Radio Ambulante, the first Spanish-language podcast distributed by NPR.

== Early life and education ==
Castro was born in 1982 in Maryland to a mother and father from Montevideo, Uruguay. As a young child, she first spoke Spanish and then learned English, and then immersed herself in Spanish during a month-long visit to Uruguay when she was 13, after which she has said she began to think in Spanish. Throughout her childhood, she regularly visited her family in Uruguay.

Castro attended Thomas Jefferson High School for Science and Technology in Alexandria, Virginia, and then attended Amherst College. While in college, Castro wrote the first blog for NPR's Next Generation Radio program. Castro graduated from Amherst in 2004, majoring in women's and gender studies.

== Career ==
After graduating college, Castro had an internship at NPR, and then worked at NPR for four and a half years on a variety of NPR's newsprograms. After NPR, she worked at KALW, an NPR member station in San Francisco, California. At KALW, she was a managing editor of the KALW show Crosscurrents and produced a series titled Audiophiles.

In 2011, Castro co-founded Radio Ambulante with Daniel Alarcón, Carolina Guerrero, and Annie Correal; the show is now distributed by NPR, and Castro also worked as a sound designer for the project. Castro has also worked independently on other projects for All Things Considered and Morning Edition.

In 2015, Castro received a Fulbright grant to teach the art of audio storytelling at the University of Montevideo in Uruguay. She then moved to Chile and applied to the incubator program StartUp Chile. In that program, she started Adonde Media, a global production company focused on podcasts in Spanish.

Since its founding in 2017, Adonde Media clients have included Duolingo, TED, Spotify, Vice News, and Georgetown University. In 2017, the Duolingo Spanish Podcast launched, hosted and co-produced by Castro, to support English speakers learning Spanish, using true first-person stories from around the Spanish-speaking world. In 2020, Castro narrated a six-part series titled "El Gran Robo Argentino" ("The Great Argentine Heist") on the Duolingo Spanish Podcast, focused on the true story of a 2006 bank robbery in Argentina, with interviews of people related to the historical event.

Castro has also focused on data collection about podcast user interests and habits; in 2019, the community of Spanish language podcasters that she co-founded called Podcaster@s, conducted the first collaborative podcast listener survey, and in 2020, Adonde Media was a funder of the first U.S. Latino Podcast Listener Report by Edison Research.

In 2020, Adonde Media announced it would produce and distribute the fifth season of the Spanish-language podcast, Las Raras, with Castro as the executive producer. Castro was the executive producer of the Las Raras episode "Cruces en el desierto" (Crosses in the Desert), which won the 2020 Best Audio Documentary award from the International Documentary Association. In 2021, Adonde Media and Hrishikesh Hirway announced their partnership with support from PRX's Radiotopia to produce a spinoff of Song Exploder, titled Canción Exploder, for Spanish-speaking audiences.

== Awards and honors ==
- 2010 New Voices Scholar, Association of Independents in Radio
- 2014 National Edward R. Murrow award for News Documentary (host, editor, and producer of The Race to an Emergency)
- 2020 Best Audio Documentary award, International Documentary Association (executive producer of Crosses in the Desert / Cruces en el desierto)
