= All Hail (film) =

2022 Argentine comedy-drama film

- Netflix release poster
- Spanish: Granizo
- Directed by: Marcos Carnevale
- Written by: Nicolás Giacobone; Fernando Balmayor
- Starring: Guillermo Francella; Norman Briski; Romina Fernandes
- Cinematography: Horacio Maira
- Edited by: Luis Barros
- Music by: Gustavo Pomeranec
- Production companies: Infinity Hill; Kuarzo Entertainment Argentina; Leyenda Films
- Distributed by: Netflix
- Release date: 30 March 2022
- Running time: 118 minutes
- Country: Argentina
- Language: Spanish

All Hail (Spanish: Granizo) is a 2022 Argentine comedy-drama film directed by Marcos Carnevale and written by Nicolás Giacobone and Fernando Balmayor. Starring Guillermo Francella, Norman Briski and Romina Fernandes.

== Plot ==
After failing to predict a destructive hailstorm, a famous meteorologist flees to his hometown and soon finds himself on a journey of self-discovery.

== Cast ==
- Guillermo Francella as Miguel Flores
- Peto Menahem as Luis
- Romina Fernandes as Carla
- Martín Seefeld as Gustavo
- Nicolás Scarpino as Maxi
- Laura Fernández as Mery Oliva
- Norman Briski as Don José
- Eugenia Guerty as Marisa
- Viviana Saccone as Jimena
- Pompeyo Audivert as Alonso
- Horacio Fernández as Bernardo
