= Nicolás Francella =

Argentine actor, singer, and television producer (born 1990)

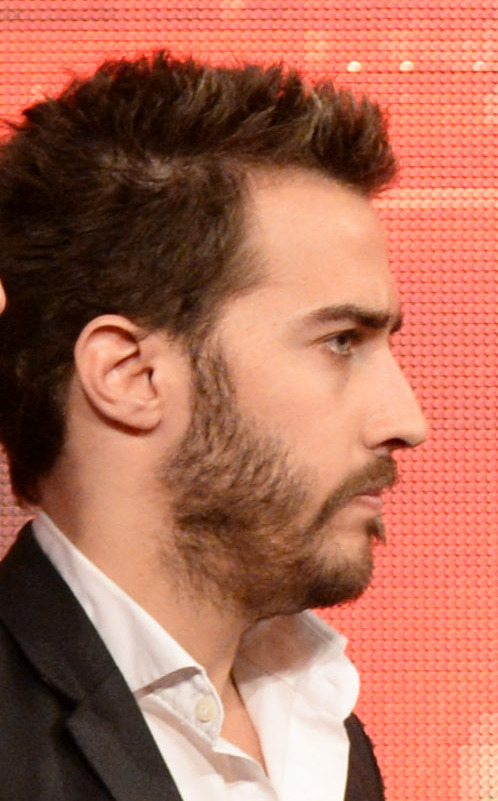
- Born: Nicolás Martín Francella; October 22, 1990 (age 34); Buenos Aires, Argentina
- Occupations: Actor; singer; television producer
- Years active: 2000–present
- Height: 1.70 m (5 ft 7 in)
- Parents: Guillermo Francella; Marynés Breña
- Relatives: Johanna Francella (sister)

Nicolás Martín Francella (born October 22, 1990) is an Argentine male actor, singer and television producer. He is the son of the famous actor, Guillermo Francella.

== Early life ==
Francella was born Nicolás Martín Francella on October 22, 1990 in Buenos Aires, Argentina.

== Career ==
Before becoming an actor Nicolás went through different careers, particularly as a creative in advertising, while he studied theater at night. He worked on the production of El hombre de tu vida. In 2013, he debuted as an actor in the Argentine film directed by Marcos Carnevale and produced by Telefe, Corazón de León.

From 2013 to 2014, he was one of the protagonist of the youth television series Aliados. From 2014 to 2015, he was part of the cast of the television series Viudas e hijos del Rock and Roll. In 2015, he debuted in theater in the play Madre e hijos along with Selva Aleman and Sergio Surraco. In 2017, he had a small part in the television series Quiero vivir a tu lado. From 2017 to 2018, he was part of the cast of the television series Las Estrellas (telenovela). In 2019, he was part of the cast of the television series Pequeña Victoria.

== Filmography ==
=== Movies ===
Year	Movie	Character	Director
2000	Papá es un Ídolo	Tomás	Juan José Jusid
2013	Corazón de León	Tomás "Toto" Godoy	Marcos Carnevale
2017	Los padecientes	Javier Vanussi	Nicolás Tuozzo
2017	Maracaibo	Ricki	Miguel Ángel Rocca
2019	El cuento de las comadrejas	Francisco Gourmand	Juan José Campanella
2020	Hasta el cielo ida y vuelta		Sebastián Pivotto
2022	En la mira	Axel Brigante	Ricardo Hornos and Carlos Gil

=== Television ===
Year	Movie	Character	Channel
2011-2012	El hombre de tu vida		Telefe
2013-2014	Aliados	Matías Arce / Inti	Telefe
2014	La celebración	Tomás	Telefe
2014-2015	Viudas e hijos del Rock and Roll	Federico Ventura / Federico Roch	Telefe
2017	Quiero vivir a tu lado	Daniel Murúa	Canal 13
2017-2018	Las Estrellas (telenovela)	Federico Alcántara	Canal 13
2019	Pequeña Victoria	Ariel Botti	Telefe
2020	Alta mar	Héctor Birabent	Netflix
2021	Pequeñas Victorias	Ariel Botti	Telefe / Amazon Prime Video
2022	María Marta, el crimen del country	Matías Centeno	HBO Max

=== Theater ===
Year	Title	Character	Director	Theater
2014	Aliados	Matías Arce / Inti	Cris Morena	Teatro Gran Rex
2015-2016	Madre e hijos			Multiteatro

== Awards and nominations ==
Year	Award	Category	Work	Result
2013	Nickelodeon Kids' Choice Awards Argentina	Revelation	Aliados	Nominated
2013	Sur Award	Best Revelation Actor	Corazón de León	Winner
2013	Martín Fierro Awards	Revelation Artist	Aliados	Nominated
2017	Notirey Awards	Supporting Actor	Las Estrellas (telenovela)	Winner
