= Radio Ambulante =

Spanish-language podcast

Radio Ambulante is a Spanish-language podcast which publishes stories about Latin America. It was created primarily by the Peruvian writer Daniel Alarcón. The first three seasons were launched in 2012, and since 2016, Radio Ambulante has been distributed weekly by National Public Radio.

== Format ==
Radio Ambulante is a narrative podcast based in San Francisco, which combines storytelling with investigative journalism. Among other things, it deals with themes like human rights, immigration, political and socioeconomic crises, gender identity and mental health. It publishes 24 episodes in each season, generally between 25 and 55 minutes. As of May 2019, it had produced almost 140 episodes.

== History ==
In 2007, the BBC invited Daniel Alarcón to make a radio documentary about the migration of Peruvians from the Andes to Lima. The final product was published in English, and many of the Spanish interviews that he had done weren't used or were dubbed over by actors. Later, in an interview with The New York Times, Alarcón recalled being frustrated by having to tell a story from Latin America without more Spanish-speaking people.

The idea to create Radio Ambulante came on January 11, 2011, in San Francisco, according to Alarcón and Carolina Guerrero (the CEO). Months later, the journalist Annie Correal became the cofounder. They also hired Martina Castro as cofounder and sound designer for the podcast, and in January 2012, Camila Segura joined as well.

With a team of five employees and a pilot season, they launched a Kickstarter campaign to raise money for the first season. The campaign received more than 600 donations, which totaled to over $46,000.

As of 2015, the podcast has 1.5 million annual downloads. In 2016 they joined National Public Radio, the public radio station of the United States, and since then the show has had over 5 million annual downloads and a team of 23 employees.

== Collaborations ==
Radio Ambulante has collaborated with other organizations to create content, such as Radiolab, Univisión Data, Soros Justice Fellowship, and the Pulitzer Center for Crisis Reporting. They also worked with the writing Silvia Viñas, who also wrote an article for The New York Times about her experience on the show.

== Other projects ==
=== Listening Clubs ===
Listening Clubs are a new project of Radio Ambulante, which were launched in February 2019. The goal is for listeners to meet up and talk about Radio Ambulante episodes and their relationship to the communities surrounding the clubs themselves. The project started in five pilot cities: New York, Mexico City, Medellín, San José, and Quito. Subsequently, more were introduced in Bogotá, Lima, Guatemala City and Madrid.

=== Radio Ambulante School ===
Radio Ambulante School is a space for learning to create in an audio format. It covers the basic principles of podcasting, from how to find a story to record to the basics of Hindenburg Pro, the program used by Radio Ambulante to edit their episodes. Radio Ambulante School also collaborates with Transom.org, an organization which has shared and translated their articles to help for a community of Spanish-speaking journalists.

=== Podcast Club ===
The Podcast Club is a private group in Facebook which shares and discusses the episodes of Radio Ambulante every week. They also recommend other podcasts in the regions, good practices for telling stories by audio, or other content related to storytelling or the theme of the current episode. Every week they organize videoconferences with the producers of the episode, or at least with some of the most important people in that week's story.

== Awards ==
- 2014: Gabriel García Márquez Prize for Journalism, in the category of innovation.
- 2017: Simón Bolivar National Journalism Prize, in the category of radio investigative journalism. Episode: "Doctor, is this normal?"
- 2017: Best Foreign Language Award, Third Coast Festival, Episode: "The Cassettes from Exile."
- 2020: Best Spanish Language Podcast, iHeartRadio Podcast Awards

== See also ==
- Institute for Nonprofit News (member)
