= Paula Reca =

- Born: April 10, 1989 (age 37); Buenos Aires, Argentina
- Education: New York University Tisch School of the Arts , Royal Academy of Dramatic Arts
- Occupation: Actress
- Years active: 2009–present
- Awards: ACE Theatre Award, HUGO Theatre award

Paula Reca (born April 10, 1989) is a film, theatre and television actress raised in Buenos Aires. She got her BFA in drama from NYU Tisch School of the Arts and her classical theatre training from RADA, London. Paula has won the ACE Theatre Award (Argentina's most prestigious theatre awards; equivalent to a TONY Award) for Outstanding Performance in Theatre and the HUGO Theatre award for Best Leading Actress. In film Paula starred in "Tampoco Tan Grandes", which she produced and wrote with her brother Maximo. "Tampoco Tan Grandes" won Best Feature Film at the Mar del Plata International Film Festival 2018 and screened at Shanghai International Film Festival, Malaga International Film Festival, Santa Barbara International Film Festival and Chicago Latin Film Festival. Paula also starred in "Belgrano" by Juan Campanella, Academy Award Winner Director for Best Foreign Film 2010; in "Veredas" by Fernando Cricenti which won the special mention from the Jury at the Mar del Plata International Film Festival and screened at BAFICI 2017; and in Gaspar Scheuer's "Delfin" produced by Tarea Fina which screened at Cannes Ecrans Junior 2019. In theatre Paula played the GIRL in ONCE at Teatro Metropolitan Sura; the first Spanish adaptation of the successful Broadway musical and Academy Award-winning film (Won HUGO Theatre award for Best Actress). Paula played Sophie in "Mamma Mía!" directed by Broadway's associate director Robert Mcqueen (won ACE award for Outstanding Performance) and played Louisa in "The Sound of Music" directed by Jonathan Butterell (Broadway, "The Light in the Piazza") with Lighting Design by Tony Award Winner Rick Fisher. Both musicals at Teatro Opera in Buenos Aires (1800-seat theatre). Her TV credits playing leading roles include: "Casi Angeles", "Aliados", "German, Ultimas Vinetas" and "Aliados Season 2". Both "Casi Angeles" and "Aliados" aired in over 20 countries around the world. Paula was the face of two Argentine fashion campaigns. In 2014 of BOLIVIA and in 2015 of AMORES TRASH COUTURE.

== Biography ==
Paula Reca was born in Buenos Aires, Argentina. She graduated from New York University, Tisch School of the Arts, where she got her BFA in drama. Since her graduation Paula has been working in film, television and theatre in Buenos Aires.

== Career ==
In 2009 Paula played Luna Vork in Casi Angeles. TELEFE. Produced by Cris Morena Group and RGB.

In 2010 Paula played one of the lead roles in Argentine Film Manuel Belgrano (film). Produced by Juan Jose Campanella, Academy Award Winner for Best Foreign Film The Secret in Their Eyes, and directed by Sebastian Pivotto. Paula starred next to Argentine actors Pablo Rago, Valeria Bertucelli and Pablo Echarri.

In 2011 Paula was in The Sound of Music playing Louisa Von Trapp at the Teatro Opera in Buenos Aires. Directed by Jonathan Butterell. Lighting design by Rick Fisher.

In 2012 Paula played Sophie in Mamma Mia! Also at the Teatro Opera in Buenos Aires. Directed by Robert McQueen. Paula won the ACE Award for Outstanding Performance in Theatre for this role.

In 2012 Paula played Florencia Alvarez in German, Ultimas Vinetas starring next to Miguel Angel Sola. Television Publica. Directed by Cristian Bernard, Flavio Nardini and Federico Sosa. Paula was nominated for Best Actress in Nuevas Miradas de TV Awards.

In 2013 and 2014 Played Mary in TV Series Aliados. Telefe. Cris Morena

In 2017 starred in Film Veredas directed by Fernando Cricenti and Produced by NOPROBLEM CINE.

In 2017 starred in Feature Film Todavia, written and directed by Tomas Sanchez.

In 2018 starred in Tampoco Tan Grandes. Directed by Federico Sosa. Film Paula wrote and produced with Maximo Reca.

In 2019 starred in Delfin by Gaspar Scheuer Produced by Tarea Fina.

== TV ==
Year	Show	Channel	Role
2009	Casi Angeles	Telefe	Luna Vork
2013	Aliados	Telefe	Mary
2013	German, Ultimas Vinetas	Canal 7	Florencia Alvarez
2014	Aliados	Telefe	Mary

== Film ==
Year	Film	Role
2005	Bajarlia	Ana
2008	Tom's Phone	Joanna
2010	Belgrano	María Dolores Helguero
2017	Veredas	Lucia
2018	Todavia	Sol
2019	Tampoco Tan Grandes	Lola
2019	Delfin	Fanny

== Theatre ==
Year	Show	Role
2005	Radiant Baby	Maurice
2006	Sound of Plaid	Gladys
2009	Casi ángeles	Luna Vörg
2011	The Sound of Music	Louisa
2012	Mamma Mia!	Sophie
2019	ONCE	Girl

== Awards ==
Year	Award	Category	Work	Result
2019	HUGO Theatre Award	Best Leading Actress in Theatre	ONCE	Won
2012	ACE Theatre Award	Outstanding Performance in Theatre	Mamma Mia!	Won
2014	Nuevas Miradas TV Series Awards	Best Actress	German, Ultimas Vinetas	Nominated
