= Julián Serrano =

Argentine YouTuber, actor, singer and television presenter

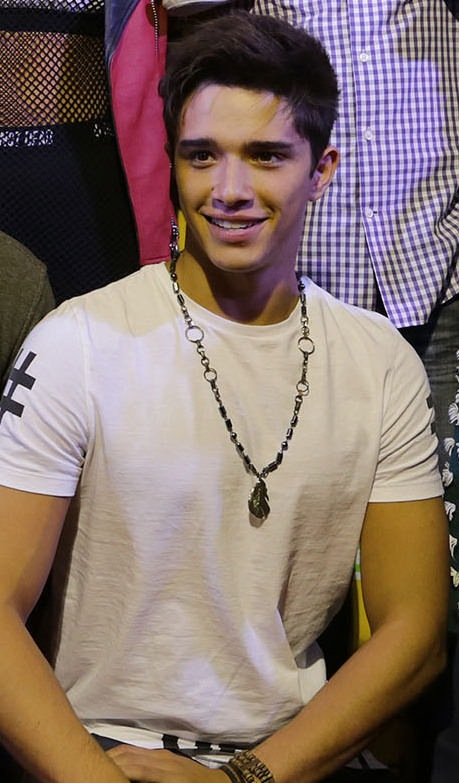
- Serrano in 2014
- Born: Julián Ezequiel Serrano; October 16, 1993 (age 32); Paraná, Argentina
- Occupations: Actor; singer; television presenter

Julián Ezequiel Serrano (born 16 October 1993) is an Argentine YouTuber, actor, singer and television presenter.

== Biography ==
Julián Ezequiel Serrano was born on October 16, 1993, in Paraná. He is the oldest son of Óscar Alfredo Serrano Badioli and Diana Gabriela Itria, and has younger sister named Yolanda Serrano.

== YouTube channel ==
In 2009, he created a channel called Yotmbestoyalpdo (which means: "Yo tampoco tengo nada que hacer" in Argentine Spanish) with covers and humor videos. In 2011, Serrano started with the channel JulianSerrano7 that would give him recognition not only in his country but also throughout Latin America and Spain. In 2013, he began his acting career in a series called Aliados, created by Cris Morena.

== Career ==
=== Television career ===
Julián Serrano abandoned his studies of psychology to move to Buenos Aires and begin his acting career in Aliados. In that series he has played Franco Alfaro, a marginal teenager, without work or study, who earns his living with dubious acts.

=== Singing career ===
In 2015, Serrano began his career as a solo singer under the stage name Jota Esse, the initial letters of his name in Spanish language. That same year he began a national tour across the country. His first album is available on iTunes and Spotify. On 13 March 2020, Julián Serrano announced via Twitter and Instagram that he signed a contract with Warner Music Group.

== Filmography ==
=== Television ===
==== Series ====
Year	Title	Character	Channel
2012-2015	Presentes	Luca Prieto	Encuentro
2013-2014	Aliados	Franco Alfaro	Telefe
2017	Quiero vivir a tu lado	Pedro Romano Petrucci	Canal 13
2017-2018	Golpe al corazón	Alejo Ferrari	Telefe
2019	El host		Fox

==== TV Program ====
Year	Title	Notes	Channel
2018	Bailando 2018	Participates with Sofia Morandi «Winners»	eltrece
2018	S.T.O. #LaPrevia	Host (with Sofia Morandi)	América TV
2021	Match Game		eltrece

=== Movies ===
Year	Movie	Character	Director
2018	Perdida	Ariel	Alejandro Montiel

== Discography ==
- 2013 — Esta es mi Historia
- 2014 — Eres
- 2014 — Love is Louder ft. Oriana Sabatini
- 2014 — Ella baila enamorada
- 2015 — Yo te Protejo
- 2015 — Fenómeno de Redes
- 2015 — Hasta Mañana
- 2015 — Mirame
- 2015 — Dime por favor
- 2016 — Fatal
- 2016 — Vida Tranquila
- 2018 — Confesión
- 2018 — Dicen Que ft. MYA
- 2018 — Y si te Atreves
- 2019 — Gracias
- 2020 — María
- 2020 — Dos Desconocidos ft. PEMA
- 2020 — Un Trago Más
- 2020 — Quedarme Contigo
- 2020 — Seguiré conmigo
- 2020 — Hoy

== Awards and nominations ==
Year	Country	Awards	Category	Work	Result	Ref.
2015	(Mexico)	MTV Millennial Awards	Instagramer argentino del año	Herself (Instagram)	Nominated	
