= Belgrano (film) =

- Poster
- Written by: Marcelo Camano; Juan Pablo Domenech
- Directed by: Sebastián Pivotto
- Starring: Pablo Rago; Pablo Echarri; Valeria Bertuccelli; Paula Reca
- Country of origin: Argentina
- Original language: Spanish

Production
- Producers: Marina Bacin; Gustavo Villamagna; Juan José Campanella
- Running time: 90 minutes
- Budget: $4.5 million

Original release
- Release: 27 November 2010

Belgrano is a 2010 Argentine adventure drama TV film, based on the life of the Argentine national hero Manuel Belgrano. It is being produced in the context of the Argentina Bicentennial, which raised the public interest in the May Revolution and the Argentine War of Independence. Pablo Rago, one of the actors of the aforementioned movie, had the lead role as Belgrano. He left the TV series Botineras before its ending, in order to take part in this movie.

The first scenes of the film were filmed in Quilmes, playing scene at Posta de Yatasto where Manuel Belgrano hands the command of the Army of the North to José de San Martín, played by Pablo Echarri. The film is scheduled to be filmed both at Buenos Aires and Tucuman.

Valeria Bertucelli played María Josefa Ezcurra, Belgrano's lover. Sebastián Pivoto declared that he intended to provide a more humane, less idealized, interpretation of the life of Belgrano. Film producer Guillermo Pfening played the role of Dr. Terranova.

The film premiered on November 27, 2010, at a public event at the National Flag Memorial in Rosario.
