= Los que aman, odian =

- Directed by: Alejandro Maci
- Written by: Alejandro Maci; Esther Feldman
- Produced by: Juan Vera; Juan Pablo Galli; Christian Faillace
- Starring: Guillermo Francella; Luisana Lopilato
- Music by: Nicolás Sorín
- Release date: September 7, 2017
- Running time: 101 minutes
- Box office: $1,764,833

Los que aman, odian is an Argentine thriller and police film of 2017 directed by Alejandro Maci and based on the novel by Bioy Casares and Silvina Ocampo. It stars Guillermo Francella and Luisana Lopilato in lead roles, and was filmed in Pinamar, Argentina.

== Plot ==
On a lonely beach, stands an old hotel lost in time. Enrique Hubermann (Guillermo Francella), a homeopathic doctor, travels fleeing from a love. By a chance of fate, in that distant place he meets Mary Fraga (Luisana Lopilato) the woman who he wants to forget, a beautiful young woman like a demon who manipulates men and causes dangerous passions. In the midst of a terrible storm that isolates them from the world, history repeats itself again. But on this occasion, the hatred of those who had loved too much awakens the worst of each.

== Cast ==
- Guillermo Francella as Dr. Enrique Hubermann
- Luisana Lopilato as Mary Fraga
- Justina Bustos as Emilia Fraga
- Juan Minujín as Atuel
- Marilú Marini as Andrea, the hotel owner
- Carlos Portaluppi as Commissar
- Mario Alarcón
- Gonzalo Urtizberea

== Release ==
The film premiered in Argentine cinemas with approximately 240 screens according to the distributor Buena Vista. In addition, some of the copies will have Spanish subtitles, a new trend in the industry to facilitate access to films for people with hearing problems.
