= Perdida (2018 film) =

Crime thriller drama film by Alejandro Montiel

- Directed by: Alejandro Montiel
- Written by: Alejandro Montiel; Jorge Maestro; Mili Roque Pitt
- Based on: Cornelia by Florencia Etcheves
- Produced by: Axel Kuschevatzky; Matías Levinson
- Starring: Luisana Lopilato; Amaia Salamanca; Nicolás Furtado; Oriana Sabatini; Julián Serrano; Laura Laprida; Benjamín Otero; Sol Wainer
- Cinematography: Guillermo Nieto
- Edited by: Fran Amaro
- Music by: Alfonso G. Aguilar
- Production companies: Bowfinger International Pictures; Cornelia la Película; INCAA; MyS Producción; Telefé; Tondero Producciones
- Release date: April 19, 2018
- Running time: 103 minutes
- Countries: Argentina; Spain; Peru
- Language: Spanish

Perdida is a 2018 internationally co-produced crime thriller drama film directed by Alejandro Montiel. It is based on Argentinian journalist Florencia Etcheves’s novel Cornelia.

== Plot ==
Fourteen years ago, during a study trip, a teenage girl, Cornelia Villalba (Amaia Salamanca) ran away with her companions to go dancing and got lost in the middle of the Patagonian forests, and she is never heard from again. At present, Manuela Pelari (Luisana Lopilato) her best friend, decides to use her police tools to undertake a new search. Driven by disrespect and a compelling need to end years of silence and broken ties, she is faced with a power that threatens to turn her into one more piece of a cog that could cost her her life. A commissioner who acts as a father, a ruthless murderer and a Spanish woman as beautiful as it is dangerous, a girl raised outside the law and a colleague who tries to indoctrinate a Pipa mistress of disobedience, are the characters that surround a search that does not give respite.

== Cast ==
- Luisana Lopilato as Manuela "Pipa" Pelari
- Amaia Salamanca as Cornelia Villalba/Nadine Basset/Sirena
- Nicolás Furtado as Martín Seretti
- Oriana Sabatini as Alina Zambrano
- Julián Serrano as Young Ariel
- Rafael Spregelburd as Oreyana
- Mara Alberto as Clara Villalba
- Sara Sálamo as Dr. Claudia Marini
- Laura Laprida as Leonora
- Arancha Martí as Lucrecia
- Marina Garré as Micaela
- Benjamín Otero as Rodrigo
- Carlos Alcántara Vilar as Adalberto
- Juan Ignacio Cane as Ariel
- Mora Magnarelli as Young Cornelia
- Micaela Kastan as Young Leonora
- Sol Wainer as Young Mariana
- Pedro Casablanc as Egipcio
- Carlos del Río as Sacristan
- Angelina Napoli
- Nicolás Torres
- Ramón Oreyana

== Production ==
The director Alejandro Montiel after working as creative director, he together with Mili Roque Pitt looked for a film to direct in a different genre that is not comedy, as Montiel likes the police, he read the book and decided to adapt it for a movie.

== Casting ==
Luisana Lopilato for the role had to practice martial arts and learn to use a revolver with the help of a policeman. The film was the cinematographic debut of Oriana Sabatini and Julián Serrano.

== Shooting ==
The film began on October 2, 2017 in natural settings in Argentina and Spain.

== Reception ==
On Rotten Tomatoes, the film has an aggregate score of 20% based on 1 positive and 4 negative critic reviews.
