= The Heist of the Century (film) =

2020 film directed by Ariel Winograd

- Theatrical release poster
- Spanish: El robo del siglo
- Directed by: Ariel Winograd
- Written by: Alex Zito; Fernando Araujo
- Story by: Juan Manuel Zalloechevarria
- Starring: Diego Peretti; Guillermo Francella; Pablo Rago; Luis Luque; Rafael Ferro; Mariano Argento
- Cinematography: Félix Monti
- Edited by: Pablo Barbieri Carrera
- Music by: Dario Eskenazi
- Production companies: AZ Films; MarVista Entertainment; Telefe; VFX Boat
- Distributed by: Warner Bros. Pictures
- Release date: 16 January 2020
- Running time: 114 minutes
- Country: Argentina
- Language: Spanish
- Box office: $12 million

The Heist of the Century (Spanish: El robo del siglo) is a 2020 Argentine comedy thriller film and is directed by Ariel Winograd. The film stars Diego Peretti, Guillermo Francella, Pablo Rago, Luis Luque, Rafael Ferro, and Mariano Argento.

== Plot ==
The film is based on a true story, the Bank Río Heist of the Banco Río branch in the Buenos Aires town of Acassuso on January 13, 2006, which was held up by a gang of six robbers armed with replica weapons. They took 23 hostages and took $15 million from 147 safes.

== Cast ==
- Diego Peretti as Fernando Araujo, mastermind and executor of the heist.
- Guillermo Francella as Mario Vitette Sellanes, "the man in the gray suit."
- Pablo Rago as Sebastián as "the Martian."
- Luis Luque as Miguel Sileo, a police negotiator.
- Juan Alari as "the Paisa", driver of the truck.
- Rafael Ferro as Alberto "Beto" de la Torre, in charge of taking hostages.
- Magela Zanotta as "the Turk," De la Torre's wife.
- Johanna Francella as Lucía Vitette Sellanes.
- Mariano Argento as "the Doc" Debauza.
- Mario Moscoso and Darío Levy as police officers.
- Fabián Arenillas as the head of the Hawk Group.
- Mario Alarcón as the prosecutor.
- Enrique Dumont as the psychoanalyst.
- Sebastián Mogordoy as the security guard.
- Mariela Pizzo as Claudia, wife of "the Martian"
- Luz Palazón as the bank employee.
- María Marull as the lawyer.
- Paula Grinszpan as the cleaning worker.
- Pochi Ducasse and Juan Tupac Soler as hostages.

== Production ==
The filming began on April 15, 2019, in Buenos Aires and ended on June 4 of the same year in Potrerillos, Mendoza, approximately seven and a half months before its final release, on January 16, 2020. The script was written by producer Alex Zito and the author of the robbery, Fernando Araujo, who had a paint shop ten blocks from the bank. The film was distributed by Warner Bros. Pictures.

== Release ==
The Heist of the Century premiered in Argentina on 16 January 2020. It also showed at the Málaga Film Festival in March 2020.

== Reception ==
=== Critical response ===
The film received positive reviews from the specialized press.

On the review aggregator website Rotten Tomatoes, 83% of 6 critics' reviews are positive, with an average rating of 6.7/10.

According to the website Todas las críticas, a portal that collects and averages among various professional reviews, the film has a rating of 77/100, based on 34 reviews.

=== Box office ===
The film, distributed by Warner Bros., was released in 376 theaters, which involved a nationwide release. Given the interest during its premiere and previews, it ended up expanding its premiere to 392 theaters. With an estimate of 96,420 tickets sold on Thursday, January 17, 2020, according to the website, Ultracine, Heist of the Century thus became the second most viewed Argentine film in history on its opening day, only behind what was achieved by the animated film Underdogs, with 113,000 entries. After its first weekend on the billboard, the film also managed to be in fifth place in history in terms of tickets sold by a native production with 417,000 tickets cut off, only surpassed by The Clan (504,000), Wild Tales (450,000) and Underdogs (425,000). At the end of its first full week on the billboard, the total reached 634,000.

The film was seen by two million viewers.
