= Mariana Briski =

Argentine actress

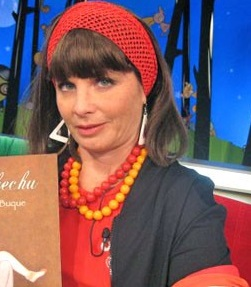
- Briski in 2009
- Born: Mariana Marcela Briski; 14 September 1965; Córdoba, Argentina
- Died: 14 August 2014 (aged 48); Buenos Aires, Argentina
- Occupations: Actress, director, producer, screenwriter, author, professor
- Years active: 1985–2012

Mariana Marcela Briski (14 September 1965 – 14 August 2014) was an Argentine actress, director, producer, screenwriter, author, and professor. She was known for her roles in It's Not You, It's Me (2004), The Wind (2005), and Salsipuedes (2011). Briski was also known for her television roles in Primicias and Poné a Francella.

Briski was born in Córdoba, Argentina. She was married to Hernán Ventura from 1988 until her death in 2014; the couple had one son, Pedro.

In October 2004, Briski was diagnosed with breast cancer. By 2012, it had metastasised into her lungs. In 2014, Briski died from lung and breast cancer in Buenos Aires, Argentina, aged 48.

== Cancer ==
In October 2004, following a routine mammogram, she was diagnosed with breast cancer. She had a history of breast cancer in her family: her grandmother suffered and healed but died many years later of natural causes. Mariana Briski had to endure two surgeries, chemotherapy and radiotherapy.

―How do you tell your child that you were sick?
―I told him the truth. I think that when you know what is happening, you can deal with the pain in a better way. I sat Pedro down and told him, using words for a child his age, that I had something in my breast and that they had to take it out. He immediately asked me if the same thing was going to happen to him. I told him no and I also explained to him about the hair. Luckily there was a doll at home that you could take the hair out and put it back in and that helped.
―Did you ask for professional help to talk to him?
―Sure, I had professionals who helped me in all areas of my life for the couple, family, everything. I think Pedro took it pretty well. What's more, he's going to an art workshop and recently gave me a sculpture that was me, hat and all. He said, "So you won't forget that you wear a hat". [Mariana Briski is visibly excited for the first time].

— Interview with Mariana Briski

In early 2011 she was diagnosed with metastases pulmonary large. In April 2011 she went to Dr. Crescenti to help chemotherapy to which she was subjected.

=== Death ===
Mariana Briski died at the age 48 on Thursday, August 14, 2014 at 3:30 pm after a long struggle with breast cancer. She spent a week hospitalized in the Alexander Fleming Institute in the neighborhood of Colegiales/Belgrano where her condition aggravated and ended with the death of the famous actress. She was buried in the Jardín de Paz of Pilar on Friday, August 15 at 1 pm.

== Filmography ==
Schauspielerin

- 1985: Tage im Juni (Los días de junio)
- 1992: De la cabeza (TV-Serie, 19 episodes)
- 1993: Cha cha cha (TV-Serie, 22 episodes)
- 1997: Mob-Cops – Unerbittlich, unbestechlich (Comodines)
- 1998: Los Rodríguez (TV-Serie, 11 episodes)
- 2000: Primicias (TV-Serie, 37 episodes)
- 2000: Chabonas (TV-Serie, 3 episodes)
- 2001: Poné a Francella (TV-Serie, 39 episodes)
- 2002: ¿Sabés nadar?
- 2003: Resistiré (TV-Serie, 3 episodes)
- 2004: El favor
- 2004: No sos vos, soy yo
- 2004: Los secretos de papá (TV-Serie, 151 episodes)
- 2005: El viento
- 2006: Chiquititas sin fin (TV-Serie, 68 episodes)
- 2008: Motivos para no enamorarse
- 2011: El dedo
- 2011: Salsipuedes
