= Aliados =

Argentine television series from 2013-2014

- Genre: Teen drama Comedy drama Fantasy; Romance
- Created by: Cris Morena
- Written by: Leandro Calderone
- Directed by: Carlos Luna; Diego Sánchez; Estela Cristiani
- Starring: Peter Lanzani; Pablo Martínez; Oriana Sabatini; Julián Serrano; Mariel Percossi; Agustín Bernasconi; Joaquín Ochoa; Nicolás Francella; Jenny Martínez; Máximo Espíndola; Lola Morán; Carolina Domenech
- Opening theme: "Aliados" by Juan Pedro Lanzani
- Country of origin: Argentina
- Original language: Spanish
- No. of seasons: 2
- No. of episodes: 40 (list of episodes)

Production
- Executive producer: Laura Fernández
- Producer: Martín Pennacino
- Production location: Buenos Aires
- Running time: 45 minutes
- Production company: Cris Morena Group

Original release
- Network: Telefe
- Release: June 26, 2013 – August 3, 2014

Related
- Chiquititas; Rebelde Way; Rincón de Luz; Floricienta; Casi Ángeles

Aliados (English: Allies) is an Argentine television series created and produced by Cris Morena aired by the network Telefe in Argentina and by the FOX Network to the rest of Latin America. It's aimed at teen and youth audiences. The premiere, which was planned for June 10, 2013, was delayed to June 26, 2013. This show marks the return of producer Cris Morena to television after two years, when her production company closed at the end the telenovela Casi Ángeles, because of the death of her daughter Romina Yan. The series airs in 18 countries, including Israel and some in Europe. The season 1 is composed of 23 episodes for television and 126 webisodes online which are parts from the television episodes.

The series covers social problems such as promiscuity, unwanted pregnancies, bullying, suicide, anorexia, juvenile delinquency, child labour, alcoholism and family violence, among others.

== Plot ==
=== Season 1 ===
From its origin, the human race has traveled the planet constructing it and destroying it with the same intensity. In the last decades, humans have achieved great advances in science and technology in a very accelerated way. Because of these advances, people have distanced themselves from others to the point that they forgot those who are and are on Earth. In the wake of this oblivion, at the end of 2012, humanity began a 105-day countdown that will lead to either its destruction or revival.

The series follows six young humans: Noah (Juan Pedro Lanzani), Azul (Oriana Sabatini), Maia (Mariel Percossi), Manuel (Agustín Bernasconi), Franco (Julian Serrano) and Valentín (Joaquín Ochoa). A plot summary describes them as "as powerful as they are weak, as attractive as they are lost, as revolutionary as they are violent and as isolated as they are connected". With the help of The Feminine Energy Creator (Dolores Fonzi), they are assisted by seven beings of light: Ian (Pablo Martinez), Venecia (Jenny Martinez), Inti (Nicholas Francella), Ámbar (Lola Morán), Luz (Oriana Sabatini), Devi (Carolina Domenech) and Gopal (Maximo Espindola). They come from various parts of the universe to become the Allies of the humans and help them save the "human project". After 105 days, they face a new enemy.

=== Season 2 ===
The second season premiers on Sunday, April 6, 2014 on Telefe. This season will be focused on the war between the Light Beings (Angels) and their human allies against the Morks (Demons) until it ended on Sunday, August 3, 2014.

== Cast and characters ==
=== Main characters ===
- Peter Lanzani as Noah García Iturbe
- Pablo Martínez as Ian King/Joaquín Gaitán
- Oriana Sabatini as Azul Medina/Luz
- Julián Serrano as Franco Alfaro
- Mariel Percossi as Maia Pinedo
- Agustín Bernasconi as Manuel Ramírez
- Joaquín Ochoa as Valentín Gaitan
- Nicolás Francella as Matías Arce/Inti
- Jenny Martinez as Venecia
- Lola Morán as Ámbar
- Carolina Domenech as Devi
- Maximo Espíndola as Gopal

=== Supporting characters ===
- Juan Leyrado as Energía Creadora Masculina
- Dolores Fonzi as Energía Creadora Femenina
- Paula Reca as Mary
- Michel Noher as Taylor
- Ingrid García-Jonsson as Bianca Rock
- Valentina Zenere as Mara Ulloa
- Ana Celentano as Elena García Iturbe
- Iván Espeche as Mariano Arce
- Boy Olmi as Justo García Iturbe
- Alejandro Botto as Fermín García Iturbe
- Joaquín Méndez as Milo García Iturbe
- Tomás Fidalgo as Tomás García Iturbe
- Marcelo Serre as Jorge Luis Ramírez
- Noemí Frenkel as Josefina de Ramírez
- Eugenia Guerty as Natalia Pinedo
- Mercedes Funes as Matilda Sánchez
- Federico Lama as Paul Vega
- Diego Mariani as Félix Ulloa
- Patrizia Camponovo as Lara de Arce
- Lucila Viggiano as Gala Noboa
- Edgardo Castro as Luis Alfaro
- Manuela Viale as Emma
- Verónica Pelaccini as Ada
- Eliseo Rentería as Daimon
- Roly Serrano as Morales
- Esteban Maggio as Federico
- Agustina Micaela Delun as Camila

== Episodes ==
Season	Episodes	Argentina		Latin America	
Season	Episodes	Start	End	Start	End
1	23	June 26, 2013	November 27, 2013	June 27, 2013	November 28, 2013
2	17	April 6, 2014	August 3, 2014	April 7, 2014	2014

== Media ==
=== Music ===
Aliados

Soundtrack album by Aliados
- Released: June 11, 2013
- Recorded: 2013
- Genres: Latin pop, pop, teen pop
- Length: 56:33
- Label: Sony Music Entertainment Argentina

The Aliados soundtrack was released on June 11, 2013 and was certified gold record two weeks after its release. The 15 songs on the album are performed by much of the cast and was written by Cris Morena. On October 1, 2013 the CD was certified platinum in Argentina.

No.	Title	Length
1.	"Aliados" (Peter Lanzani)	3:48
2.	"Amor Mío" (Oriana Sabatini)	3:36
3.	"Ahora o Nunca" (Oriana Sabatini)	3:36
4.	"Vuelvo" (Maxi Espíndola and Agustín Bernasconi)	4:19
5.	"Ya No Hay Fuego" (Oriana Sabatini)	3:59
6.	"Tanto Amarte" (Oriana Sabatini)	3:43
7.	"Carpe Diem" (Maxi Espíndola and Agustín Bernasconi)	3:59
8.	"Ser Hoy" (Maxi Espíndola)	3:33
9.	"Levántate y Anda" (Oriana Sabatini and Jenny Martínez)	3:25
10.	"Refundación" (Cast of Aliados)	3:50
11.	"Quién Eres Tú" (Peter Lanzani and Jenny Martínez)	4:23
12.	"Vas a Gritar" (Nico Francella, Maxi Espindola, Agustín Bernasconi and Eliseo Rentería)	3:52
13.	"Yo Soy" (Jenny Martínez)	3:40
14.	"Un Pacto" (Maxi Espindola)	4:07
15.	"Me Duele Todo" (Mariel Percossi)	3:02
16.	"El Amor es Posible" (Agustina Micala Delun and Oriana Sabatini)	3:09
Total length:		56:33

=== Applications ===
Aliados has released two applications - Aliados Interactivo (for Apple and Android) and Aliados Misiones (for Android).

- Aliados Interactivo features trivia, character information, videos and more.
- Aliados Misiones is a game where you must solve quests traveling the world of Light Beings. It's similar to Candy Crush.

== Trivia ==
- Peter Lanzani (Noah), Pablo Martínez (Ian/Joaquín), Paula Reca (Mary) and Mercedes Funes (Matilda), they all had previously worked together, in the same project by Cris Morena : Casi Ángeles.

== Awards and nominations ==
Date	Award	Category	Nominee	Result
October 18, 2013	Kids' Choice Awards Argentina	Favorite TV show		Nominated
October 18, 2013	Kids' Choice Awards Argentina	Favorite TV actor	Peter Lanzani	Won
October 18, 2013	Kids' Choice Awards Argentina	Favorite Villain	Mariel Percossi	Nominated
October 18, 2013	Kids' Choice Awards Argentina	Revelación	Nicolás Francella	Nominated
October 18, 2013	Kids' Choice Awards Argentina	Revelación	Oriana Sabatini	Won
2013	Premios Tato			
2013	Premios Tato	Ficción Unitario	Aliados	Nominated
2013	Premios Tato	Revelación	Nicolás Francella	Nominated
2013	Premios Tato	Dirección de fotografía en ficción		Nominated
2013	Premios Tato	Edición en ficción		Nominated
2013	Premios Tato	Casting en ficción		Nominated
2013	Premios Tato	Vestuario en ficción		Nominated
2013	Premios Tato	Dirección de arte en ficción		Nominated

=== Nominations ===
- 2013 Martín Fierro Awards
  - Best program for kids
  - Best new actor or actress (Nicolás Francella)
  - Best opening theme

== Broadcasting ==
Country	Alternate title / Translation	Network(s)	First aired	Last aired	Weekly time	Hour
Argentina	Aliados	Telefe (original)	June 26, 2013	November 27, 2013	Wednesdays	21:15
Uruguay	Aliados	Monte Carlo TV	June 26, 2013	TBA	Thursdays	23:00
International	Aliados	FOX	June 27, 2013	TBA	Thursdays	19:00
Portugal	Aliados	SIC	November 10, 2013	TBA	Sundays	11:00
Philippines	Aliados	GMA	May 1, 2017	June 2, 2017	Mondays to Fridays	9:45
