= At Night We Walk in Circles =

2013 novel by Daniel Alarcón

- First edition
- Author: Daniel Alarcón
- Language: English
- Genre: Novel
- Publisher: Riverhead Books
- Publication date: October 31, 2013
- Publication place: United States
- Media type: Print (hardcover)
- Pages: 384 pp
- ISBN: 978-1-59463-171-9

At Night We Walk in Circles is a 2013 novel written by Daniel Alarcón.

== Plot summary ==
A young actor, Nelson, living in a nameless Latin American country joins Diciembre, a guerrilla theatre troupe. They plan to perform in a politically controversial play titled The Idiot President. The play's author, Henry Nuñez, was previously jailed for the original production. Nelson immerses himself in the world of the play, performing in taverns and city squares, until the tour brings the trio to the hometown of Rogelio, Henry’s former cellmate and confidant. Henry’s past and Nelson’s future converge, setting the stage for a fast-unraveling mystery of role-playing and retribution.
