= Iguazu Falls =

Waterfalls on the Iguazú River on the border of Argentina and Brazil

Iguazú Falls
- Chororõ Yguasu (Guarani); Cataratas del Iguazú (Spanish); Cataratas do Iguaçu (Portuguese); Y Ûasu (Tupinambá)
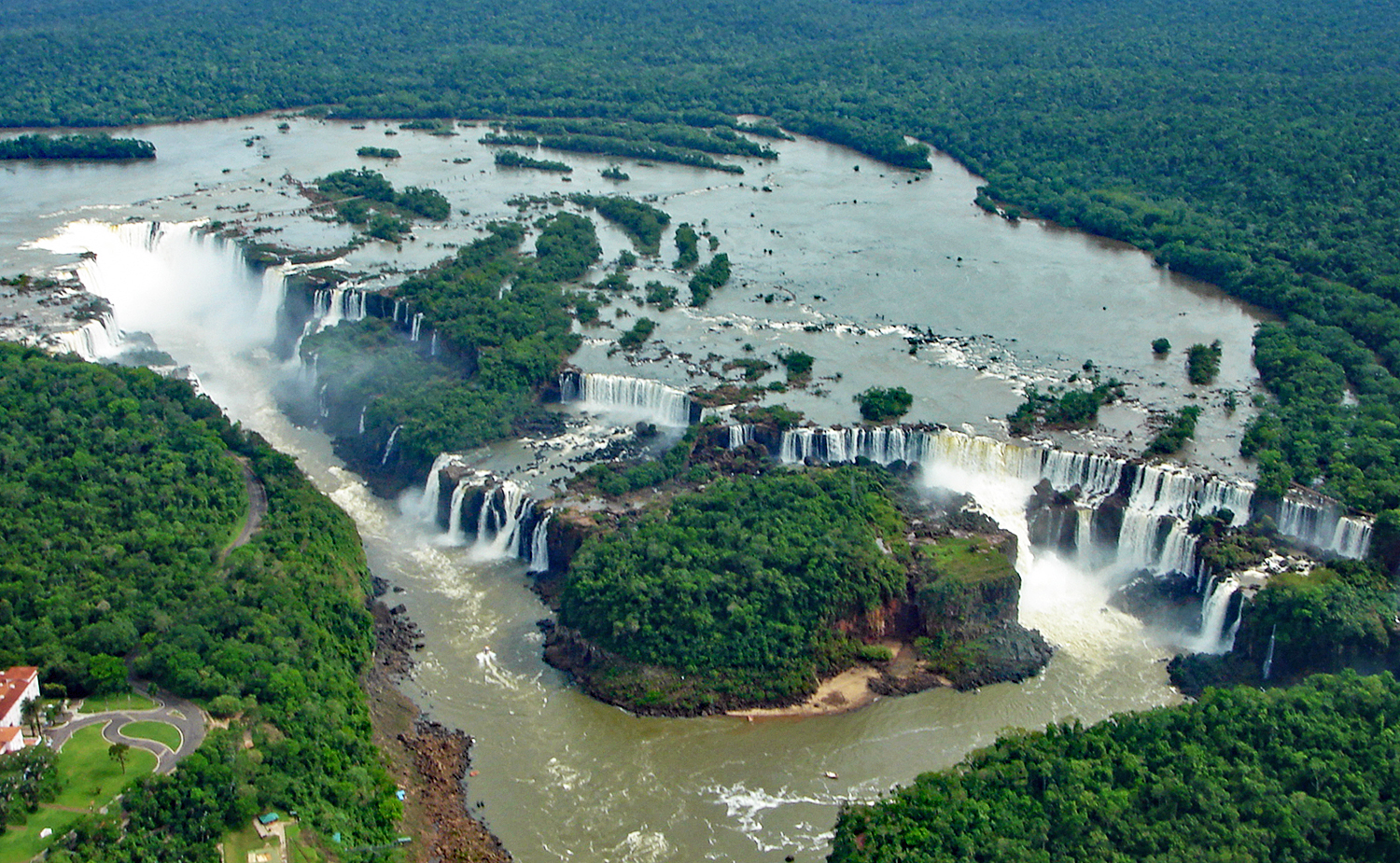

- Location within South America Location within Argentina Location within Brazil
- Location: Argentina, Misiones; Brazil, Paraná
- Coordinates: 25°41′12″S 54°26′41″W
- Number of drops: 275
- Longest drop: 82 metres (269 ft)
- Watercourse: Iguazu River
- Average flow rate: 1,756 m^{3}/s (62,010 cu ft/s)

The Iguazú Falls or Iguaçu Falls (Note: Guarani: Chororõ Yguasu [ɕoɾoˈɾõ ɨɣʷaˈsu], y guasu meaning 'big water'; Spanish: Cataratas del Iguazú [kataˈɾatas ðel iɣwaˈsu]; Portuguese: Cataratas do Iguaçu [kataˈɾatɐz du iɡwaˈsu]; Tupinambá: Y Ûasu, lit. 'big water') are waterfalls of the Iguazu River on the border of the Argentine province of Misiones and the Brazilian state of Paraná. Together, they make up the largest waterfall system in the world. The falls divide the river into the upper and lower Iguazu. The Iguazu River rises near the heart of the city of Curitiba. For most of its course, the river flows through Brazil; however, most of the falls are on the Argentine side. Below its confluence with the San Antonio River, the Iguazu River forms the border between Argentina and Brazil.

The name Iguazú comes from the Guarani or Tupi words y [ɨ], meaning 'water', and ûasú [waˈsu], meaning 'big'. Legend has it that a deity planned to marry a beautiful woman named Naipí, who fled with her mortal lover Tarobá in a canoe. In a rage, the deity sliced the river, creating the waterfalls and condemning the lovers to an eternal fall. The first European to record the existence of the falls was the Spanish Conquistador Álvar Núñez Cabeza de Vaca in 1541. The falls are protected within Iguazú National Park in Argentina and Iguaçu National Park in Brazil, inscribed on the UNESCO World Heritage List in 1984 and 1986 respectively.

== Geology and geography ==
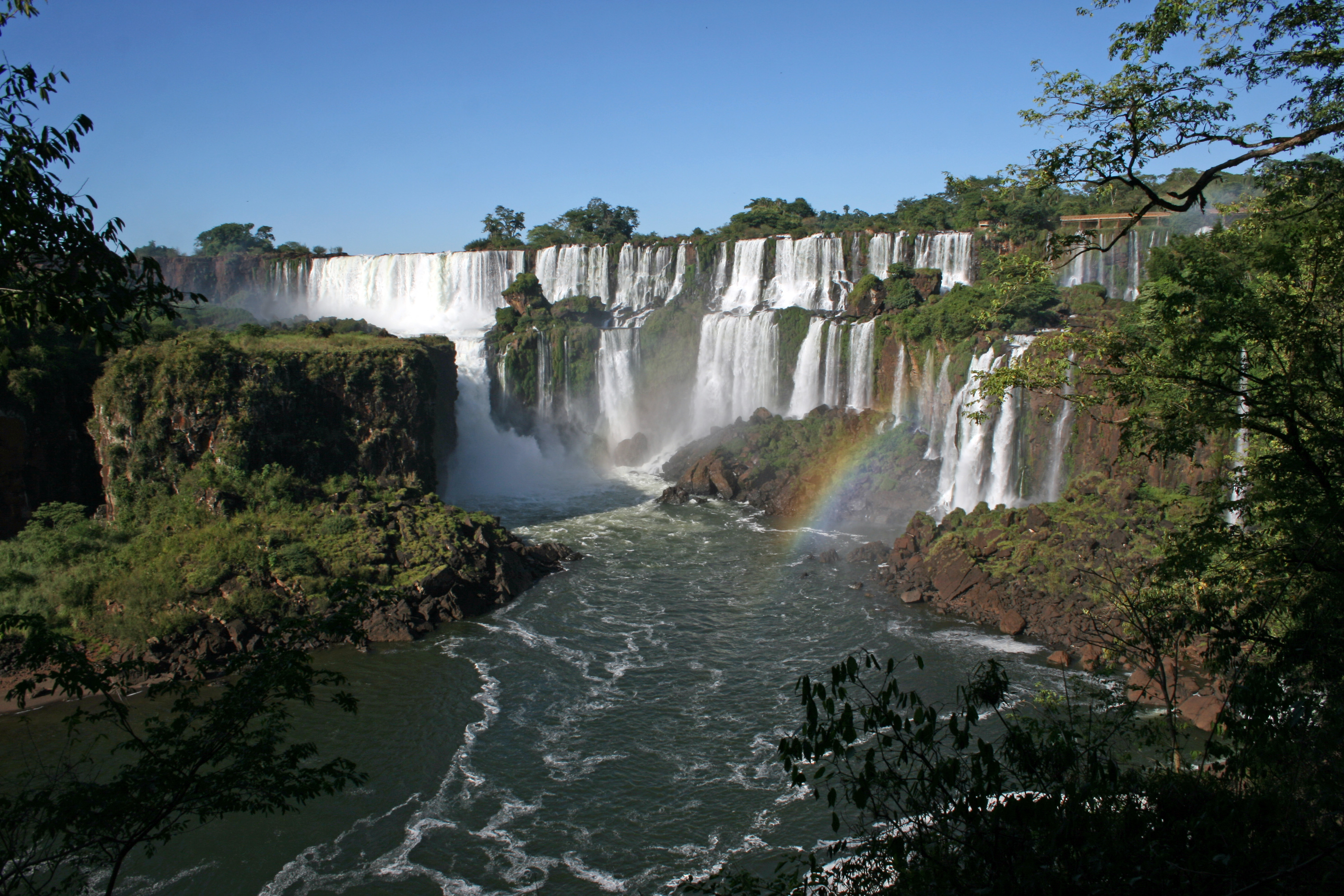
The falls on the Argentine side in the Iguazú National Park.

The staircase character of the falls consists of a two-step waterfall formed by three layers of basalt. The steps are 35 and 40 metres (115 and 131 ft) in height. The columnar basalt rock sequences are part of the 1,000-metre-thick (3,300 ft) Serra Geral formation within the Paleozoic-Mesozoic Paraná Basin. The tops of these sequences are characterized by 8–10 m (26–33 ft) of highly resistant vesicular basalt and the contact between these layers controls the shape of the falls. Headwater erosion rates are estimated at 1.4–2.1 cm/year (0.55–0.83 in/year). Numerous islands along the 2.7-kilometre-long (1.7 mi) edge divide the falls into many separate waterfalls and cataracts, varying between 60 and 82 m (197 and 269 ft) high. The number of these smaller waterfalls fluctuates from 150 to 300, depending on the water level. About half of the river's flow falls into a long and narrow chasm called the Devil's Throat (Garganta del Diablo in Spanish or Garganta do Diabo in Portuguese).

The Devil's Throat canyon is 80–90 m (260–300 ft) wide and 70–80 m (230–260 ft) deep. Left of this canyon, another part of the river forms 160–200 individual falls, which merge into a single front during the flood stage. The largest falls are named San Martín, Adam and Eva, Penoni, and Bergano.

About 900 m (2,950 ft) of the 2.7 km (1.7 mi) length does not have water flowing over it. The water of the lower Iguazu collects in a canyon that drains into the Paraná River, a short distance downstream from the Itaipu Dam. The junction of the water flows marks the border between Brazil, Argentina, and Paraguay. Some points in the cities of Foz do Iguaçu, Brazil, Puerto Iguazú, Argentina, and Ciudad del Este, Paraguay, have access to the Iguazu River, where the borders of all three nations may be seen, a popular tourist attraction for visitors to the three cities.

The layout of Iguazu Falls resembles a reversed letter "J". The Argentina–Brazil border runs through the Devil's Throat. On the right bank is the Brazilian territory, which is home to more than 95% of the Iguazu River basin but has just over 20% of the jumps of these falls, and the left side jumps are Argentine, which make up almost 80% of the falls.

== Access ==
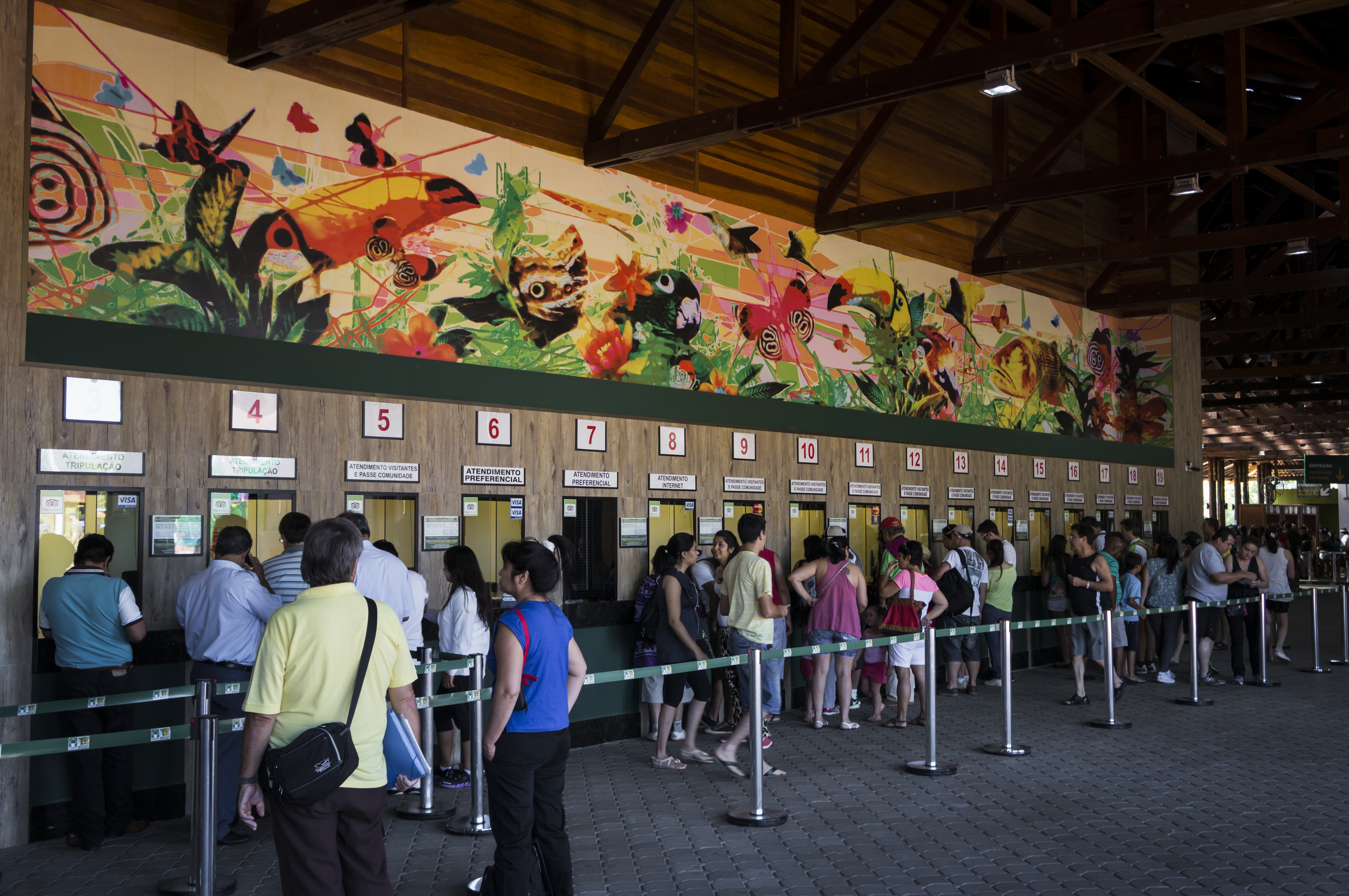
Ticket office – Iguaçu National Park, Brazil

The falls may be reached from two main towns, with one on either side of the falls: Foz do Iguaçu in Brazil and Puerto Iguazú in Argentina, as well as from Ciudad del Este, Paraguay, on the other side of the Paraná River from Foz do Iguaçu, each of those three cities having commercial airports. The falls are shared by the Iguazú National Park (Argentina) and Iguaçu National Park (Brazil). The two parks were designated UNESCO World Heritage Sites in 1984 and 1986, respectively.

The first proposal for a Brazilian national park aimed at providing a pristine environment to "future generations", just as "it had been created by God" and endowed with "all possible preservation, from the beautiful to the sublime, from the picturesque to the awesome" and "an unmatched flora" located in the "magnificent Iguaçu waterfalls". These were the words used by André Rebouças, an engineer, in his book Provinces of Paraná, Railways to Mato Grosso and Bolivia, which started up the campaign aimed at preserving the Iguaçu Falls in 1876. At this time, Yellowstone National Park in the US, the first national park in the world, was four years old.

On the Brazilian side, a walkway along the canyon has an extension to the lower base of Devil's Throat. Helicopter rides offering aerial views of the falls have been available from Brazil, but Argentina has prohibited such helicopter tours because of the adverse environmental impact on the flora and fauna of the falls.

Aerolíneas Argentinas has direct flights from Buenos Aires to Iguazu International Airport. Azul, GOL, and LATAM Brasil offer services from main Brazilian cities to Foz do Iguaçu. From Foz do Iguaçu airport, the park may be reached by taking a taxi or bus to the entrance of the park. Their park has an entrance fee on both sides. Once inside, free and frequent buses are provided to various points within the park. The town of Foz do Iguaçu is about 20 km (12 mi) away, and the airport is between the park and the town.

The Argentine access, across the forest, is by a Rainforest Ecological Train very similar to the one in Disney's Animal Kingdom. The train brings visitors to the entrance of Devil's Throat, as well as the upper and lower trails. The Paseo Garganta del Diablo is a 1 km-long (0.6 mi) trail that brings visitors directly over the falls of Devil's Throat, the highest and deepest of the falls. Other walkways allow access to the elongated stretch of falls across the forest on the Argentine side and to the boats that connect to San Martin Island. Also on the Argentine side, inflatable boat services take visitors very close to the falls.

The Brazilian transportation system aims at allowing an increase in the number of visitors, while reducing the adverse environmental impact, through an increase in the average number of passengers per vehicle inside the park. The new transportation system has a 72-passenger capacity and panoramic-view, double-deck buses.

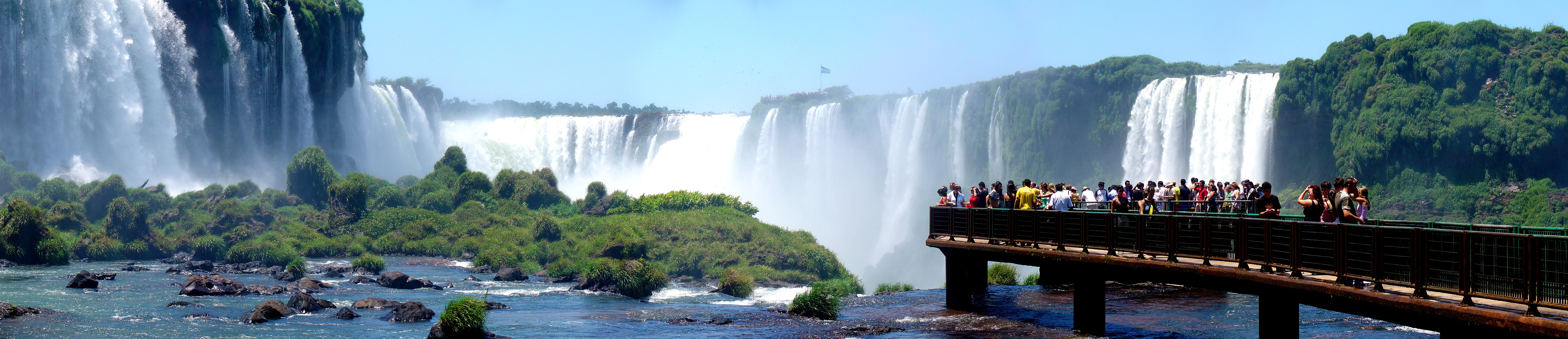
A walkway allows a panoramic view of the falls from the Brazilian side.

== Comparison with other notable falls ==
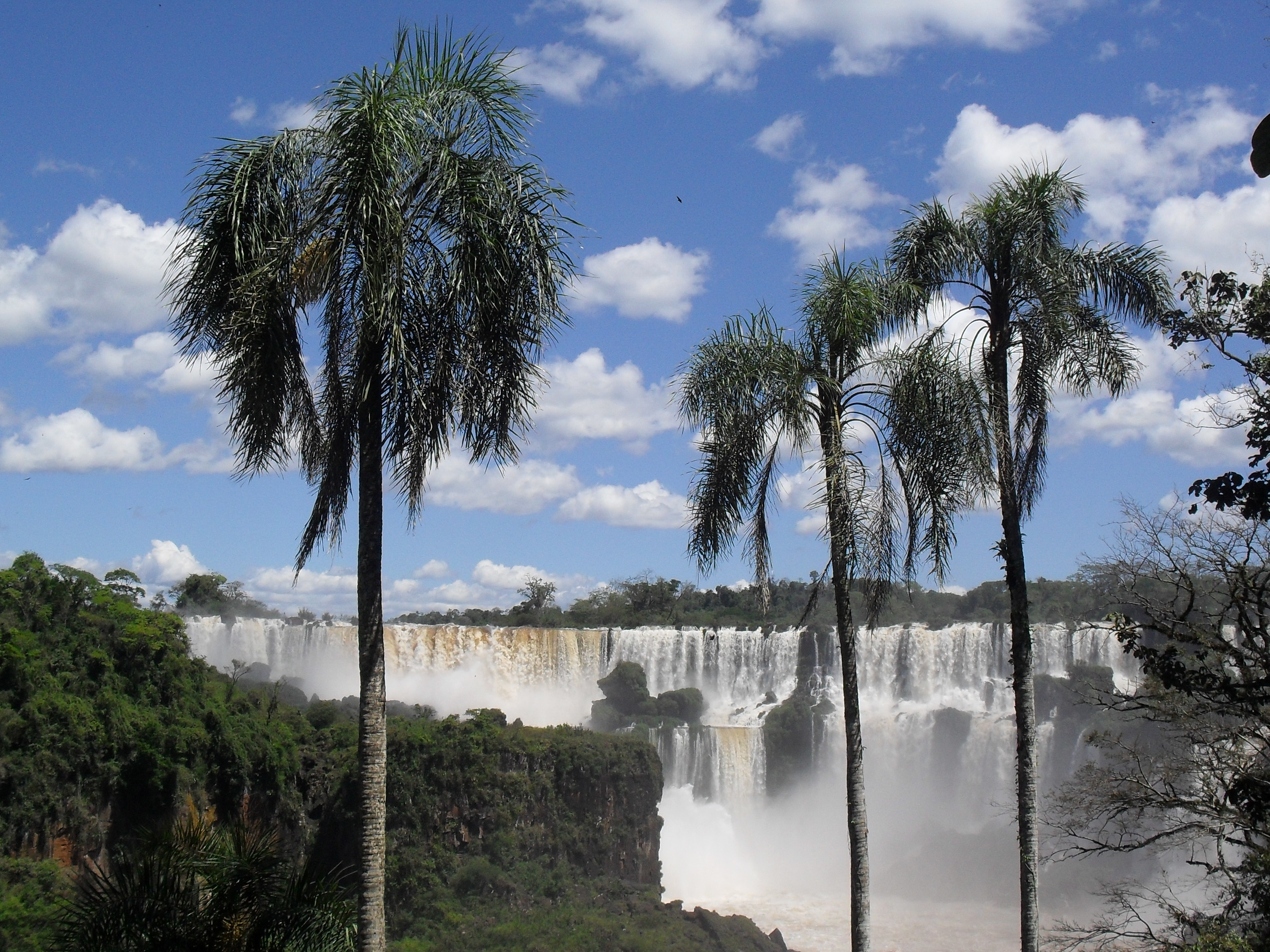
View of the Iguazú falls from the viewpoint that is in the lower circuit.

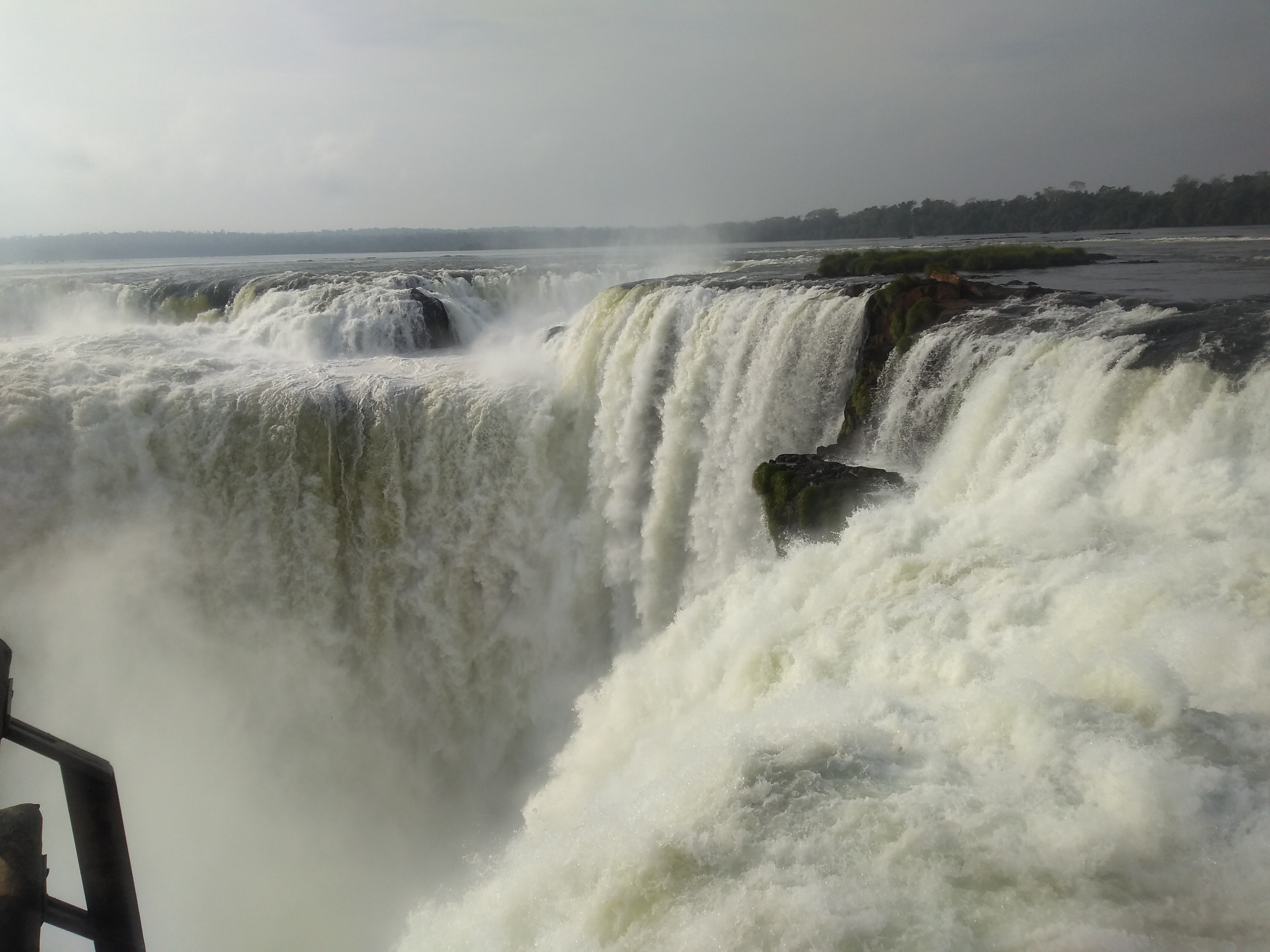
Iguazu Falls in July 2018.

Upon seeing Iguazu, the United States First Lady Eleanor Roosevelt reportedly exclaimed, "Poor Niagara!" (which, at 50 m or 165 feet, are a third shorter). Often, Iguazu also is compared with Victoria Falls in Southern Africa, which separates Zambia and Zimbabwe. Iguazu is wider but is split into roughly 275 distinct falls and large islands, whereas Victoria has the largest curtain of water in the world, at more than 1,600 m (5,249 ft) wide and over 100 m (328 ft) in height (in low flow, Victoria is split into five by islands but in high flow, it may be uninterrupted). The only wider falls are extremely large rapid-like falls, such as the Boyoma Falls (Stanley Falls).

With the flooding of the Guaíra Falls in 1982, Iguazu currently has the sixth-greatest average annual flow of any waterfall in the world, following number five Niagara, with an average rate of 1,746 m^{3}/s (61,660 cu ft/s). Its maximum recorded flow was 45,700 m^{3}/s (1,614,000 cu ft/s) on 9 June 2014. By comparison, the average flow of Niagara Falls is 2,400 m^{3}/s (85,000 cu ft/s), with a maximum recorded flow of 8,300 m^{3}/s (293,000 cu ft/s). The average flow at Victoria Falls is 1,088 m^{3}/s (38,420 cu ft/s), with a maximum recorded flow of 7,100 m^{3}/s (250,000 cu ft/s).

Size and flow rate of Victoria Falls with Niagara Falls and Iguazu for comparison
| Parameters | Victoria Falls | Niagara Falls | Iguazu Falls |
|---|---|---|---|
| Height | 108 m (354 ft) | 51 m (167 ft) | 64–82 m (210–269 ft) |
| Width | 1,708 m (5,604 ft) | 1,203 m (3,947 ft) | 2,700 m (8,900 ft) |
| Flow rate units (vol/s) | m^{3}/s (cu ft/s) | m^{3}/s (cu ft/s) | m^{3}/s (cu ft/s) |
| Mean annual flow | 1,088 m^{3} (38,400 cu ft) | 2,407 m^{3} (85,000 cu ft) | 1,746 m^{3} (61,700 cu ft) |
| Highest recorded flow | 12,800 m^{3} (450,000 cu ft) | 6,800 m^{3} (240,000 cu ft) | 45,700 m^{3} (1,610,000 cu ft) |
Notes: See references for explanation of measurements. For water, cubic metres per second = tonnes per second. Half the water approaching Niagara is diverted for hydroelectric power. Iguazu has two drops; height is given for the biggest drop and total height. 10 falls have greater or equal flow rates, but are not as high as Iguazu and Victoria Falls.

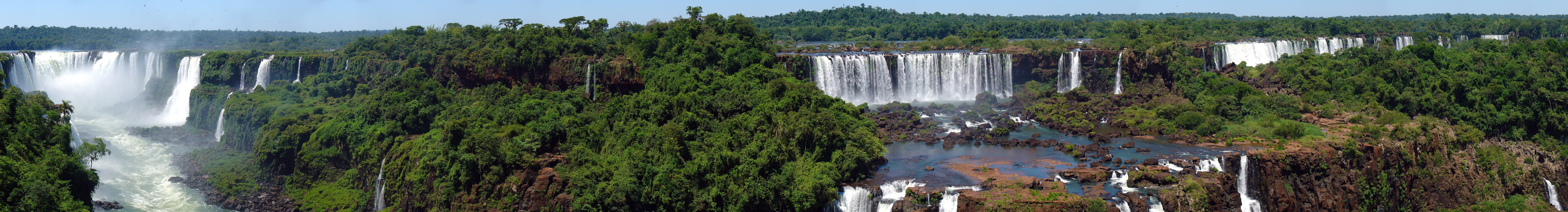
Some of the falls on the Argentine side of the Iguazu Falls, seen from the Brazilian shore.

== Climate ==
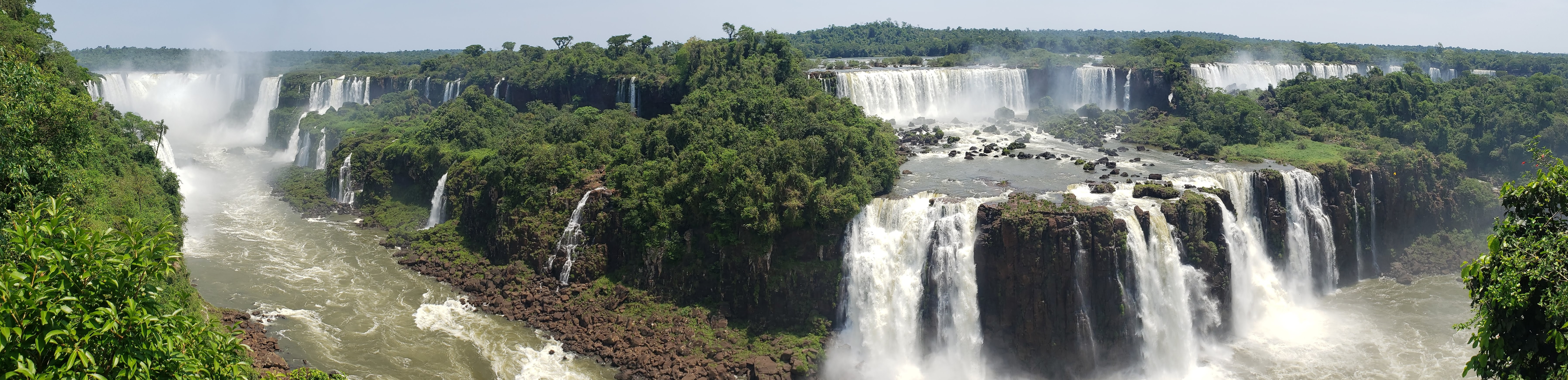
Iguazu Falls as seen from the Brazilian side in 2019

The Iguazu Falls experience a humid subtropical climate (Cfa, according to the Köppen climate classification) with abundant precipitation and high temperatures year-round. During the summer of 2006, a severe drought caused the Iguazu River to become diminished, reducing the amount of water flowing over the falls to 300 cubic metres per second (11,000 cu ft/s) until early December. This was unusual, as dry periods normally last only a few weeks. The period with the greatest volume of water flowing over the falls is usually December to February, coinciding with one of the periods of greatest rainfall.

Climate data for Iguazu Falls (Foz do Iguacu), Brazil
| Month | Jan | Feb | Mar | Apr | May | Jun | Jul | Aug | Sep | Oct | Nov | Dec | Year |
|---|---|---|---|---|---|---|---|---|---|---|---|---|---|
| Record high °C (°F) | 40.0 (104.0) | 40.0 (104.0) | 38.8 (101.8) | 36.8 (98.2) | 36.0 (96.8) | 32.0 (89.6) | 31.3 (88.3) | 35.0 (95.0) | 36.8 (98.2) | 39.0 (102.2) | 38.6 (101.5) | 39.4 (102.9) | 40.0 (104.0) |
| Mean daily maximum °C (°F) | 33.0 (91.4) | 32.6 (90.7) | 31.1 (88.0) | 28.2 (82.8) | 25.2 (77.4) | 23.1 (73.6) | 23.7 (74.7) | 25.3 (77.5) | 26.9 (80.4) | 28.8 (83.8) | 31.0 (87.8) | 32.6 (90.7) | 28.5 (83.3) |
| Daily mean °C (°F) | 25.5 (77.9) | 25.4 (77.7) | 23.8 (74.8) | 20.8 (69.4) | 17.7 (63.9) | 15.8 (60.4) | 15.7 (60.3) | 17.5 (63.5) | 19.0 (66.2) | 21.4 (70.5) | 23.1 (73.6) | 25.1 (77.2) | 20.9 (69.6) |
| Mean daily minimum °C (°F) | 19.6 (67.3) | 20.0 (68.0) | 18.4 (65.1) | 15.4 (59.7) | 12.2 (54.0) | 10.4 (50.7) | 9.7 (49.5) | 11.3 (52.3) | 13.5 (56.3) | 15.3 (59.5) | 16.5 (61.7) | 18.6 (65.5) | 15.1 (59.2) |
| Record low °C (°F) | 9.2 (48.6) | 6.8 (44.2) | 5.2 (41.4) | 3.0 (37.4) | −1.0 (30.2) | −3.1 (26.4) | −4.2 (24.4) | 0.0 (32.0) | 1.0 (33.8) | 5.0 (41.0) | 6.3 (43.3) | 3.8 (38.8) | −4.2 (24.4) |
| Average precipitation mm (inches) | 196.0 (7.72) | 180.1 (7.09) | 174.8 (6.88) | 151.0 (5.94) | 127.6 (5.02) | 138.3 (5.44) | 84.4 (3.32) | 107.4 (4.23) | 146.6 (5.77) | 219.8 (8.65) | 153.7 (6.05) | 189.0 (7.44) | 1,868.7 (73.57) |
| Average precipitation days (≥ 1.0 mm) | 9 | 9 | 8 | 8 | 6 | 8 | 6 | 8 | 8 | 9 | 7 | 9 | 95 |
| Average relative humidity (%) | 77 | 80 | 82 | 85 | 86 | 85 | 83 | 80 | 79 | 78 | 75 | 74 | 80.3 |
| Mean monthly sunshine hours | 230.5 | 196.3 | 209.9 | 193.6 | 180.8 | 151.2 | 168.7 | 157.9 | 146.4 | 195.6 | 231.4 | 232.3 | 2,294.6 |
Source: INMET

== Popular culture ==
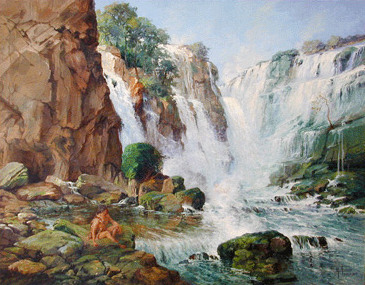
The waterfalls in a 1920 painting by Antônio Parreiras

Iguazu Falls has been featured in several TV shows and films, including:

- Tarzan (1966–1968)
- Moonraker (1979)
- The Mission (1986)
- The NeverEnding Story II: The Next Chapter (1990)
- Baraka (1992)
- Extermineitors IV: Como hermanos gemelos (1992)
- Happy Together (1997)
- Mr. Magoo (1997)
- Indiana Jones and the Kingdom of the Crystal Skull (2008)
- Soarin' Around the World (2016)
- Black Panther (2018)

== See also ==
- List of waterfalls
- List of waterfalls by flow rate
