= Guillermo Francella =

Argentine actor and comedian (born 1955)

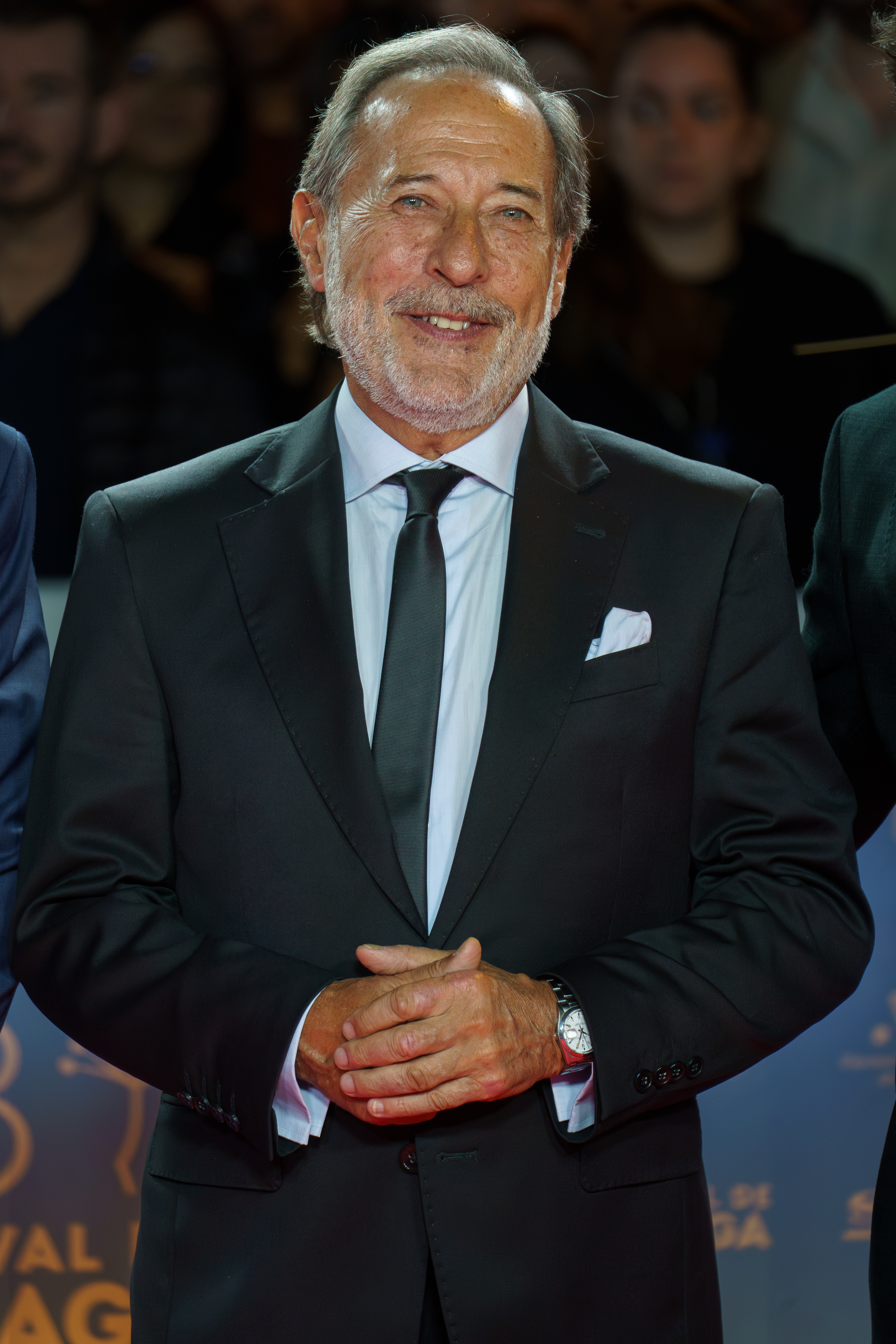
- Francella in 2025
- Born: Guillermo Héctor Francella; February 14, 1955 (age 71); Buenos Aires, Argentina
- Occupations: Actor; comedian
- Years active: 1973–present
- Spouse: Marynés Breña (m. 1989)
- Children: Nicolás; Johanna

Guillermo Héctor Francella (Latin American Spanish pronunciation: [giˈʃeɾmo fɾanˈtʃela]; born 14 February 1955) is an Argentine actor and comedian. Besides a long history of working as a television leading man, he also has a varied theatrical and film career. Francella is widely regarded by experts and critics of performance as one of the most influential and popular actors of his country.

== Biography ==
Guillermo Francella is the second of two brothers, children of Ricardo Héctor Francella, a bank employee, gym teacher and weightlifting coach at Racing Club and Adelina Redondo. He spent his first two years of life in Villa del Parque, Buenos Aires, Argentina and later the family moved to Béccar, a northern neighborhood of Greater Buenos Aires where Francella lived for the rest of his childhood. The house was located next to that of his paternal grandparents, Domenico and Zaída; his grandfather was an Italian immigrant in Argentina who had arrived in Argentina from Falconara Albanese, Calabria and whose original last name was Frangella.

He attended and received a bachelor's degree from the Institute June 20 of San Isidro, Buenos Aires, Argentina in 1972. Later, although he wanted to study theater, he continued studying journalism. He got a journalist's degree after studying for three years and later started working for the magazine Gente, where he served as a journalist for three months before being fired. He also worked as a clothing seller in a store, as an insurance salesman and as a member of a real estate company with his uncle. His father died when Francella was twenty-six years old, which was "a very strong blow" to his family.

Francella is a catholic.

== Career ==
His first approach to acting was after finishing high school when he made a play with some classmates, the comedy Charlatanes by Julio F. Escobar. In the early 1980s he acted in a commercial for Cinzano. He debuted on television in 1980, with Los hnos. Torterolo and then was part of Historia de un trepador. In 1985 he filmed his first film, El telo y la tele, also participated as an extra in the film Los caballeros de la cama redonda starring Alberto Olmedo and Jorge Porcel. He participated in other television series of the 1980s, such as El infiel, playing the role of Felipe for a year. In 1986, he filmed three films, among them Camarero nocturno en Mar del Plata and Las colegialas. He also acted in television series, such as El lobo and Juegos prohibidos. His career as a television and film actor continued during the following years with films such as Los pilotos más locos del mundo, Paraíso relax and Bañeros II, la playa loca, which had its third part in 2006. His first big hit on television was telecomedy De carne somos, broadcast by Canal 13 in 1988. After this strip he starred in Dalo por hecho, broadcast by Canal 13, playing an Argentine chanta (a scammer). Francella also made two TV series that were very popular at the time, La familia Benvenuto and Un hermano es un hermano, with Javier Portales.

In 1989 he starred in one of his greatest successes on film, the action comedy Los extermineitors, which worked mainly as a spoof on the action films of the 1980s. The following year, he filmed Extermineitors II, la venganza del dragón, the sequel and second part of the "Extermineitors saga" of comedy films; that same saga eventually became spawned into the 1992 action-comedy series Brigada Cola, an Extermineitors spinoff where Francella played the protagonist, Francachella. Brigada Cola was a big rating success that even became a short-lived theater version of the show with the same cast. During the early 1990s, Francella starred in two more sequels for Los extermineitors, with the saga coming to an end with the fourth part in the southern summer of 1992. When he returned to work on TV his fame had grown exponentially, even internationally, which is why his next series, Naranja y media was translated into English and broadcast in several countries under the title My Better Halves. His next movie, Un Argentino en New York, was filmed in Spain and United States; starring alongside the Uruguayan actress/singer Natalia Oreiro, it became one of the greatest Argentine cinema hits.

1999 came with a new challenge as an actor, the series Trillizos, dijo la partera with the actress Laura Novoa. On this occasion, he had to play three Buenos Aires brothers, Luigi, Marcelo and Enzo, that integrated a classic family of Italian roots, but in turn, each with a different personality that characterized them. In 2000 he filmed Papá es un ídolo it was translated in English with the name of Daddy is My Idol in this movie Manuel Bandera and Millie Stegman. He returned to television in 2001, in one of the most definitive roles of his career, in the comic program Poné a Francella, where he took part in several sketches next to his cast. He had two seasons and aired until December 2002. There he shared the cast with Gabriel Goity, Alberto Fernández de Rosa, Roberto Carnaghi, Florencia Peña, Andrea Frigerio, Mariana Briski, Manuel Wirtz, René Bertrand, Toti Ciliberto and Cecilia Milone and with newly emerged models such as Pamela David, Luciana Salazar and Julieta Prandi. The repetitions were broadcast until 2006 during the weekends in Argentina, while in other countries of Latin America and United States it was televised until the end of 2004. In 2003, he filmed in Cuba, Un día en el paraíso, movie in which Guillermo Francella played two characters, Reynaldo and Roy. That year he starred in the unit comedy, Durmiendo con mi jefe, with Luis Brandoni broadcast by Canal 13.

His next movie, Papá se volvió loco, was released in 2005 and became a hit in theaters. From 2005 to 2006 he starred in the series Casados con Hijos, an Argentine remake of Married... with Children, playing the role of José "Pepe" Argento. For that role, in the first season, Asociación de Periodistas de la Televisión y la Radiofonía Argentinas awarded the Martín Fierro Award to the "Best Leading Actor in Comedy", and in the second season, he was nominated again but lost to Facundo Arana. During these two years, he starred with Enrique Pinti at the Lola Membrives theater in Buenos Aires and then at the Auditorium Mar del Plata the musical comedy The Producers, a great success with both the public and critics. It was Francella's debut in the musical genre.

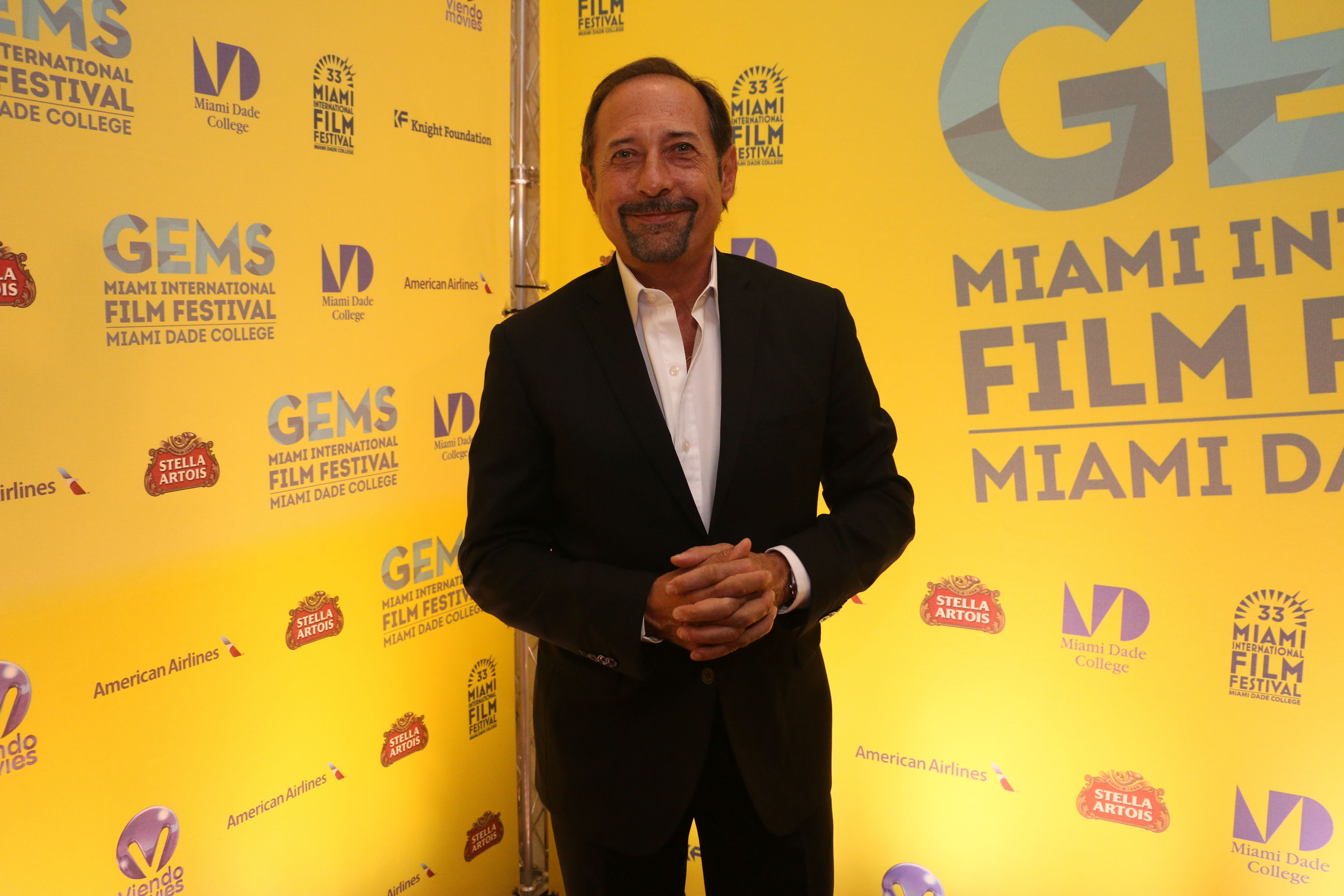
Francella attending the Miami International Film Festival in 2016

In 2007 he starred in a new comic film, Incorregibles, together with comedian Dady Brieva and model Gisela Van Lacke. The film was a box-office success, but received negative reviews by the critics. In 2008, he made a special participation in the final chapter of the soap opera Vidas robadas which won the Martín Fierro de Oro Award 2008. At the end of the year, he traveled to Mexico to star Rudo y Cursi along with the Mexican actors Gael García Bernal and Diego Luna. In 2009, he starred alongside Ricardo Darín and Soledad Villamil in El secreto de sus ojos which sold approximately two million tickets and became the most watched movie of the year, as well as the second most successful national film of all time in its country. The movie won an Oscar for the best non-English speaking film.

In 2011, he returned to the small screen with the TV comedy El hombre de tu vida, where he played the role of Hugo, a man affected by a midlife crisis who decides to work professionally as a gigolo. In addition, along with Arturo Puig, he starred in the Ana Katz comedy film Los Marziano. In 2012 saw the premiere of the comedy film ¡Atraco!, starring Francella alongside Nicolás Cabré and Amaia Salamanca under the direction of Eduard Cortés, playing a fictional Peronist named Merello. In addition, he had a small role in the film El vagoneta en el mundo del cine. In 2013, he starred in the Marcos Carnevale romantic film, Corazón de León, where he played León Godoy, a short-stature man who falls in love with Ivana Cornejo (Julieta Díaz) a divorced lawyer. For this interpretation he received his second nomination for Silver Condor Award, this time as Best Actor.

In 2014, he starred with Inés Estévez and Alejandro Awada in the comedy-drama El misterio de la felicidad, directed by Daniel Burman. Francella plays the role of a man looking for his missing friend while falling in love with his friend's wife. In addition, Francella returned to the theater and starring along Adrián Suar in Dos pícaros sinvergüenzas, where he plays Lawrence Williams, a man who scams women together with his partner. In 2015 he starred in The Clan, a crime thriller-historical film about the murders committed by the "Clan Puccio" in the early 1980s; Francella starred in the role of Arquimedes Puccio together with Peter Lanzani in the role of Alejandro Puccio, and directed by Pablo Trapero. The film was a box-office success and received an overall positive response by the critics.

== Personal life ==
Since 1989 he has been married to Marynés Breña, with whom he has two children, Nicolás Francella (born on October 22, 1990) and Johanna Francella (born on December 4, 1993).

== Filmography ==
=== Film ===
Year	Movie	Role	Director
1973	Los caballeros de la cama redonda	(Uncredited)	Gerardo Sofovich
1985	El Telo y la Tele	Deputy	Hugo Sofovich
1986	Brigada explosiva	Bank robber	Enrique Dawi
1986	Camarero Nocturno en Mar del Plata	Salvador	Gerardo Sofovich
1986	Las colegialas se divierten	Professor	Fernando Siro
1987	Johny Tolengo, el majestuoso		Gerardo Sofovich and Enrique Dawi
1987	Los Bañeros más Locos del Mundo	Guillermo	Carlos Galettini
1988	Los Pilotos más Locos del Mundo	Professor Lungo	Carlos Galettini
1988	Paraíso Relax		Emilio Boretta
1989	Bañeros II, la playa loca	Guillermo	Carlos Galettini
1989	Los extermineitors	Guillermo	Carlos Galettini
1990	Yo Tenía un Plazo Fijo	Pancho	Emilio Boretta
1990	Extermineitors II, la venganza del dragón	Guillermo	Carlos Galettini
1991	Extermineitors III, la gran pelea final	Guillermo	Carlos Galettini
1991	El travieso	Julio Mustafá	Ismael Hase and Eduardo Rolondo
1992	Extermineitors IV, como hermanos gemelos	Guillermo	Carlos Galettini
1998	Un Argentino en New York	Franco de Ricci	Juan José Jusid
1999	Esa maldita costilla	Taxista	Juan José Jusid
2000	Papá es un Ídolo	Pablo	Juan José Jusid
2003	Un día en el paraíso	Reynaldo/Roy	Juan Bautista Stagnaro
2005	Papá se volvió loco	Juan	Rodolfo Ledo
2006	Bañeros III, Todopoderosos	Guillermo	Rodolfo Ledo
2007	Incorregibles	Pablo	Rodolfo Ledo
2008	Rudo y Cursi	Batuta	Carlos Cuarón
2008	Un novio para mi mujer	Real estate employee	Juan Taratuto
2009	El secreto de sus ojos	Pablo Sandoval	Juan José Campanella
2011	Los Marziano	Juan Marziano	Ana Katz
2012	El vagoneta en el mundo del cine		Maximiliano Gutiérrez
2012	¡Atraco!	Merello	Eduard Cortés
2013	Corazón de León	León Godoy	Marcos Carnevale
2014	El misterio de la felicidad	Santiago	Daniel Burman
2015	The Clan	Arquímedes Puccio	Pablo Trapero
2017	Los que aman, odian	Dr. Enrique Hubermann	Alejandro Maci
2018	Animal	Antonio Decoud	Armando Bo II
2018	Mi obra maestra	Arturo Silva	Gastón Duprat
2019	Olmedo, el rey de la risa	Himself	Mariano Olmedo
2020	El robo del siglo	Mario Vitette	Ariel Winograd
2022	All Hail (film)	Miguel Flores	Marcos Carnevale
2023	La extorsión	Alejandro Petrossián	Martino Zaidelis
2025	Playa de Lobos	Klaus	
2025	Homo Argentum	16 characters	Mariano Cohn and Gastón Duprat

=== Television ===
Year	Title	Character	Channel	Notes
1980	Los hermanos Torterolo		Canal 13	
1982	Todos los días la misma historia	Butcher	Telefe	
1983	Matrimonios y algo más		Canal 13	Supporting actor
1984	Historia de un trepador		Canal 13	Supporting actor
1985	El infiel	Felipe	Canal 9	Supporting actor
1986	El lobo	Lalo	Canal 9	Supporting actor
1987	Buena plata		Telefe	Co-star
1987	Paremos la mano		Telefe	Co-star
1988-1989	De carne somos	Ricardo Rípoli	Canal 13	Protagonist
1990	Yo tenía un plazo fijo	Pancho	Canal 13	Protagonist
1990	Dalo por hecho	Atilio Bartolomé Cartuja	Canal 13	Protagonist
1991-1995	La familia Benvenuto	Guille	Telefe	Protagonist
1992-1993	Brigada cola	Francachella	Telefe	Protagonist
1994-1995	Un hermano es un hermano	Bruno	Telefe	Protagonist
1997	Naranja y media	Juan Guerrero	Telefe	Protagonist
1999	Trillizos, dijo la partera	Marcelo/Luigi/Enzo Scarpelli	Telefe	Protagonist
2000	Tiempo final	Martín and Miguel	Telefe	Ep: "La última cena" Ep: "Los amigos"
2001	EnAmorArte	Rowing teacher	Telefe	Special participation
2001-2002	Poné a Francella		Telefe	Protagonist
2002	Infieles	Marcos Marini	Telefe	Ep: "Las mujeres de mis amigos no tienen sexo"
2003	Durmiendo con mi jefe	Oscar Tzisca	Canal 13	Protagonist
2004	La niñera	Sambucetti	Telefe	Cameo
2005-2006	Casados con hijos	José "Pepe" Argento	Telefe	Protagonist
2007	Alejo y Valentina	Himself	MTV	Cameo
2008	Vidas robadas	Claudio Kurtz	Telefe	Special participation
2009	Revelaciones	psychologist	Canal 13	Special participation
2011-2012	El hombre de tu vida	Hugo Bermúdez	Telefe	Protagonist
2018	El host	Himself	FOX	Special participation
2022	El encargado (The Boss)	Eliseo	Star+	Lead actor

=== Theater ===
Year	Title	Character
1988	Los salvajes deseos de mi marido	
1988-1989	Al fin y al cabo... de carne somos	
1991	Dos señores malcriados	
1992	Pijamas	
1993	Aguante, Brigada!	
2001	La cena de los tontos	beside Adrián Suar
2005-2006	Los productores	beside Enrique Pinti
2009	La cena de los tontos	beside Adrián Suar
2009	El joven Frankenstein	
2010	The Sunshine Boys	
2014	Dos pícaros sinvergüenzas	beside Adrián Suar
2016	Nuestras mujeres	beside Arturo Puig and Jorge Marrale
2018	Perfectos desconocidos	
2023	Casados con hijos	

== Awards and nominations ==
Year	Award	Category	Work	Result
1988	Martín Fierro Awards	Best Actor in Comedy	De carne somos	Winner
1992	Martín Fierro Awards	Best Actor in Comedy	Brigada cola	Nominated
1994	Martín Fierro Awards	Best Actor in Comedy	La familia Benvenuto	Nominated
1997	Martín Fierro Awards	Best Actor in Comedy	Naranja y media	Winner
1999	Martín Fierro Awards	Best Actor in Comedy	Trillizos, dijo la partera	Nominated
2002	Martín Fierro Awards	Best Humorous Work	Poné a Francella	Winner
2003	Martín Fierro Awards	Best Actor in Comedy	Durmiendo con mi jefe	Nominated
2005	Martín Fierro Awards	Best Actor in Comedy	Casados con Hijos	Winner
2006	Martín Fierro Awards	Best Actor in Comedy	Casados con Hijos	Nominated
2008	Martín Fierro Awards	Best Special Participation in Fiction	Vidas robadas	Winner
2009	Sur Awards	Best Supporting Actor	El secreto de sus ojos	Winner
2009	Clarín Awards	Best Supporting Actor in Cinema	El secreto de sus ojos	Winner
2009	Ariel Awards	Best Supporting Actor	El secreto de sus ojos	Nominated
2010	CEC Awards	Best Supporting Actor in Cinema	El secreto de sus ojos	Winner
2010	Silver Condor Awards	Best Supporting Actor	El secreto de sus ojos	Winner
2011	Martín Fierro Awards	Best leading actor in miniseries	El hombre de tu vida	Nominated
2011	Konex Foundation	Konex de Platino for the Best Television Actor of the Decade		Winner
2011	Estrella de Mar Award	Protagonic Male Performance	Los reyes de la risa	Nominated
2012	Martín Fierro Awards	Best leading actor in miniseries	El hombre de tu vida	Winner
2013	Sur Awards	Best Actor	Corazón de León	Nominated
2014	Silver Condor Awards	Best Actor	Corazón de León	Nominated
2015	Sur Awards	Best Actor	The Clan	Nominated
2015	Estrella de Mar Award	Protagonic Male Comedy Performance	Dos pícaros sinvergüenzas	Winner
2015	Estrella de Mar Award	Premio Estrella de Mar de Oro	Dos pícaros sinvergüenzas	Winner
2016	Silver Condor Awards	Best Actor	The Clan	Nominated
2016	Platino Awards	Premio Platino for Best Male Performance	The Clan	Winner
