= Oriana Sabatini =

Argentine model, actress and singer (born 1996)

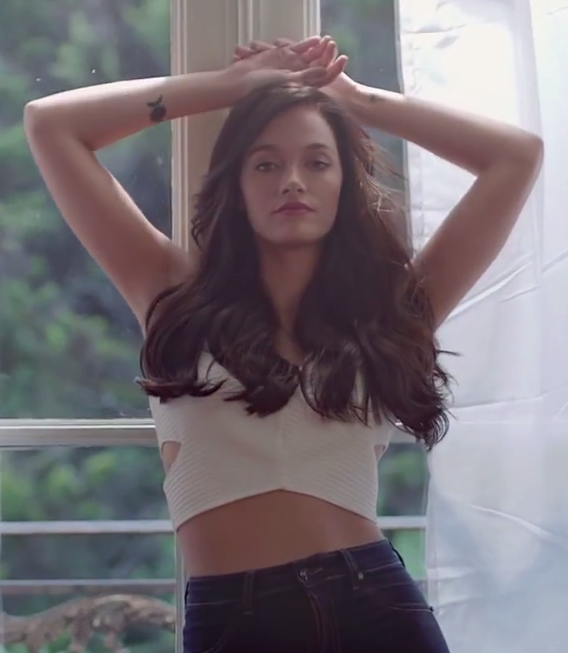
- Sabatini in 2019
- Born: Oriana Gabriela Sabatini; April 19, 1996 (age 30); Buenos Aires, Argentina
- Occupations: Model, actress, singer, writer
- Years active: 2011–present
- Spouse: Paulo Dybala (2024-)
- Partner: Julián Serrano (2014–2017)
- Children: 1
- Mother: Catherine Fulop
- Relatives: Gabriela Sabatini (aunt)

Oriana Gabriela Sabatini (born 19 April 1996) is an Argentine model, actress, singer and writer.

== Early life and education ==
Oriana Gabriela Sabatini was born on 19 April 1996 in Buenos Aires, Argentina. She is the daughter of the entrepreneur and former Argentine actor with Italian citizenship Osvaldo Sabatini and the Venezuelan actress Catherine Fulop. She has a sister three years younger named, Tiziana Beatriz Sabatini.

Oriana Sabatini is the niece of the renowned professional tennis player, Gabriela Sabatini. She began her artistic training at a very young age, studying singing, piano and theater. Her studies include two years at the Julio Chávez acting training Institute and one year at the New York Film Academy.

== Career ==
=== Modeling career ===
Her first individual modeling was at 13 for a magazine, in an article about her relationship with the mother. In 2017, she participated with the brand L'Oréal doing an advertising campaign about their Casting Creme Gloss products.

=== Television career ===
Her first television performance was in 2011 in the Uruguayan telenovela Porque te quiero así.

In 2012, she was summoned by Cris Morena to be part of the cast of Aliados. From 2013 to 2014, she was part of the cast of the youth television series Aliados. In 2014, she made the theatrical seasons of Aliados.

In 2018, she made her film debut, with the movie Perdida.

In 2018, she was the protagonist of the television series Medusa with Esteban Lamothe.

In 2019, she acted in the Spanish film ¿Qué te juegas?.

In 2019, she was the protagonist of the television series Secreto bien guardado with Victorio D'Alessandro.

In 2019, she was the protagonist of the movie Rosario: un clásico de amor y fútbol with Nicolás Furtado.

=== Singing career ===
In April 2017, she began her solo career with the release of her first single in English, «Love Me Down Easy». Then she participated in June in the opening of the well-known program called ShowMatch conducted by Marcelo Tinelli, singing «Love Me Down Easy».

On July 5, she appeared as a backup artist on Ariana Grande Dangerous Woman Tour singing her first single «Love Me Down Easy» and two new songs: «Stay Or Run» and «What U Gonna Do».

On September 21 she appeared as a solo artist at Usina del Arte, Ciudad Emergente, a show for new artists.

On November 14 and 15 of the same year he was the opening act for the band Coldplay, who finished their A Head Full of Dream tour in Argentina, performing at the Unico Stadium in La Plata.

In 2018, she performed at the Lollapalooza Argentina festival, sharing the stage with the American band Red Hot Chili Peppers.

== Personal life ==
On October 31 of 2023, Sabatini got engaged to Argentine footballer, Paulo Dybala, and on July 20, 2024, they got married in Buenos Aires. Their daughter, Gia, was born in 2026.

== Filmography ==
=== Television ===
Year	Title	Character	Channel
2011	Porque te quiero así	Rocío	Canal 10
2013-2014	Aliados	Azul Medina/Luz	Telefe/Fox
2018	Medusa		Telefe
2019	Secreto bien guardado	Amalia Peres Kiev	CINE.AR

=== Television Programs ===
Year	Program	Channel	Notes
2013	Fans en Vivo	FWTV	Guest
2013	Gracias por venir, gracias por estar	Telefe	Guest
2014	AM, antes del mediodía	Telefe	Guest
2014	Susana Gimenéz	Telefe	Guest
2014	Fans en Vivo	FWTV	Guest
2014	Tu cara me suena (Season 2)	Telefe	Replaces Ángela Torres as Katy Perry
2014	Tu cara me suena (Season 2)	Telefe	Join Ángela Torres as Aino Jawo
2014	Tu cara me suena (Season 2)	Telefe	Join Pichu Straneo as Christina Aguilera
2014	Almorzando con Mirtha Legrand	Canal 13	Guest
2014	Gracias por venir, gracias por estar	Telefe	Guest
2015	Pura Química	ESPN+	Guest
2016	Fans en Vivo	FWTV	Guest
2017	Fans en Vivo	FWTV	Guest
2017	Bailando 2017	Canal 13	Guest
2017	Susana Gimenéz	Telefe	Guest
2017	Los ángeles de la mañana	Canal 13	Guest
2018	Cortá por Lozano	Telefe	Guest
2019	Cortá por Lozano	Telefe	Guest
2019	Los ángeles de la mañana	Canal 13	Guest
2020	Cortá por Lozano	Telefe	Guest
2020	Fans en Vivo	FWTV	Guest
2020	Los ángeles de la mañana	Canal 13	Guest

=== Theater ===
Year	Title	Character	Director	Theater
2014	Aliados, el musical	Azul Medina	Cris Morena	Teatro Gran Rex
2014	El Club del Hit	Herself		

=== Movies ===
Year	Movie	Character	Director
2018	Perdida	Alina Zambrano	Alejandro Montiel
2019	Rosario: un clásico de amor y fútbol	Paola	Bruno Hernández
2019	¿Qué te juegas?	Camila	Inés de León

=== Videoclips ===
Year	Artist	Song
2014	Julián Serrano	Love is Louder ft. Oriana Sabatini
2015	Julián Serrano	Yo te Protejo
2019	Emilia Mernes ft. Darell	No Soy Yo

== Awards and nominations ==
Year	Award	Category	Work	Result
2013	TKM Awards	Actress Revelation	Aliados	Winner
2013	TKM Awards	Look TKM	Herself	Nominated
2013	Kids' Choice Awards Argentina	Revelation	Aliados	Winner
2014	Kids' Choice Awards Argentina	Favorite Actress	Aliados	Winner
2015	MTV Millennial Awards	Argentine Instagramer of the Year	Herself	Nominated
2015	Kids' Choice Awards Argentina	Goddess	Herself	Winner
2015	Los Más Clickeados Awards	Most Rated Celebrities of the Year	Herself	Winner
2016	MTV Millennial Awards	Argentine Snapchatero of the Year	Herself	Winner
2016	Kids' Choice Awards Argentina	Trendy Girl	Herself	Nominated
2017	Kids' Choice Awards Argentina	Favorite National Artist or Group	Herself	Nominated
2017	Kids' Choice Awards Argentina	Favorite Latin Song	«Love Me Down Easy»	Nominated
2017	MTV Europe Music Awards	Best South Latin American Artist	Herself	Nominated
2018	Nickelodeon Kids' Choice Awards	Favorite Latin Music Star	Herself	Nominated
2018	Martín Fierro Awards	Best Music Video of the Year	«Love Me Down Easy»	Nominated
2018	Kids' Choice Awards Argentina	Favorite National Artist or Group	Herself	Nominated

== Discography ==
=== Soundtrack albums ===
- 2013 — Aliados
- 2014 — Aliados

=== As lead artist ===
List of singles as lead artist, with selected chart positions, showing year released
Title	Year	Peaks			Album
Title	Year	ARG	ARG Airplay	ARG National	Album
"Love Me Down Easy"	2017	—	17	2	Non-album singles
"Stay or Run"	2017	—	— (Note: "Stay or Run" did not enter the Argentina Airplay chart, but peaked at number eight on the Argentina Anglo Airplay chart.)	6	Non-album singles
"What U Gonna Do"	2018	—	— (Note: "What U Gonna Do" did not enter the Argentina Airplay chart, but peaked at number three on the Argentina Anglo Airplay chart.)	4	Non-album singles
"False Start"	2018	61	— (Note: "False Start" did not enter the Argentina Airplay chart, but peaked at number four on the Argentina Anglo Airplay chart.)	6	Non-album singles
"Mis Manos"	2019	—	—	15	Non-album singles
"El Último Tango"	2019	—	—	—	Non-album singles
"Luna Llena"	2020	72	14	2	Non-album singles
"Bad"	2020	—	—	—	Non-album singles
"Lo Que Tienes" (with Rusherking)	2020	37	20	4	Non-album singles
"TUYYO" (with FMK)	2021	76	—	9	Non-album singles
"Error"	2022	—	—	—	Non-album singles
"325"	2022	—	—	20	Non-album singles
"—" denotes a recording that did not chart or was not released in that territory.
