= Lost City Radio =

2007 novel by Daniel Alarcón

- First edition
- Author: Daniel Alarcón
- Language: English
- Genre: Novel
- Publisher: HarperCollins
- Publication date: January 30, 2007
- Publication place: United States
- Media type: Print (hardcover)
- Pages: 257 pp
- ISBN: 0-06-059479-9
- OCLC: 69423356
- Dewey Decimal: 813/.6 22
- LC Class: PS3601.L333 L67 2007

Lost City Radio is a 2007 novel written by Daniel Alarcón.

== Plot summary ==
After a ten-year insurrection set in a nameless South American country in which the totalitarian government defeated a rebel group, the government has eliminated all indigenous languages and renamed all places as numbers; radio is the only remaining convenience. The protagonist, Norma, is the voice of a popular radio show that attempts to reconnect war refugees with their families. Yet Norma too has lost during the war: her husband disappeared on a trip to a jungle village called 1797. One day a boy arrives from 1797 along with a list of missing for Norma to read over the radio, jarring Norma to recall the details of her life with her husband and his possible fate.

Though the novel is set in Latin America it does not contain a single word of Spanish. It has been remarked for the ability to describe the people's sense of displacement.

== Reviews ==
- "Blurring the moral lines: Fictional Latin American country is torn apart by violence" by John Freeman, Houston Chronicle, April 13, 2007.
