= Bank Rio robbery =

2006 Argentina bank robery

The Bank Rio robbery took place on 13 January 2006 in the town of Acassuso, Buenos Aires Province, Argentina. It involved Fernando Araujo, the leader and executor of the heist; Mario Vitette Sellanes, called by the media "the man in the gray suit"; Sebastián ("the Martian") and Alberto "Beto" de la Torre; together with the support of associates that did not enter the bank.

The robbery took place in the Banco Río branch, which was held up by a gang of six robbers armed with replica weapons. They took 23 hostages and emptied 147 safes of the bank deposits totaling nearly US $20 million.

== See also ==
- The Heist of the Century (film)
