= Extermineitors IV: Como hermanos gemelos =

- DVD cover
- Directed by: Carlos Galettini
- Written by: Salvador Valverde Calvo; Salvador Valverde Freire
- Produced by: Carlos Galettini
- Starring: Guillermo Francella; Aldo Barbero; Rand McClain; Javier Belgeri; Mike Kirton
- Cinematography: Héctor Collodoro; Carlos Torlaschi
- Edited by: Serafín Molina
- Music by: Lalo Fransen
- Production company: Argentina Sono Film
- Distributed by: Argentina Sono Film
- Release date: 23 January 1992
- Running time: 90 minutes
- Country: Argentina
- Language: Spanish

Extermineitors IV: Como hermanos gemelos (English language title: Exterminators 4: As Twin Brothers) is a 1992 Argentine comedy action film directed by Carlos Galettini and starring Guillermo Francella and Aldo Barbero. The central argument of the film is largely a parody-homage of the classic Schwarzenegger/DeVito comedy Twins. It premiered on 23 January 1992 in Buenos Aires.

== Synopsis ==
The leader of the Extermineitors task force, Colonel William, has discovered that the old enemy of the organization, Mc Clain, has left crime and lives quietly in Iguazu Falls. William wants Mc Clain to work for him and on the right side of the law. He develops a plan for his top man, Guillermo, to perform the mission of recruiting Mc Clain, by making him believe that Mc Clain is his long lost twin brother. From then on, Guillermo, and Mc Clain become friends and fight together against the old criminal organization of ninja robbers, now led by the vicious criminal known as The Albino.

== Cast ==
- Guillermo Francella ... Guillermo
- Aldo Barbero ... Colonel William
- Rand McClain ... Randolf Mc Clain (as Randolf Mc Clain)
- Javier Belgeri ... Nico
- Mike Kirton ... The Albino
- Verónica Varano ... Ana
- Marcela Labarca
- Charlie Nieto
- Jorge Montejo ... Paolo el Rockero
- Ricky Maravilla ... Himself
- Oscar Roy
- Alejandra Pradón
- Poupee Pradon
- Jorge Rial ... Hotel Manager
- Valeria Britos ... Sol
