= Johanna Francella =

Argentine actress (born 1993)

- Born: Johanna Inés Francella; December 4, 1993 (age 32); Palermo, Buenos Aires, Argentina
- Other name: Yoyi
- Occupation: Actress
- Years active: 2014–present
- Father: Guillermo Francella
- Family: Nicolás Francella (brother)

Johanna Inés Francella (born December 4, 1993) better known as Johanna "Yoyi" Francella is an Argentine actress. She is primarily known for her roles in Heidi, bienvenida a casa, Golpe al corazón and Millennials. She is also the daughter of actor Guillermo Francella and younger sister of fellow actor Nicolás Francella.

== Professional career ==
She began her career in the police soap opera Noche y día from eltrece, where she played the role of Jasmine, which marked her acting debut. The following year, Francella participated as the host of the program De girafa (of giraffe) (2015) along with Franco Nied, Camila Ambroggi and Tomás Allande on Radio y Punto. In 2016, she joined the main cast of the series Si solo si, broadcast by TV Pública and where she played Valentina.

In 2017, she played Vicky in the children's and youth series Heidi, bienvenida a casa of Nickelodeon. Shortly after, she was part of the main cast of the fiction Golpe al corazón from Telefe, where she played Celeste Farías, the love interest of Diego Figueroa (Stéfano de Gregorio). That same year, she co-starred in the play Justo en lo mejor de mi vida alongside Miguel Ángel Rodríguez, Julia Calvo, Diego Pérez and Pepe Monje at the Piccadilly Theater, directed by the actor Luis Brandoni.

Her next television job was in the Millennials series from Net TV, where she played the role of Alma Carrizo and shared the limelight with Nicolás Riera, Laura Laprida, Juan Manuel Guilera, Matías Mayer and Noelia Marzol.

In 2019, Johanna joined the cast of Argentina, tierra de amor y venganza where she played Malena, a photographer who works for the same newspaper as Lucía (Delfina Chaves).

== Filmography ==
=== Film ===
Year	Title	Role	Notes	Direction
2020	The Heist of the Century	Lucía Vitette Sellanes	Secondary character	Ariel Winograd

=== Television ===
Year	Title	Role	Notes	Direction
2014–2015	Noche y día	Jazmín	Supporting cast	eltrece
2016–2020	Si solo si	Valentina	Main cast	TV Pública
2017	Heidi, bienvenida a casa	Victoria "Vicky"	Supporting cast	Nickelodeon
2017–2018	Golpe al corazón	Celeste Farías	Supporting cast	Telefe
2018–2021	Millennials	Alma Carrizo	Main cast	Net TV
2019	Go! Live Your Way	Rosario	Supporting cast	Netflix
2019	Con amigos así	Co-conductora	Magazine	KZO
2019	Argentina, tierra de amor y venganza	Malena	Special participation	eltrece
2021	El mundo de Mateo	Carolina Talesnik	Guest star	Flow
2022	Los protectores	Sandra	Episode: "El único y último gol"	Star+
2022	El primero de nosotros	Zoe	Supporting cast	Telefe

=== Music videos ===
Year	Title	Role	Interpreter
2019	Apenas Son Las 12	Romantic interest	Ruggero Pasquarelli ft. MYA

== Theater ==
Year	Title	Role	Notes	Direction	Theater
2017	Justo en lo mejor de mi vida	Yanina	Co-star	Luis Brandoni	Teatro Picadilly
2019	Perfectos desconocidos	Hija de Rocco y Eva	Voice-over	Guillermo Francella	Centro Cultural Casa España

== Radio ==
Year	Title	Role	Radio
2015	De girafa	broadcaster	RadioyPunto
2023	Antes que nadie	broadcaster	LuzuTV
