= Quiero vivir a tu lado =

Argentinian telecomedy

- Genre: Telenovela
- Created by: Adrián Suar
- Written by: Leandro Calderone; Carolina Aguirre
- Directed by: Daniel Barone
- Starring: Mike Amigorena; Paola Krum; Florencia Peña; Alberto Ajaka; Julián Serrano; Malena Narvay
- Theme music composer: Miranda!
- Opening theme: Quiero vivir a tu lado
- Country of origin: Argentina
- Original language: Spanish
- No. of seasons: 1

Production
- Producer: Pol-ka

Original release
- Network: El Trece
- Release: 23 January – 26 May 2017

Related
- Los ricos no piden permiso; Las Estrellas

Quiero vivir a tu lado (Spanish: I want to live by your side) is a 2017 Argentine comedy, aired by El Trece.

== Plot ==
The series is starred by two neighbor families, the Justo and the Romano. Tomás Justo is a former tennis player, with a conflictive relation with his father, and his wife Natalia suffers from problem gambling. Alfredo Romano is a compulsive player of video games, and his wife Verónica suffers a midlife crisis. Wrongly thinking that she was dying, because of a medical error, Verónica reveals to Tomás that she had always loved him in secret, and that she only married Alfredo to stay close to him.

== Production ==
The series started to be filmed both in location shootings and studio shootings, at the same time. The location shootings worked at Victoria, Pilar, Ezeiza and San Fernando. Studio shootings were performed at the Estudios Baires, in Don Torcuato.

== Reception ==
=== Critical reception ===
Silvina Lamazares, from Clarín, praises the tone and the acting performances of Krum and Peña. She also welcomed that the first kiss between the main characters took place in the first episode, instead of being delayed as in other telenovelas. She also praised that the first episode easily explained all the main characters with the lead characters breaking the fourth wall by looking to the camera and explaining things directly.

== Cast ==
- Mike Amigorena as Tomás Justo
  - Juan Pablo Burgos as young Tomás Justo
- Paola Krum as Verónica Petrucci de Romano
  - Julieta Bartolome as young Verónica Petrucci
- Florencia Peña as Natalia Rouco de Justo
  - Candelaria Molfese as young Natalia Rouco
- Alberto Ajaka as Alfred Romano
  - Rodrigo del Cerro as young Alfred Romano
- Mario Pasik as Eugenio Justo (†)
- Margarita De Luca as Dora Justo
- María Ibarreta as Mamá de Verónica
- Muriel Santa Ana as Marcela Justo
- Carlos Belloso as Aníbal Petrucci
- Alberto Martín as Lorenzo Romano
- Julián Serrano as Pedro Romano Petrucci
- Narella Clausen as Elena Romano Petrucci
- Malena Narvay as Juana Justo Rouco
- Jeremias Batto as Francisco "Pancho" Justo Rouco
- Gabriela Toscano as Susan Cordero
- Jimena Barón as Florencia
- Betiana Blum as Graciela
- Facundo Arana as Víctor Lorenzeti (†)
- Luis Machín as Guillermo del Arco
- Gustavo Guillén as Rolo
- Benjamín Alfonso as Indio Laprida
- Laura Fernández as Fernanda
- Mauricio Dayub as Jaime "Shimmy Valente" Gurevich
- Lizy Tagliani as Silvia Troncoso
- Darío Barassi as Jorge Redondo
- Maida Andrenacci as Irupe
- Camila Peralta as María
- Manuela Viale as Candela
- Demian Bello as Rodrigo Estévez
- Iride Mockert as Josefina "Jelly"
- Máximo Espindola as Matias
- Maximiliano de la Cruz as Javier Damián "Damo" Gómez
- David Masajnik as Médico de Verónica
- Fabián Arenillas as Douglas Fox
- Federico Olivera as El Oso
- Florencia Vigna as Micaela
- Pablo Svidovsky as Pablo Laprida
- Coni Marino as Laura de Laprida
