= Etiqueta Negra (magazine) =

Monthly narrative journalism magazine in Peru

- Editor: Julio Villanueva Chang
- Publisher: Pool Producciones
- Founder: Huberth Jara; Gerson Jara
- First issue: May 2002; 24 years ago
- Country: Peru
- Based in: Lima
- Language: Spanish
- Website: http://www.etiquetanegra.com.pe/

Etiqueta Negra (Spanish for "Black Label") was a monthly Peruvian magazine of narrative journalism style, also published in Panama and Chile.

== History and profile ==
Etiqueta Negra was founded in 2002 by Huberth and Gerson Jara. The magazine counts with the contribution of renowned writers, journalists and artists of Latin America and the world. Each edition of Etiqueta Negra has a theme about which "accomplices" as Etiqueta Negra calls their contributors, submit chronicles, short stories, essays, interviews and investigative reports. The July 2006 issue on fear, according to Foreign Policy, was "a classic of the genre, and included an amusing debate on horror cinema, an article on vampirism, and a beautifully written essay on air travel phobia — all unrelated topics on the surface that effectively coalesced inside the pages of Etiqueta Negra". The magazine is considered to be the most prestigious work of narrative journalism in the Spanish-speaking world and has been compared to The New Yorker. The magazine is headquartered in Lima and is published by Pool Producciones.

From its beginning in 2002, first bimonthly and then monthly, each Etiqueta Negra issue focuses on a main subject (cinema, erotism, fashion, cuisine, etc.) from several perspectives and using a number of techniques: from the photographic chronicle to the essay, from the report to the interview. Julio Villanueva Chang was the first editor-in-chief.

In 2007, Etiqueta Negra co-edited and co-published the Fall 2007 issue of the Virginia Quarterly Review dedicated to South America which was nominated for the National Magazine Award.

In 2011, Etiqueta Negra created a sister magazine, Etiqueta Verde "green label" which is dedicated to covering environmental topics through Etiqueta Negra's signature narrative journalism style. Etiqueta Verde publishes stories, essays artwork and profiles of people working in areas of conservation. According to Etiqueta Negra editor, Elda Cantu, Etiqueta Verde does not advocate for any political position and merely "seeks to raise awareness of the planet's most pressing environmental issues without being militant or sanctimonious". True to its theme, the magazine is printed on eco-friendly paper made from cane sugar.

== Contributors ==
Etiqueta Negra has published texts of writers and journalists such as Mario Vargas Llosa, Juan Villoro, Malcolm Gladwell, Jon Lee Anderson, Carlos Monsiváis, Martín Caparrós, Alberto Barrera Tyszka, Fernando Savater, Joaquín Sabina, Jaime Bayly, Alberto Fuguet, Susan Orlean, Iván Thays and Oliver Sacks, among others.

== Interviews ==
Etiqueta Negra has published original interviews from many notables including Carlos Slim, Gisele Bündchen, José Tomás, Kina Malpartida
