= Lía Crucet =

Argentine actress and singer (1952–2024)

- Born: Delia Crucet; 8 August 1952; Gerli, Buenos Aires, Argentina
- Died: 28 November 2024 (aged 72); Mar del Plata, Buenos Aires, Argentina
- Occupations: Singer; model; actress
- Spouse: Tony Salatino
- Children: 2

Delia Crucet (8 August 1952 – 28 November 2024), professionally known as Lía Crucet, was an Argentine singer, model and actress. She died at the age of 72.
