= Carlos Galettini =

Argentine film director, film producer and screenplay writer

- Born: 1938 (age 87–88); Buenos Aires, Argentina
- Occupations: Film Director; Film producer Screenplay Writer

Carlos Galettini (born 1938) is a Silver Condor nominated Argentine film director, film producer and screenplay writer. He worked mainly in the Cinema of Argentina.

Galettini directed Besos en la Frente in 1996.
