= Seattle International Film Festival =

American annual film festival founded 1976

Seattle International Film Festival (SIFF)

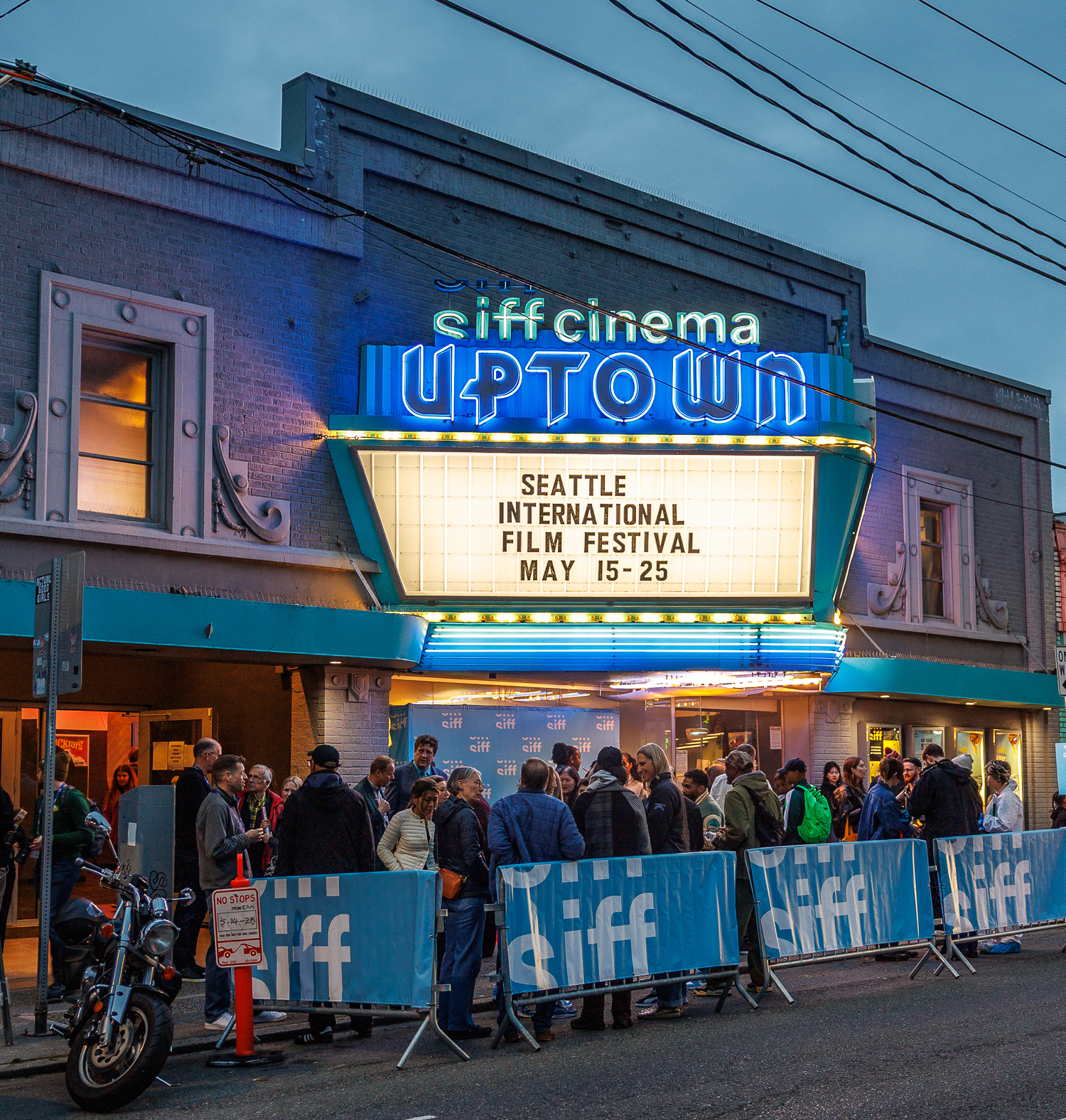
- SIFF Cinema Uptown during the 2025 festival
- Location: Seattle, Washington, U.S.
- Founded: 1976
- Most recent: 2025
- Language: English
- Website: siff.net

The Seattle International Film Festival (SIFF) is an Oscar-qualifying film festival held annually in Seattle, Washington, United States, since 1976. It usually takes place in late May and/or early June. It is one of the largest festivals in the world, and features a diverse assortment of predominantly independent and foreign films, and a strong contingent of documentaries.

SIFF 2006 included more than 300 films and 160,000 attendees; also it was the first SIFF to include a venue in neighboring Bellevue, Washington, after an ill-fated early attempt. However, in 2008, the festival was back to being entirely in Seattle, and had a slight decrease in the number of feature films. The 2010 festival featured over 400 films, shown primarily in downtown Seattle and its nearby neighborhoods, and in Renton, Kirkland, and Juanita Beach Park.

== History ==
The festival began in 1976 at a then-independent cinema, the Moore Egyptian Theater, under the direction of managers Jim Duncan, Dan Ireland, and Darryl Macdonald. The first SIFF featured "Hedda," with Glenda Jackson, Louis Malle's "Black Moon," Luis Buñuel's "Phantom of Liberty." The Rocky Horror Picture Show was the unnamed secret "sneak preview." The Third Festival in 1978 was the first under the direction of Rajeeve Gupta. It doubled the number of films and increased the audience by 50% over the Second festival. The first five festivals were held at The Moore Egyptian. Currently, the Moore Theatre is back under its earlier name and functioning as a concert venue. When founders Dan Ireland and Darryl Macdonald of the Moore Egyptian lost their lease, they founded the Egyptian theater in a former Masonic Temple on Seattle's Capitol Hill. The Egyptian theater remains a prime festival venue to this day, although the festival now typically uses about half a dozen cinemas (including, since 2007, its own SIFF Cinema at Seattle Center), with the exact roster varying from year to year.

During the 1980s, SIFF audiences developed a reputation for appreciating films that did not fit standard industry niches, such as Richard Rush's multi-layered The Stunt Man (1980). SIFF was instrumental in the entry of Dutch films into the United States market, including the first major American debut for director Paul Verhoeven.

== The nature of the festival ==
The festival includes a "Secret Festival". Those who attend the Secret Festival do not know in advance what they will see, and they must sign an oath that they will not reveal afterward what they have seen.

In general, SIFF has a reputation as an "audience festival" rather than an "industry festival". The festival often partially overlaps the Cannes Film Festival, which can reduce attendance by industry bigwigs; in 2007 there were two days of overlap, May 24 and 25.

The SIFF group also curates the Global Lens film series, the Screenwriters Salon, and Futurewave (K-12 programming and youth outreach), coordinates SIFF-A-Go-Go travel programs (organized tours to other film festivals) and co-curates the 1 Reel Film Festival at Bumbershoot and the Sci-Fi Shorts Film Festival at the Science Fiction Museum and Hall of Fame.

In 2006, Longhouse Media launched the SuperFly Filmmaking Experience, in partnership with the Seattle International Film Festival, which brings youth together from diverse backgrounds to work collaboratively on film projects that promote awareness of indigenous issues and mutual understanding of each other's cultures. Fifty youth from across the United States arrive in Seattle to then travel to a local Pacific Northwest reservation to create 4 films in 36 hours.

== SIFF Cinema ==
November 28, 2006, SIFF and Seattle mayor Greg Nickels announced that SIFF would soon have a home and a year-round screening facility in what has been the Nesholm Family Lecture Hall of McCaw Hall, the same building at Seattle Center that houses the Seattle Opera. The city contributed $150,000 to the $350,000 project. This auditorium was a "flagship venue" for SIFF festivals and the site of most press screenings.

Shortly after the 2011 festival, SIFF moved its operations to the SIFF Film Center on the Seattle Center campus. The Film Center includes a 90-seat multi-use theater, multi-media classroom, exhibition spaces, archives, and offices for SIFF and the Film School. In October 2011, SIFF Cinema moved from McCaw Hall to its current location in the Uptown Theater. SIFF utilizes all three of the Uptown's three screens for year-round programming. SIFF currently has year-round programming for four screens in Seattle.

In May 2014 it was announced that SIFF had purchased the Uptown Theater, and would be leasing and renovating the Egyptian Theater (abandoned roughly a year earlier by Landmark Theatres) from Seattle Central College. In May 2023, SIFF announced it had acquired the Seattle Cinerama theater.

== Awards ==
Since 1985, the Seattle International Film Festival has awarded the Golden Space Needle award each year to the festival's most popular movie. Ballots are cast by audience members at the end of each movie. Previous winners of the Golden Space Needle include Whale Rider for 2003, Trainspotting for 1996, Kiss of the Spider Woman for 1985 and Boyhood for 2015, the latter two being the only films to be nominated for the Academy Award for Best Picture and win the Golden Space Needle.

=== Golden Space Needle (Best Film) and SIFF Awards for Best Short and Documentary ===
Year	Best Film (Golden Space Needle)	Best Short	Best Documentary
1985	Kiss of the Spider Woman (dir. Héctor Babenco, Brazil)	Frankenweenie (dir. Tim Burton, United States)	
1986	The Assault (dir. Fons Rademakers, Netherlands)	The Big Snit (dir. Richard Condie, USA)	
1987	My Life as a Dog (dir. Lasse Hallström, Sweden)	Your Face (dir. Bill Plimpton, USA)	
1988	Bagdad Café (dir. Percy Adlon, West Germany)	Ray's Male Heterosexual Dance Hall (dir. Bryan Gordon, USA)	
1989	Apartment Zero (dir. Martin Donovan, USA)	Tin Toy (dir. John Lasseter, USA)	
1990	Pump Up the Volume (dir. Allan Moyle, USA)	Knick Knack (dir. John Lasseter, USA)	
1991	My Mother's Castle (dir. Yves Robert, France)	The Potato Hunter (dir. Timothy Hittle, USA)	Paris Is Burning (dir. Jennie Livingston, USA)
1992	IP5: L'île aux pachydermes (dir. Jean-Jacques Beineix, France)	Anima Mundi (dir. Godfrey Reggio, USA)	A Brief History of Time (dir. Errol Morris, USA)
1993	The Wedding Banquet (dir. Ang Lee, Taiwan/USA)	The Fairy Who Didn't Want to Be a Fairy Anymore (dir. Laurie Lynd, Canada)	Road Scholar (dir. Roger Weisberg, USA)
1994	Priscilla, Queen of the Desert (dir. Stephan Elliott, Australia)	The Wrong Trousers (dir. Nick Park, UK)	The Wonderful, Horrible Life of Leni Riefenstahl (dir. Ray Müller, Germany)
1995	The Kingdom (dir. Lars von Trier, Denmark)	Surprise! (dir. Veit Helmer, Germany)	Crumb (dir. Terry Zwigoff, USA)
1996	Trainspotting (dir. Danny Boyle, UK)	That Night (dir. John Keister, USA)	Hype! (dir. Doug Pray, USA)
1997	Comrades: Almost a Love Story (dir. Peter Chan, Hong Kong)	Ballad of the Skeletons (dir. Gus Van Sant, USA)	Licensed to Kill (dir. Arthur Dong, USA)
1998	God Said Ha! (dir. Julia Sweeney, USA)	Sin Sostén (dir. Rene Castinello, Antonio Urrutia, Belgium)	Frank Lloyd Wright (dir. Ken Burns, Lynn Novick, USA)
1999	Run Lola Run (dir. Tom Tykwer, Germany)	12 Stops of the Road to Nowhere (dir. Jay Lowi, USA)	Buena Vista Social Club (dir. Wim Wenders, USA)
2000	Shower (Zhang Yang, China)	In God We Trust (dir. Jason Reitman, USA)	Trade Off (dir. Shaya Mercer, USA)
2001	Finder's Fee (dir. Jeff Probst, USA)	Boychick (dir. Glenn Gaylord, USA)	The Endurance: Shackleton's Legendary Antarctic Expedition (dir. George Butler, USA)
2002	Elling (dir. Petter Næss, Norway)	The Host (dir. Nicholas Tomnay, Australia)	Ruthie & Connie: Every Room in the House (dir. Deborah Dickson, USA)
2003	Whale Rider (dir. Niki Caro, New Zealand)	Misdemeanor (dir. Jonathan LeMond, USA)	The Revolution Will Not Be Televised (dir. Kim Bartley, Donnacha O'Briain, Ireland, Venezuela)
2004	Facing Windows (dir. Ferzan Özpetek, Italy)	Consent (dir. Jason Reitman, USA)	Born into Brothels (dir. Zana Briski, Ross Kauffman, USA)
2005	Innocent Voices (dir. Luis Mandoki, Mexico)	The Raftman's Razor (dir. Keith Bearden, USA)	Murderball (dir. Henry-Alex Rubin, Dana Adam Shapiro, USA)
2006	OSS 117: Nest of Spies (dir. Michel Hazanavicius, France)	Full Disclosure (dir. Douglas Horn, USA)	The Trials of Darryl Hunt (dir. Ricki Stern, Annie Sundberg, USA)
2007	Outsourced (dir. John Jeffcoat, USA)	Pierre (dir. Dan Brown, USA)	For the Bible Tells Me So (dir. Daniel G. Karslake, USA)
2008	Cherry Blossoms (dir. Doris Dörrie, Germany)	Felix (dir. Andreas Utta, Germany)	The Wrecking Crew (dir. Denny Tedesco, USA)
2009	Black Dynamite (dir. Scott Sanders, USA)	Wallace and Gromit: A Matter of Loaf and Death (dir. Nick Park, UK)	The Cove (dir. Louie Psihoyos, USA)
2010	The Hedgehog (dir. Mona Achache, France)	Ormie (dir. Rob Silvestri, Canada)	Ginny Ruffner: A Not So Still Life (dir. Karen Stanton, USA); Waste Land (dir. Lucy Walker, United Kingdom)
2011	Pájaros de papel (dir. Emilio Aragón, Spain)	The Fantastic Flying Books of Mr. Morris Lessmore (dir. William Joyce and Brandon Oldenburg, USA)	To Be Heard (dir. Amy Sultan, Roland Legiardi-Laura, Edwin Martinez and Deborah Shaffer, USA)
2012	Any Day Now (dir. Travis Fine, USA)	CatCam (dir. Seth Keal, USA)	The Invisible War (dir. Kirby Dick, USA)
2013	Fanie Fourie's Lobola (dir. Henk Pretorius, South Africa)	Spooners (dir. Bryan Horch, USA)	Twenty Feet from Stardom (dir. Morgan Neville, USA)
2014	Boyhood (dir. Richard Linklater, USA)	Fool's Day (dir. Cody Blue Snider, USA)	Keep on Keepin' On (dir. Alan Hicks, USA)
2015	The Dark Horse (dir. James Napier Robertson, New Zealand)	Even the Walls (dir. Sarah Kuck, Saman Maydani, USA)	Romeo Is Bleeding (dir. Jason Zeldes, USA)
2016	Captain Fantastic (dir. Matt Ross, USA)	Alive & Kicking: The Soccer Grannies of South Africa (dir. Lara-Ann de Wet, USA, South Africa)	Gleason (dir. Clay Tweel, USA)
2017	At the End of the Tunnel (dir. Rodrigo Grande, Spain/Argentina)	Defend the Sacred (dir. Kyle Bell, USA)	Dolores (dir. Peter Bratt, USA)
2018	Eighth Grade (dir. Bo Burnham, USA)	Emergency (dir. Carey Williams, USA)	Won't You Be My Neighbor? (dir. Morgan Neville, USA)
2019	Tel Aviv on Fire (dir. Sameh Zoabi, Israel)	Stepdaddy (dir. Lisa Steen, USA)	We are the Radical Monarchs (dir. Linda Goldstein Knowlton, USA)
2020	Not awarded -- Festival cancelled due to COVID-19 pandemic		
2021	There Is No Evil (dir. Mohammad Rasoulof, Germany/Czech Republic/ Iran)	My Neighbor, Miguel (dir. Danny Navarro, USA)	Who We Are: A Chronicle of Racism in America (dir. Sarah Kunstler, Emily Kunstler, USA)
2022	Know Your Place (dir. Zia Mohajerjasbi, USA)	Long Line of Ladies (dir. Reyka Zehtabchi, Shaandiin Tome, USA)	The Territory (dir. Alex Pritz, Brazil, Denmark, USA)
2023	Dancing Queen (dir. Aurora Gossé, Norway)	Donkey (dir. Matt Kazman, USA)	26.2 to Life (dir. Christine Yoo, USA)
2024	Sing Sing (dir. Greg Kwedar, USA)	Jellyfish and Lobster (dir. Yasmin Afifi, United Kingdom)	Porcelain War (dir. Brendan Bellomo, Slava Leontyev, Ukraine, USA, Australia)
2025	Tinā (dir. Miki Magasiva, New Zealand)	Five Star (dir. Kai Hasson, USA)	Come See Me in the Good Light (dir. Ryan White, USA)
2026	Edie Arnold is a Loser (dir. Megan Rico, Kade Atwood, USA)	The Gnawer of Rocks (dir. Louise Flaherty, Canada)	The Life We Leave (dir. JJ Gerber, USA)

=== SIFF Awards for Best Director and Performances ===
Year	Best Director	Best Actress	Best Actor
1985	Krzysztof Zanussi (Power of Evil, Poland)	Renee Soutendijk (The Fourth Man, Belgium)	William Hurt (Kiss of the Spider Woman, Brazil)
1986	Fons Rademakers (The Assault, Netherlands)	Cathy Tyson (Mona Lisa, UK)	Bob Hoskins (Mona Lisa, UK)
1987	Lasse Hallström (My Life as a Dog, Sweden)	Monique van de Ven (Iris, Netherlands)	Gary Oldman (Prick Up Your Ears, UK)
1988	Alan Rudolph (The Moderns, USA)	Deborra-Lee Furness (Shame, Australia)	Tom Hulce (Dominick and Eugene, USA)
1989	Martin Donovan (Apartment Zero, USA)	Wendy Hughes (Boundaries of the Heart, Australia)	Rutger Hauer (The Legend of the Holy Drinker, Italy)
1990	Denys Arcand (Jesus of Montreal, Canada)	Rebecca Jenkins (Bye Bye Blues, Canada)	Michael Rooker (Henry: Portrait of a Serial Killer, USA)
1991	Peter Greenaway (Drowning by Numbers, UK)	Lily Tomlin (Search for Signs of Intelligent Life in the Universe, USA)	Alan Rickman (Close My Eyes and Truly, Madly, Deeply, UK)
1992	Jean-Jacques Beineix (Betty Blue, France)	Marianne Sägebrecht (Martha and I, Germany/France)	Dermot Mulroney (Where the Day Takes You and Samantha, USA)
1993	Ang Lee (The Wedding Banquet, Taiwan/USA)	Tilda Swinton (Orlando, UK/Russia/Italy/France/Netherlands)	Russell Crowe (Romper Stomper and Hammers Over the Anvil, Australia)
1994	Rolf de Heer (Bad Boy Bubby, Australia)	Mimi Rogers (Reflection on a Crime, USA)	Terence Stamp (Priscilla, Queen of the Desert, Australia)
1995	Bryan Singer (The Usual Suspects, USA)	Nicole Kidman (To Die For, USA)	Kevin Spacey (The Usual Suspects, USA)
1996	Danny Boyle (Trainspotting, UK)	Lili Taylor (Girls Town, USA)	Vincent D'Onofrio (The Whole Wide World, USA)
1997	Peter Greenaway (The Pillow Book, UK)	Robin Wright Penn (Loved, USA)	Brendan Fraser (Still Breathing, USA)
1998	Bill Condon (Gods and Monsters, USA)	Christina Ricci (Buffalo 66 and The Opposite of Sex, USA)	Stephen Fry (Wilde, UK)
1999	John Sayles (Limbo, USA)	Piper Laurie (The Mao Game, USA)	Rupert Everett (An Ideal Husband, UK)
2000	Zhang Yang (Shower, China)	Nathalie Baye (Venus Beauty Institute, France)	Dan Futterman (Urbania, USA)
2001	Tim Blake Nelson (O, USA)	Thora Birch (Ghost World, USA)	John Cameron Mitchell (Hedwig and the Angry Inch, USA)
2002	Julio Médem (Sex and Lucia, Spain)	Isabelle Huppert (The Piano Teacher, Austria/France)	Moritz Bleibtreu (Das Experiment, Germany)
2003	Niki Caro (Whale Rider, New Zealand)	Moon So-ri (Oasis, South Korea)	Sul Kyung-gu (Oasis, South Korea)
2004	Marco Tullio Giordana (The Best of Youth, Italy)	Catalina Sandino Moreno (Maria Full of Grace (Colombia/USA)	Luis Tosar (Take My Eyes, Spain)
2005	Gregg Araki (Mysterious Skin, USA)	Joan Allen (Yes, USA)	Joseph Gordon-Levitt (Mysterious Skin, USA)
2006	Goran Dukic (Wristcutters: A Love Story, USA)	Fiona Gordon (The Iceberg, Belgium)	Ryan Gosling (Half Nelson, USA)
2007	Daniel Waters (Sex & Death 101, USA)	Marion Cotillard (La Vie en Rose, France)	Daniel Brühl (Salvador, Spain)
2008	Amin Matalqa (Captain Abu Raed, Jordan)	Jessica Chastain (Jolene, USA)	Alan Rickman (Bottle Shock, USA)
2009	Kathryn Bigelow (The Hurt Locker, USA)	Yolande Moreau (Seraphine), France)	Sam Rockwell (Moon, UK)
2010	Debra Granik (Winter's Bone, USA)	Jennifer Lawrence (Winter's Bone, USA)	Luis Tosar (Cell 211, Spain)
2011	Larysa Kondracki (The Whistleblower, Canada/Germany)	Natasha Petrovic (As If I Am Not There, Ireland)	Bill Skarsgård (Simple Simon, Sweden)
2013	Nabil Ayouch (Horses of God, Morocco)	Samantha Morton (Decoding Annie Parker), USA)	James Cromwell (Still Mine, Canada)
2014	Richard Linklater (Boyhood, USA)	Patricia Arquette (Boyhood, USA)	Dawid Ogrodnik (Life Feels Good, Poland)
2015	Alfonso Gomez-Rejon (Me and Earl and the Dying Girl, USA)	Nina Hoss (Phoenix, Germany)	Cliff Curtis (The Dark Horse, New Zealand)
2016	Javier Ruiz Caldera (Anacleto: agente secreto, Spain)	Vicky Hernández (Between Sea and Land, Colombia)	Rolf Lassgård (A Man Called Ove, Sweden)
2017	Rodrigo Grande (At the End of the Tunnel, Spain/Argentina)	Lene Cecilia Sparrok (Sami Blood (Sameblod), Sweden/Norway/Denmark)	Dave Johns (I, Daniel Blake, United Kingdom/France/Belgium)
2018	Gustav Möller (The Guilty, Denmark)	Elsie Fisher (Eighth Grade, USA)	Miguel Ángel Solá (The Last Suit, Argentina/Poland/Spain/France/Germany)
2019	Ulaa Salim (Sons of Denmark (Danmarks sønner), Denmark)	Damla Sönmez (Sibel, Turkey)	Julius Weckauf (All About Me (Der Junge muss an die frische Luft), Germany)
2020	Not awarded -- Festival cancelled due to COVID-19 pandemic		
Year	Best Director	Best Performance	Lena Sharpe Award For Persistence Of Vision
2023	Maryam Touzani, (The Blue Caftan), Morocco/France	Lubna Azabal, (The Blue Caftan), Morocco/France	26.2 to Life (dir. Christine Yoo, USA)

=== Jury awards ===
Year	New Director Award	New American Cinema Award	Best Documentary
2007	Erik Richter Strand (Sons, Norway)	Shotgun Stories (Jeff Nichols, USA)	Harald Freidl, (Out of Time, Austria)

Year	Short film awards - Narrative short	Short film awards - Animated short	Short film awards - Documentary short
2007	Wigald, Timon Modersohn (Germany)	Everything Will Be OK, Don Hertzfeldt (USA)	Chocolate Country, Robin Blotnick (Dominican Republic / USA)

== Premieres ==
Among the films that have received North American or world premieres at SIFF are:

- Alien – Ridley Scott (1979, World premiere)
- Arafat, My Brother – Rashid Masharawi (2005, North American premiere)
- Banlieue 13 – Pierre Morel (2005, North American premiere)
- Burning in the Wind – Silvio Soldoni (2003, World premiere)
- Cafe Society – Woody Allen (2016, North American premiere)
- Creature – Parris Patton (1999, World premiere)
- Ghost World – Terry Zwigoff (2001, World premiere)
- I Murder Seriously – Antonio Urrutia (2003, North American premiere)
- Joshua Tree, 1951: A Portrait of James Dean – Matthew Mishory (2012, World Premiere)
- Last Days – Gus Van Sant (2005, North American premiere)
- Mars – Anna Melikian (2005, North American premiere)
- Mongolian Ping Pong – Ning Hao (2005, North American premiere)
- Monster House – Gil Kenan (2006, North American premiere)
- Nate Dogg – Thomas Farone (2003, World premiere)
- PTU – Johnny To (2003, North American premiere)
- Time Trap – Mark Dennis & Ben Foster (2017, World Premiere)
- Tomorrow's Weather – Jerzy Stuhr (2003, North American premiere)
- Twice in a Lifetime (1985, world premiere)

== Gala Event films ==
=== Seattle ===
Year	Opening Night	Other Galas	Closing Night
1991	The Miracle (dir. Neil Jordan, UK)		Uranus (dir. Claude Berri, France)
1992	Le Bal des casse-pieds (dir. Yves Robert, France)		Equinox (dir. Alan Rudolph, USA)
1993	Much Ado About Nothing (dir. Kenneth Branagh, USA)		King of the Hill (dir. Steven Soderbergh, USA),
1994	Little Buddha (dir. Bernardo Bertolucci, UK)		Barcelona (dir. Whit Stillman, USA)
1995	Braveheart (dir. Mel Gibson, USA)		Cold Comfort Farm (dir. John Schlesinger, UK)
1996	The Whole Wide World (dir. Dan Ireland, USA)		Emma (dir. Douglas McGrath, USA)
1997	Addicted to Love (dir. Griffin Dunne, USA) Addicted to Love		Mrs. Brown (dir. John Madden, UK)
1998	Firelight (dir. William Nicholson, USA)	Smoke Signals (dir. Chris Eyre, USA)	This Is My Father (dir. Paul Quinn, USA)
1999	The Dinner Game (dir. Francis Veber, France)		Austin Powers: The Spy Who Shagged Me (dir. Jay Roach, USA)
2000	Love's Labour's Lost (dir. Kenneth Branagh, UK)		A Rumor of Angels (dir. Peter O'Fallon, USA)
2001	The Anniversary Party (dir. Jennifer Jason Leigh and Alan Cumming, USA)	O (dir. Tim Blake Nelson, USA) Liam (dir. Stephen Frears, UK); Tortilla Soup (dir. Maria Ripoll, USA); Ghost World (dir. Terry Zwigoff, USA)	Investigating Sex (dir. Alan Rudolph, USA)
2002	Igby Goes Down (dir. Burr Steers, USA)	24 Hour Party People (dir. Michael Winterbottom, UK)	Passionada (dir. Dan Ireland, USA)
2003	Valentín (dir. Alejandro Agresti, Argentina)	H (dir. Lee Jong-hyuk, South Korea) Caesar (dir. Uli Edel, USA); PTU (dir. Johnnie To, Hong Kong); Together (dir. Chen Kaige, South Korea); Whale Rider (dir. Niki Caro, New Zealand)	Jet Lag (dir. Daniele Thompson, France)
2004	The Notebook (dir. Nick Cassavetes, USA)	Saved! (dir. Brian Dannelly, USA) Donnie Darko: The Director's Cut (dir. Richard Kelly, USA); Before Sunset (dir. Richard Linklater, USA); Criminal (dir. Gregory Jacobs, USA)	Intimate Strangers (dir. Patrice Leconte, France)
2005	Me and You and Everyone We Know (dir. Miranda July, USA)	The Dying Gaul (dir. Craig Lucas, USA) Red Dust (dir. Tom Hooper, UK); Bombón, el Perro (dir. Carlos Sorín, Argentina); Côte d'Azur (dir. Olivier Ducastel and Jacques Martineau, France)	Last Days (dir. Gus Van Sant, USA)
2006	The Illusionist (dir. Neil Burger, USA)	Factotum (dir. Bent Hamer, USA) Perhaps Love (dir. Peter Ho-Sun Chan, Hong Kong); A Prairie Home Companion (dir. Robert Altman, USA); Strangers with Candy (dir. Paul Dinello, USA)	The Science of Sleep (dir. Michel Gondry, France)
2007	Son of Rambow (dir. Garth Jennings, USA)	2 Days in Paris, (dir. Julie Delpy, France) A Battle of Wits, (dir. Jacob Cheung, Hong Kong); The Boss of It All, (dir. Lars von Trier, Denmark); Evening, (dir. Lajos Koltai, USA)	Molière (dir. Laurent Tirard, France)
2008	Battle in Seattle (dir. Stuart Townsend, USA)	The Great Buck Howard (dir. Sean McGinly, USA)	Bottle Shock (dir. Randall Miller, USA)
2009	In the Loop (dir. Armando Iannucci, UK)	Humpday (dir. Lynn Shelton, USA)	OSS 117: Lost in Rio (dir. Michel Hazanavicius, France)
2010	The Extra Man (dir. Shari Springer Berman and Robert Pulcini, USA)	Farewell (dir. Christian Carion, France)	Get Low (dir. Aaron Schneider, USA)
2011	The First Grader (dir. Justin Chadwick, UK)	Service Entrance (dir. Philippe Le Guay, France)	Life in a Day (dir. Kevin MacDonald, UK)
2012	Your Sister's Sister (dir. Lynn Shelton, USA)	The Chef (dir. Daniel Cohen (filmmaker), France)	Grassroots (dir. Stephen Gyllenhaal, USA)
2013	Much Ado About Nothing (dir. Joss Whedon, USA)	20 Feet from Stardom (dir. Morgan Neville, USA)	The Bling Ring (dir. Sofia Coppola, USA)
2014	Jimi: All Is By My Side (dir. John Ridley, USA)	Boyhood (dir. Richard Linklater, USA)	The One I Love (dir. Charlie McDowell, USA)
2015	Spy (dir. Paul Feig, USA)	The End of the Tour (dir. James Ponsoldt, USA)	The Overnight (dir. Patrick Brice, USA)
2016	Café Society (dir. Woody Allen, USA)	Gleason (dir. Clay Tweel, USA)	The Dressmaker (dir. Jocelyn Moorhouse, Australia)
2017	The Big Sick (dir. Michael Showalter, USA)	Landline (dir. Gillian Robespierre, USA)	The Young Karl Marx (Le jeune Karl Marx) (dir. Raoul Peck, France/Germany/Belgium)
2018	The Bookshop (dir. Isabel Coixet, Spain)	Sorry to Bother You (dir. Boots Riley, USA)	Don't Worry, He Won't Get Far on Foot (dir. Gus Van Sant, USA)
2019	Sword of Trust (dir. Lynn Shelton, USA)	Late Night (dir. Nisha Ganatra, USA)	The Farewell (dir. Lulu Wang, USA)
2021	The Dry (dir. Robert Connelly, Australia)		Rosa's Wedding (dir. Icíar Bollaín, Spain/France)
2022	Navalny (dir. Daniel Roher, USA)		Call Jane (dir. Phyliss Nagy, USA)
2023	Past Lives (dir. Celine Song, USA)		I Like Movies (dir. Chandler Levack, Canada)
2024	Thelma (dir. Josh Margolin, USA)		Sing Sing (dir. Greg Kwedar, USA)
2025	Four Mothers (dir. Darren Thornton, Ireland)		Sorry, Baby (dir. Eva Victor, USA)

=== Kirkland ===
Year	Opening Night
2010	The Over the Hill Band (dir. Geoffrey Enthoven, Belgium)
2011	Bon Appétit (dir. David Pinillos, Spain)
2012	Starbuck (dir. Ken Scott, Canada)
2013	Papadopoulos & Sons (dir. Marcus Markou, UK)
2014	The Grand Seduction (dir. Don McKellar, Canada)
2015	Good Ol' Boy (dir. Frank Lotito, USA)
2016	Paul à Québec (dir. François Bouvier, Canada)
2017	Footnotes (Sur quel pied danser) (dir. Kostia Testut, Paul Calori, France)
2018	The Drummer and the Keeper (dir. Nick Kelly, Ireland)
2019	Non-Fiction (Doubles vies) (dir. Olivier Assayas, France)

=== Renton ===
Year	Opening Night
2011	Redemption Road (original title: Black White and Blues) (dir. Mario Van Peebles, USA)
2012	Fat Kid Rules the World (dir. Matthew Lillard, USA)
2013	Touchy Feely (dir. Lynn Shelton, USA)
2014	Lucky Them (dir. Megan Griffiths, USA)
2015	The Second Mother (dir. Anna Muylaert, Brazil)
2016	My Blind Brother (dir. Sophie Goodhart, USA)

== See also ==
- List of film awards
