= Ulises Dumont =

Argentine actor (1937–2008)

- Born: April 7, 1937; Buenos Aires, Argentina
- Died: November 29, 2008 (aged 71); Buenos Aires

Ulises Dumont (April 7, 1937 – November 29, 2008) was a prolific Argentine film actor, credited with over 80 appearances in film and countless others in theatre and television from 1964 until his death in 2008.

== Life and work ==
Born in 1937 in Buenos Aires, Dumont first worked in Bunge y Born, Argentina's largest grain wholesaler and one of the principal grain conglomerates in the World. Later that year (1956), he made his first appearance on the stage, developing an affinity for the art that, for economic reasons, he postponed pursuing for several more years. After a modest career in sales, Dumont was given his first film role, a bit part in a 1964 comedy. The otherwise forgettable experience opened doors for him in Buenos Aires' vibrant theatre scene, and he returned to film only in 1971. Eschewing classical theatre, he contributed mostly to locally-written productions, soon becoming a fixture in works by noted Argentine dramatists such as Villanueva Cosse, Carlos Gorostiza and Griselda Gambaro. Receiving his first starring film role in Sergio Renán's 1976 film adaptation of an Haroldo Conti play, Crecer de golpe ("Maturing Suddenly") secured Dumont's reputation in Argentine drama. He was offered numerous leading theatre roles in 1977, the most memorable of which were probably Carlos Gorostiza's El puente ("The Bridge") and what would become his signature role, that of a crusty, ravenous Italian-Argentine grandmother in Roberto Cossa's La nona.

The following year, Dumont lent his talent to a young, hitherto unknown Argentine director, Adolfo Aristarain. The 1978 thriller, La Parte del león ("The Lion's Share") began a successful string of similar collaborations between the two and an actor already well-established as a leading man since the 1960s, Federico Luppi. The three collaborated similarly in the muck-raking Tiempo de revancha ("Time for Revenge," 1981) and the thriller Últimos días de la víctima ("The Victim's Last Days," 1982). True to Dumont's understated style, the three acclaimed and commercially successful films criticized the prevailing climate of fear (during a regime in which doing so was often perilous) with metaphor and veiled references to current events.

Developing a close friendship with Federico Luppi, he and Dumont co-starred with various other directors over the following years and, in the interim, Dumont married Marcela Luppi, Federico's daughter. The two starred in Hector Olivera's No habrá más penas ni olvido ("Little Dirty War," 1983), a tragic comedy set during the 1974 internal conflict between left and right-wing Peronists; 1983 also saw Dumont star in Eduardo Calcagno's Los Enemigos ("The Enemies"). The dark thriller, released months before Argentina's return to democracy, focused on use that the well-connected had made of their ties to the military during the dictatorship in ridding themselves of enemies, with impunity. Working prolifically following the advent of democracy, Dumont played, among others, an opinionated hobo in Lautaro Murúa's Cuarteles de invierno ("Winter Barracks," 1984) and a no-nonsense producer faced with an unpredictable film maker in La película del rey ("A King and His Movie," 1985), a title which has enjoyed international exposure since its VHS release the following year. His role in "Winter Barracks" remained, by his own admission, his favorite. He was reunited with Luppi in 1987, cast in a supporting role in El Año del conejo ("The Year of the Rabbit") a divorce comedy made during Luppi's own contentious separation from wife and former co-star Haydée Padilla.

During an era in which Argentine cinema often revisited the traumas lived during the 1976–83 dictatorship, Dumont was cast in a leading role as an aging, targeted intellectual in Fernando Solanas' Sur ("South," 1987), one of the defining films on the subject. Working in varied genres, he also starred in a crime caper, Juan Carlos Desanzo's Al filo de la ley ("On the Edge of the Law," 1992) and was reunited with director Eduardo Calcagno in El Censor ("The Censor," 1995), a surreal historical drama loosely based on Miguel Paulino Tato's notorious tenure as National Film Rater (censor) during the 1970s.

Turning to more sentimental work in his later years, Dumont traveled to Cuba to play an aging businessman in the throes of hopelessness in Diego Musiak's Historias clandestinas en la Habana ("Hidden Stories in Havana," 1996). Continuing to be active in the theatre, he performed in the title role of an alienated professor in Roberto Cossa's Yepeto ("Gepetto"), a play that enjoyed an approximately 5,000-performance run during the 1990s. Yepeto was adapted for the screen by director Eduardo Calcagno in 1999. A heavy smoker, Dumont suffered from worsening cardiovascular health subsequently and, yet, his work in film remained as vigorous as ever, playing a socially conscious priest in Cerca de la frontera ("Near the Border," 1999), an ex convict in a bind in Rosarigasinos ("Rosario Boys," 2001), a widower lost without his better half in La esperanza ("Hope," 2003), an elderly woman's inopportune lover in Conversaciones con mamá (2004), and a railroad worker laid off by the sector's mass 1992 privatizations in Próxima salida ("Next Stop," 2004), to name only a few of his recent film, theatre and television roles. Dumont earned three Silver Condor Awards and three awards at the Havana Film Festival, among numerous other recognitions.

A victim of heart disease, Dumont died in a Buenos Aires clinic at the age of 71. Dumont's remains were buried in Chacarita Cemetery.
