= Últimos días de la víctima =

Últimos días de la víctima may refer to:

- Últimos días de la víctima (novel), a 1979 Argentine novel
- Últimos días de la víctima (film), a 1982 film adaptation of the novel
