= Two to Tango =

- Film poster
- Directed by: Héctor Olivera
- Written by: Yolande Turner; José Pablo Feinmann; Beverly Gray (additional dialogue)
- Based on: Last Days of the Victim by José Pablo Feinmann
- Produced by: Roger Corman; Alejandro Sessa
- Starring: Don Stroud; Adrianne Sachs; Duilio Marzio; Michael Cavanaugh; Alberto Segado
- Cinematography: Leonardo Rodríguez Solís
- Edited by: Eduardo López
- Music by: Óscar Cardozo Ocampo
- Production companies: Aries Cinematográfica Argentina; New Horizons Picture
- Distributed by: Aries Cinematográfica Argentina; Concorde Pictures
- Release date: 1 February 1989
- Running time: 87 minutes
- Countries: Argentina; United States
- Languages: English; Spanish

Two to Tango, also known as Matar es morir un poco (English: "To Kill is To Die a Little"), is a 1989 American-Argentine suspense film directed by Héctor Olivera and based on the novel Last Days of the Victim by José Pablo Feinmann, who also co-wrote the screenplay. It was one in a number of ten movies Roger Corman produced in Argentina during the 1980s.

== Plot ==
A hitman who wishes to leave his line of work is tasked by his agency with killing one final target in Buenos Aires, but the situation becomes complicated when he falls in love with his target's lover and asks her to flee to Nepal with him.

== Cast ==
- Don Stroud ... James Conrad
- Adrianne Sachs ... Cecilia Lorca
- Duilio Marzio ... Paulino Velasco
- Michael Cavanaugh ... Dean Boyle
- Alberto Segado ... Lorenzo 'Lucky' Lara
- Francisco Cocuzza ... Carlos Pino
- Golde Flami ... Hilda Levin
- Nathán Pinzón ... Morelos
- Juan José Ghisalberti ... Joseph Levin
- Ricardo Hamlin ... Bates
- Jose Luis Cabrera ... Tango Dancer
- Pablo Novak ... Sergio
- Adriana Salonia ... Adela
- Ana Maria Vita ... Boarder 1 at Levin's Hotel
- Alejandra De Luiggi ... Boarder 2 at Levin's Hotel
- Flávia Aberg Cobo ... Airline Attendant 1
- Maria Fournery ... Airline Attendant 2
- Armando Capo ... Angelo
- Ricardo Fasan ... Paolo Basso (as Ricardo Fassan)
- Lilian Rinar ... Blonde Woman
- Gianni Fiore ... Customs Employee (as Gianni Fiori)
- Daniel Ripari ... Bodyguard 1
- Arturo Noal ... Bodyguard 2
- Rubén Bermúdez ... Bodyguard 3
- Nestor Cannichio ... Lara's Driver

== Production ==
The film was based on the novel Ultimas dias de la victima, by Argentine screenwriter, philosopher and novelist Jose Pablo Feinmann. The book was adapted as a movie for the first time in the Argentinian film Últimos días de la víctima (1982).

The story was totally rewritten by a U.S. screenwriter, Yolanda Finch (Yolande Turner), together with Feinmann, for a North American audience.

== Reception ==
Variety called it "uneven".
