= The Stranger (1987 film) =

1987 film by Adolfo Aristarain

- Directed by: Adolfo Aristarain
- Written by: Dan Gurskis
- Produced by: Jorge Gundín; Hugo Lamonica
- Starring: Bonnie Bedelia; Peter Riegert; Barry Primus; David Spielberg; Ricardo Darín; Cecilia Roth
- Cinematography: Horacio Maira
- Edited by: Eduardo López
- Music by: Craig Safan
- Production companies: Michael Nolin; Tusitalia
- Distributed by: Columbia Pictures
- Release date: December 4, 1987
- Running time: 93 minutes
- Countries: Argentina; United States
- Language: English

The Stranger is a 1987 Argentine-American thriller film directed by Adolfo Aristarain and starring Bonnie Bedelia, Peter Riegert, Barry Primus, Ricardo Darín and Cecilia Roth. It was written by Dan Gurskis. It was released in the United States on December 4, 1987.

== Plot ==
A woman living in Buenos Aires (Bedelia), who is suffering from amnesia, discovers that she is the sole surviving witness to a brutal murder. Although the police can find no clues about any murder, the killers begin to hunt her.

== Cast ==
- Bonnie Bedelia ... Alice Kildee
- Peter Riegert ... Dr. Harris Kite
- Barry Primus ... Sergeant Drake
- David Spielberg ... Hobby
- Ricardo Darín ... Clark Whistler
- Cecilia Roth ... Anita
- Julio de Grazia ... Jay
- Marcos Woinsky ... Macaw
- Jacques Arndt ... Rhea
- Milton James ... Brandt
- Julio Kaufman ... Dr. Hobby
- Ernesto Larrese ... Lark
- Sacha Favelevic ... Robin
- Federico Luppi ... Manager
- Miguel Ángel Paludi ... Croupier
- Patricia Zangaro ... Female police officer
- Adrián Ghio ... White intruder
- Melvin Daniel ... Black man
- Arturo Maly ... Father
- Lala Sunblad ... Mother
- Nicolas Deane ... Teenage son
- Marina Magali ... Actress
- Tito Mendoza ... Hobo
- Haydée Padilla ... Desk woman
- Heidi Froseth ... Fat woman
- Sofía Viruboff ... Desk girl (as Sofia Virobof)
- Adolfo Aristarain ... Movie goer (uncredited)
