= List of Argentine films of 2016 =

This is a list of Argentine films which were released in 2016:

Argentine films of 2016
Title	Director	Release	Genre
A - B
8 tiros	Bruno Hernandez	14 de enero	Thriller/Drama
'87	Anahi Hoeneisen & Daniel Andrade	18 de febrero	Drama
100 años de perdón	Daniel Calparsoro	3 de marzo	Crimen
2001: Mientras Kubrick estaba en el espacio	Gabriel Nicoli	8 de diciembre	Comedia dramática
El abrazo de la serpiente	Ciro Guerra	18 de febrero	Drama
El aire	Santiago Guidi	4 de febrero	Comedia romántica
Al final del túnel	Rodrigo Grande	21 de abril	Suspenso
Alias María	José Luis Rugeles	7 de enero	Drama
Alma	Diego Rougier	16 de junio	Comedia romántica
Amor, etc.	Gladys Lizarazu	19 de noviembre	Drama
Angelita, la doctora	Helen Tritek	28 de abril	Drama
Antonio Puigjané, El Piru	Fabio Zurita	18 de febrero	Documental
Arribeños	Marcos Rodríguez	4 de febrero	Documental
Ataúd blanco	Daniel de la Vega	21 de julio	Terror
El auge del humano	Eduardo Williams	Festival	Drama
Los ausentes	Luciana Piantanida	8 de septiembre	Drama
Bien de familia	María Eugenia Fontana	4 de agosto	Musical
Bronces en Isla Verde	Adriana Yurcovich	7 de enero	Documental
C - D
Caída del cielo	Néstor Sánchez Sotelo	5 de mayo	Comedia dramática
Camino a La Paz	Francisco Varone	7 de enero	Road Movie
Camino de campaña	Nicolás Grosso	25 de febrero	Drama
Campaña antiargentina	Alejandro Parysow & Alejandro Alem	28 de julio	Comedia
Chicas nuevas 24 horas	Mabel Lozano	5 de mayo	Documental
El cielo escondido	Pablo César	18 de agosto	Suspenso
El ciudadano ilustre	Mariano Cohn y Gastón Duprat	8 de septiembre	Comedia dramática
Crespo (La continuidad de la memoria)	Eduardo Crespo	4 de junio	Biográfica
Los cuerpos dóciles	Matías Scarvaci & Diego Gachassin	4 de agosto	Documental
Danzar con María	Ivan Gergolet	21 de abril	Documental
Decime que se siente	Manuel Pifano	18 de agosto	Drama
Las decisiones formales	Melisa Brito Aller	5 de mayo	Drama
Dolores	Juan Dickinson	18 de agosto	Drama romántico
¿Dónde estás, Negro?	Alejandro Maly	4 de agosto	Documental
Dos elefantes	Marco Berger	16 de junio	Drama Romántico
E - H
El encuentro de Guayaquil	Nicolas Capelli	7 de julio	Biopic histórico
El eslabón podrido	Javier Diment	16 de junio	Terror
Los exiliados románticos	Jonás Trueba	7 de abril	Comedia Dramática
Exilio de Malvinas	Federico J. Palma	14 de abril	Documental
Expediente Santiso	Brian Maya	18 de febrero	Misterio
Fausto también	Juan Manuel Repetto	31 de marzo	Documental
Finding Sofia	Nico Casavecchia	14 de abril	Comedia
El francesito: Un documental (im)posible sobre Enrique Pichón-Riviere	Miguel Kohan	28 de julio	Documental
El futuro perfecto	Nele Wohlatz	Festival	Drama
Gilda, no me arrepiento de este amor	Lorena Muñoz	15 de septiembre	Musical Biográfica
Grete, la mirada oblicua	Pablo Zubizarreta & Matilde Michanié	28 de abril	Documental
Guaraní	Luis Zorraquín	7 de abril	Drama
La guardería	Virginia Croatto	7 de abril	Documental
G. Un crimen oficial	Daniel Otero	7 de abril	Crimen
La helada negra	Maximiliano Schonfeld	23 de junio	Drama
Hermia & Helena	Matías Piñeiro	Festival	Drama
Hijos nuestros	Juan Fernández Geba & Nicolás Suárez	12 de mayo	Drama
El hilo rojo	Daniela Goggi	19 de mayo	Drama romántico
La historia oficial (re-estreno)	Luis Puenzo	24 de marzo	Drama histórico
Historias breves 12	Diego Fió, Víctor Postiglione, Chiara Ghio, César Sodero, Josefina Recio, Adriana Yurcovich, Martín Rodríguez Redondo & Dolores Montaño	12 de mayo	Documental
I - L
Il solengo	Alessio Rigo de Righi & Matteo Zoppis	26 de mayo	Drama
La ilusión de Noemí	Claudio Remedi	23 de junio	Drama
Las Ineses	Pablo José Meza	13 de octubre	Drama
Los inocentes	Mauricio Brunetti	28 de abril	Terror
Inseparables	Marcos Carnevale	11 de agosto	Comedia Dramática
Internet Junkie	Alexander Katzowicz	17 de marzo	Drama
El invierno	Emiliano Torres	6 de octubre	Drama
Juana a los 12	Martin Shanly	7 de abril	Drama
Justo en lo mejor de mi vida	Leonardo Fabio Calderón	7 de abril	Comedia
Kékszakállú	Gastón Solnicki	Festival	Drama
KM 0 Ficciones urbanas	Mario Levin	2 de junio	Documental
Koblic	Sebastián Borensztein	12 de mayo	Thriller Erótico
Kombit (Hacer algo juntos)	Aníbal Garisto	10 de marzo	Documental
La larga noche de Francisco Sanctis	Francisco Márquez & Andrea Testa	Festival	Drama
El legado estratégico de Juan Perón	Pino solanas	25 de febrero	Documental
El limonero real	Gustavo Fontán		Drama
Las lindas	Melisa Liebenthal	31 de enero	Drama
Lisa	Ernesto Aguilar	11 de febrero	Drama/Fantasía
Llamas de nitrato	Mirko Stopar	14 de enero	Documental
Loca ella, loco yo	Nicolás León Tannchen		Comedia Negra
Lucha, jugando con lo imposible	Ana Quiroga	21 de abril	Documental
Lulú	Luis Ortega	2 de junio	Drama
La luz incidente	Ariel Rotter	1 de septiembre	Drama
M - O
Magallanes	Salvador del Solar	3 de marzo	Drama
Mecánica popular	Alejandro Agresti	10 de marzo	Drama
Me casé con un boludo	Juan Taratuto	17 de marzo	Comedia romántica
El método Tangalanga	Ariel Winograd	4 de agosto	Biográfica
Monumento	Fernando Díaz	4 de agosto	Documental
The Movement (El movimiento)	Benjamín Naishtat	3 de marzo	Drama
El muerto cuenta su historia	Fabián Forte	22 de septiembre	Comedia Terrorífica
Nadie nos mira	Julia Solomonoff		Drama
Neruda	Pablo Larraín	11 de agosto (Chile)	Drama Biográfico
La niña de tacones amarillos	Luján Loioco	31 de marzo	Drama
No estás solo en esto	Milagros Amondaray	10 de marzo	Documental
No me mates	Gabriel Arbós	18 de agosto	Drama Documental
La obra del siglo	Carlos Machado Quintela	2 de agosto	Drama
Onda su onda	Rocco Papaleo	18 de febrero	Comedia
Operación méxico, un Pacto de Amor	Leonardo Bechini	2 de junio	Drama
P - R
Palestinos Go Home	Silvia Maturana; Pablo Navarro Espejo	5 de mayo	Documental
Pantanal	Andrew Sala	25 de febrero	Drama
Parabellum	Lukas Valenta Rinner	10 de marzo	Drama
La pareja perfecta	Damián Szifron	24 de noviembre	Romance
Paternóster, la otra mirada	Daniel Alvaredo	17 de marzo	Terror
Paula	Eugenio Canevari	21 de julio	Drama
Permitidos	Ariel Winograd	4 de agosto	Comedia
Pibe chorro	Andrea Testa	9 de junio	Documental
Poner al rock de moda	Santiago Charriere	19 de mayo	Musical
Pozo de aire	Milagros Mumenthaler	Festival	Drama
Primavera	Santiago Giralt	1 de septiembre	Comedia
Punto ciego	Martín Basterretche	31 de marzo	Drama
Rara	Pepa San Martín	23 de junio	Drama
Resentimental	Leo Damario	24 de noviembre	Comedia Dramática
Resurrección	Gonzalo Calzada	7 de enero	Terror
El retorno de Don Luis	Sebastián Deus	28 de julio	Documental
El rey del Once	Daniel Burman	11 de febrero	Comedia Dramática
S - T
El sable	Nahuel Machesich	2 de junio	Drama Político
Salud rural	Darío Doria	28 de abril	Documental
Sangre en la boca	Hernán Belón	25 de agosto	Drama romántico
Saudade	Juan Carlos Donoso Gómez	18 de febrero	Drama
Soleada	Gabriela Trottel	3 de marzo	Drama
Subte - Polska	Alejandro Magnone	10 de marzo	Drama
Taekwondo	Marco Berger	18 de agosto	Drama
Tiempo de dragones	Pablo Helman	Pospuesto	Fantasía
Tiempo muerto	Víctor Postiglione	28 de abril	Drama
Tierra golpeada	Celeste Helmet	12 de mayo	Drama Político
Tini: El gran cambio de Violetta	Juan Pablo Buscarini	2 de junio	Musical
U - Z
La última fiesta	Nicolás Silbert & Leandro Mark	6 de octubre	Comedia
Una noche de amor	Hernán Guerschuny	25 de febrero	Comedia Romántica
Una novia de Shanghai	Mauro Andrizzi		Drama Romántico
La valija de Benavidez	Laura Casabe	15 de septiembre	Drama
Víctimas de Tangalanga	Diego Recalde	Abril de 2016	Biográfica
La visita	Mauricio López Fernández	3 de marzo	Drama
Zama	Lucrecia Martel	Pospuesto	Drama
