= Dancing Queen (disambiguation) =

"Dancing Queen" is a 1976 single by Swedish pop group ABBA.

"Dancing Queen" may also refer to:

== Music ==
- Dancing Queen (album), 2018 Cher album
- "Dancing Queen", a 2012 single by South Korean girl group Crayon Pop
- "Dancing Queen" (Girls' Generation song), a 2012 single by South Korean girl group Girls' Generation

== Film ==
- Dancing Queen (1993 film), a 1993 British romantic comedy film
- Dancing Queen (2012 film), a 2012 South Korean romantic comedy film
- Dancing Queen (2023 film), a 2023 Norwegian family film

== Television ==
- Dancing Queen (2008 Indian TV series), a 2008–2009 Indian dance reality competition television series
- Dancing Queen (American TV series), 2018 documentary reality television series on Netflix
- Dancing Queen (2020 Indian TV series), 2020 Indian Marathi-language reality television series
- "Dancing Queen" (Legends of Tomorrow), a 2018 episode of Legends of Tomorrow
