= At the End of the Tunnel =

2016 Argentine-Spanish film

- Original title: Al final del túnel
- Directed by: Rodrigo Grande
- Written by: Rodrigo Grande
- Produced by: Mariela Besuievksy; Pablo Echarri; Martín Seefeld; Gerardo Herrero; Vanessa Ragone; Axel Kuschevatzky
- Starring: Leonardo Sbaraglia; Pablo Echarri; Clara Lago
- Cinematography: Félix Monti
- Edited by: Leire Alonso; Manuel Bauer; Irene Blecua
- Music by: Lucio Godoy; Federico Jusid
- Production companies: Tornasol Films; El Árbol; Haddock Films; Hernández y Fernández PC; Mistery Producciones AIE
- Distributed by: Warner Bros. Pictures
- Release dates: 21 April 2016 (Argentina); 12 August 2016 (Spain)
- Running time: 120 minutes
- Countries: Argentina; Spain
- Language: Spanish

At the End of the Tunnel (Spanish: Al final del túnel) is a 2016 Argentine-Spanish crime thriller film written and directed by Rodrigo Grande.

== Cast ==
- Leonardo Sbaraglia as Joaquín
- Pablo Echarri as Javi Galereto
- Clara Lago as Berta
- Uma Salduende as Betty
- Javier Godino as Zurdo
- Federico Luppi as Guttman

== Production ==
The film is an Argentine and Spanish co-production by Tornasol Films, "Árbol Contenidos", Haddock Films, Hernández y Fernández PC, and Mistery Producciones AIE, in association with Telefé and with the participation of TVE. One of the actors, Pablo Echarri, also gave support with his company El Árbol, with this being his first foray as a producer. The director, who was in charge of the script, developed it in the course of five years in the Storyboard format.

All those involved in the production highlighted that, "Except for the two outdoors scenes, everything was recreated in studios: The protagonist's house, the basement where the robbers hide, and even the tunnel to real scale in a construction of fifty meters".

The main female role is played by the Spanish actress Clara Lago, (who was the protagonist of Ocho apellidos vascos and its sequel Ocho apellidos catalanes). Lago's character "Berta", speaks Rioplatense Spanish, which was achieved by the actress in a very short time. Rodrigo Grande explained this: "Clara arrived two weeks before shooting, and had a traditional accent. But two weeks later she was speaking Argentine Spanish. It was amazing ... She had a coach for only four days and then she handled herself".

Félix Monti worked as cinematographer whereas Lucio Godoy and Federico Jusid composed the score.

== Release ==
The film premiered in Argentina on 21 April 2016. Distributed by Warner, it was theatrically released in Spain on 12 August 2016.

== Accolades ==
The film won best movie at the Seattle International Film Festival in 2017.

== See also ==
- List of Argentine films of 2016
- List of Spanish films of 2016
