= Últimos días de la víctima (novel) =

Últimos días de la víctima (English: Last Days of the Victim) is the first novel by Argentine author José Pablo Feinmann. It was published in Spanish in Buenos Aires by Legasa in 1979, 1983 and 1987. It was reprinted there by Seix Barral in 1996 and 2006, and by Planeta in 2015. It was translated into French by Francois Campo-Timal and published in Paris with the title Les Derniers jours de la victime by Albin Michel in 1991 and by Le Livre de Poche (LGF) in 1993. This book is a novela negra, the Spanish term for noir fiction. The plot of the novel follows the contract killer Raúl Mendizábal, who is spying on a mysterious person named Rodolfo Külpe, whom he has been paid to kill.

In 1982, it was adapted into film for the first time in the homonymous Argentine classic Últimos días de la víctima, directed by Adolfo Aristarain. In 1988, it was adapted again for Two to Tango, an Argentine-American coproduction directed by Hector Olivera, with Roger Corman as executive producer. It was also adapted for the French-Cuban TV movie Les derniers jours de la victime (1995), directed by Bruno Gantillon.

== Sources ==
- Amelia S. Simpson. Detective fiction from Latin America. Fairleigh Dickinson University Press. 1990. Pages 39, 54, 60, 61, 139, 141 to 146, 155, 185. Google Books.
- Darrell B. Lockhart (editor). "Jose Pablo Feinman (b 1943)". Latin American Mystery Writers: An A-to-Z Guide. Greenwood Press. 2004. Page 82.
- "La Novela De Feinmann: Una Reflexion Sobre La Violencia" (1981) Crear en la cultura nacional, issues 4–11, p 31; see also passim Google Books
- Ana Maria Zubieta, "La novela negra como fuente" (1983) Revista de la Universidad de México, volume 38 (new series), issue 21, page 43 et seq, Google Books:
- (2004) QueHacer, issues 146–148, page 102
- Giuseppe Petronio, Jorge B Rivera and Luigi Volta. "José Pablo Feinmann". Los héroes "difíciles": la literatura policial en la Argentina y en Italia. Corregidor. 1991. pp. 143–150. See also page 25. Google Books
- (2001) Revista de crítica literaria latinoamericana, issue 54, page 51 Google Books
- (2001) Semiosis, issue 7, page 55 Google Books
