= María Julia Bertotto =

Argentine production and costume designer

- Born: 21 September 1938 (age 87); Buenos Aires, Argentina
- Occupations: Production designer Costume designer

María Julia Bertotto (born 21 September 1938) is an Argentine production and costume designer.

== Life and career ==
Born in Buenos Aires, the daughter of actress María del Río and granddaughter of actress Iris Martorel, Bertotto formed at the Theatre Institute of the University of Buenos Aires (ITUBA). She made her professional debut in 1965 working on stage, for dramas, ballets and operas, and starting from 1967 she also worked in the cinema industry. Her collaborations include Héctor Olivera, Luis García Berlanga, Norma Aleandro, Luis Puenzo, Carlos Gorostiza, Juan José Campanella, Oscar Barney Finn, Ricardo Wullicher. During her career she received numerous awards and honours, including the 2011 Platinum Konex Award and the Konex Merit Diploma for her career, two Silver Condor Awards in 1981 and 1999, and an ACE Award in 1994. She was married from 1988 till his death to the philosopher and writer José Pablo Feinmann.
