= Dora Prince =

Argentine actress (1930–2015)

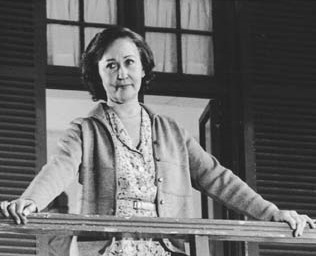
Dora Prince in 1989.

Dora Prince, born María del Pilar Rodríguez, (October 2, 1930 – January 29, 2015) was an Argentine film, stage and television actress.

Prince first began acting on Radio Aconcagua when she was fourteen years old during the mid-1940s. She appeared as a regular cast member on the radio series beginning in 1946. She originally studied acting under Osvaldo Bonet and Antonio Cunill Cabanellas, whom she studied under until 1950, when he joined the cast of "Las dos carátulas: el teatro de la Humanidad" on LRA Radio Nacional.

The majority of Dora Prince's roles were in television. However, she appeared in two major film roles, Fernando Ayala's The Deal (El Arreglo) in 1983 and Cuatro caras para Victoria, which was directed by Oscar Barney Finn and released in 1992.

Dora Prince died of natural causes on January 29, 2015, at the age of 84. She was cremated at Cementerio de la Chacarita.
