= Time for Revenge =

- Spanish language theatrical poster
- French: Tiempo de revancha
- Directed by: Adolfo Aristarain
- Written by: Adolfo Aristarain
- Produced by: Héctor Olivera; Luis O. Repetto
- Starring: Federico Luppi; Haydée Padilla; Julio De Grazia; Ulises Dumont; Aldo Barbero; Enrique Liporace; Arturo Maly; Rodolfo Ranni
- Cinematography: Horacio Maira
- Edited by: Eduardo López
- Music by: Emilio Kauderer
- Production company: Aries Cinematográfica Argentina
- Distributed by: Aries Cinematográfica Argentina; Televicine International
- Release date: 30 July 1981
- Running time: 112 min.
- Country: Argentina
- Language: Spanish

Time for Revenge (Spanish: Tiempo de revancha) is a 1981 Argentine political thriller film written and directed by Adolfo Aristarain and starring Federico Luppi, Julio De Grazia, Haydée Padilla, and Ulises Dumont. It was produced by Héctor Olivera and Luis O. Repetto. The music was composed by Emilio Kauderer. The film premiered in Argentina on July 30, 1981, and won 10 awards, including the Silver Condor for Best Film and Best Film (ex aequo) in the Montréal World Film Festival.

Tiempo de revancha is not only considered as a classic in Latin American cinema and a cult film, but also as a powerful allegory that deals directly with Argentina's last civil-military dictatorship, which was still ruling the country when it was released.

It was selected as the fifth greatest Argentine film of all time in a poll conducted by the Museo del Cine Pablo Ducrós Hicken in 1984, while it ranked 9th in the 2000 edition. In a new version of the survey organized in 2022 by the specialized magazines La vida util, Taipei and La tierra quema, presented at the Mar del Plata International Film Festival, the film reached the 3 position.

== Synopsis ==
Pedro Bengoa, an ex-union organizing demolition worker, and Bruno Di Toro, an old friend of his, decide to blackmail the corrupt company they work for. They set up a fake accident in a copper pit, in which Di Toro pretends to have been struck mute as a consequence of an explosion, and Pedro would corroborate his story. During the explosion things do not go as planned and Di Toro loses his life, leaving Pedro to continue the plan on his own, still pretending to be mute. However, when the company finally agrees to a financial settlement, Pedro refuses to accept; he now wants only justice, and his case goes to the courts. This event changes Pedro's life forever.

== Cast ==
- Federico Luppi ... Pedro Bengoa
- Haydée Padilla ... Amanda Bengoa
- Julio De Grazia ... Larsen
- Ulises Dumont ... Bruno Di Toro
- Joffre Soares ... Aitor
- Aldo Barbero ... Rossi
- Enrique Liporace ... Basile
- Arturo Maly ... García Brown
- Rodolfo Ranni ... Torrens
- Jorge Hacker ... Don Guido Ventura
- Alberto Benegas ... Golo
- Ingrid Pelicori ... Lea Bengoa
- Jorge Chernov ... Jorge
- Cayetano Biondo ... Bautista
- Marcos Woinsky ... Polaco
- Marcela Sotelo
- Lidia Catalano
- Cristina Arocca
- Héctor Calori
- Carlos Verón
- Carlos Trigo
- Osvaldo De la Vega
- Aldo Pastur
- Enrique Latorre
- Jorge Velurtas
- Rafael Casadó
- Enrique Otranto

== Reception ==
Time for Revenge is regarded as the beginning of the transition to democracy for the Argentine cineme, followed the next year by Plata Dulce. According to Adolfo Aristarain, the film was able to outmaneuver the military censorship at the time because of its popularity. Film critic Miriam Coronel argues that, while the lack of nudity, sex, police corruption or political dissidence played a role in this immunity, the censors failed to perceive the struggle of an individual against the economic power as an analogy of the resistance of the citizens to the oppressive state, where the fears and muteness of Bengoa represent the dread and silence of a segment of Argentine society during the dictatorship.
