= Federico Luppi =

Argentine actor (1936–2017)

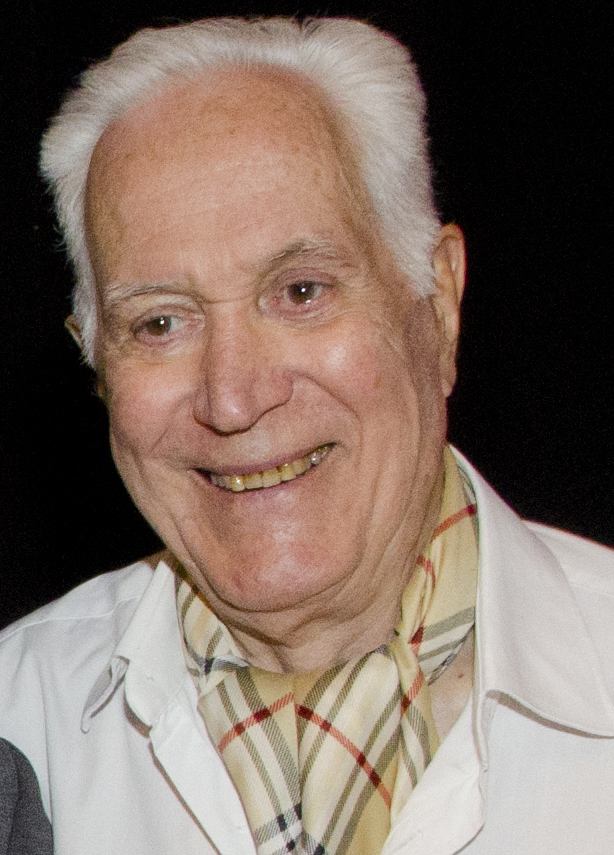
- Federico Luppi in 2014
- Born: February 23, 1936; Ramallo, Argentina
- Died: October 20, 2017 (aged 81); Buenos Aires, Argentina
- Citizenship: Argentine; Spanish (since 2003)
- Occupation: Actor
- Years active: 1964–2017
- Spouse: Susana Hornos (m. 2003)

Federico Luppi (Spanish pronunciation: [feðeˈɾiko lupi]; February 23, 1936 – October 20, 2017) was an Argentine film, television, radio and theatre actor. He won numerous awards throughout his acting career.

== Biography ==
Luppi worked mostly in Argentine cinema, but also worked in Chile, Mexico, Spain, and the United States. He acted in almost 100 films and 50 television series from the time of his debut in 1964. His first films were Pajarito Gómez and Psique y sexo in 1965. In 2004, he directed his first film, Pasos (Steps), made in Spain.

His English-language films (and his work with international directors) include John Sayles' Men with Guns and Los pasos perdidos, among others.

He was one of Guillermo del Toro's favorite actors, and they worked together in three of del Toro's films: Cronos, The Devil's Backbone and Pan's Labyrinth.

Amongst other awards he received a Konex Merit Diploma for his acting in three editions of the Entertainment Konex awards (1981, 1991 and 2001). He was also nominated in 1996 for the Goya Awards as "Best Actor in a Leading Role" for Nobody Will Speak of Us When We're Dead.

Luppi acquired Spanish citizenship in June 2003. He appeared in the film The 33 in 2015.

== Selected filmography ==
- Pajarito Gómez (1965)
- Psique y Sexo (1965) (Manuel Antin con Fernanda Mistral)
- Todo sol es amargo (1966)
- El ABC del amor (1967) as Toto (segment "Noche terrible")
- El romance del Aniceto y la Francisca (1967) as Aniceto
- Las ruteras (1966)
- El Derecho a la felicidad (1968)
- El Proyecto (1969, inedit)
- Después del último tren (1969)
- Pasión dominguera (1970)
- Los herederos (1970) as Carlos
- Mosaico (1970) as Marcelo
- Paula contra la mitad más uno (1971) as Mike González
- Crónica de una señora (1971)
- La revolución (1973)
- Las Venganzas de Beto Sánchez (1973) as Juanjo
- La flor de la mafia (1974) as Luis Alterio
- La Patagonia rebelde (1974, directed by Hector Olivera) as Jose Font, 'Facon Grande'
- Triángulo de cuatro (1975)
- Yo maté a Facundo (1975) as Santos Pérez
- Una mujer (1975)
- Juan que reía (1976) as Sr. Baiocco
- Tiempo de revancha (1981, directed by Adolfo Aristarain) as Pedro Bengoa
- Últimos días de la víctima (1982) as Raúl Mendizábal
- Plata dulce (1982) as Carlos Bonifatti
- El arreglo (1983) as Luis
- No habrá más penas ni olvido (1983, directed by Hector Olivera) as Ignacio Fuentes
- Pasajeros de una pesadilla (1984) as Bernardo Fogelman
- Luna caliente (1985) as Braulio Tennembaum
- Cocaine Wars (1985, directed by Hector Olivera) as Gonzalo Reyes
- La vieja música (1985, directed by Mario Camus) as Martín Lobo
- Les Longs Manteaux (1986) as Garcia
- Sobredosis (1986)
- Sostenido en La menor (1986)
- Malayunta (1986) as Bernardo
- Los líos de Susana (1986)
- El año del conejo (1987) as Pepé Tinelli
- The Stranger (1987, directed by Adolfo Aristarain) as Manager
- La amiga (1988) as Pancho
- Después del último tren (1989)
- Isla se alquila por hora (1989)
- I Don't Owe 100 Times (Cien veces no debo) (1990) as Millán
- Flop (1990) as Grimlat
- Guerriers et captives (1990) as Colonel Garay
- Las tumbas (1991) as Espiga
- Un lugar en el mundo (1992, directed by Adolfo Aristarain) as Domingo
- Matar al abuelito (1993) as Don Mariano Aguero
- Cronos (1993, directed by Guillermo del Toro) as Jesus Gris
- Sin opción (1995)
- Caballos salvajes (1995, directed by Marcelo Piñeyro) as Eusebio
- La ley de la frontera (1995) as El Argentino
- Nadie hablará de nosotras cuando hayamos muerto (1995) as Eduardo
- Extasis (1996) as Daniel
- Sol de otoño (1996, directed by Eduardo Mignogna) as Raul Ferraro
- Martín (Hache) (1997, directed by Adolfo Aristarain) as Martín
- Bajo Bandera (1997, directed by Juan José Jusid) as Coronel Hellman
- Men with Guns (1997) as Dr. Fuentes
- Frontera Sur (1998) as Ciriaco Maidana
- Lisboa (1999, directed by Antonio Hernández) as José Luis
- Las huellas borradas (1999, directed by Enrique Gabriel Lipschutz) as Manuel Perea
- Divertimento (2000) as Daniel Osantos
- Rosarigasinos (2001) as Tito
- El espinazo del diablo (2001, directed by Guillermo del Toro) as Dr. Casares
- Los pasos perdidos (2001) as Bruno Leardi
- El lugar donde estuvo el paraíso (2002) as Consul
- El último tren (2002, directed by Diego Arsuaga) as Pepe
- La balsa de piedra (2002) as Pedro
- Lugares comunes (2002, directed by Adolfo Aristarain) as Fernando Robles
- Machuca (2004, directed by Andrés Wood) as Roberto Ochagavía
- Incautos (2004, directed by Miguel Bardem) as Federico
- Pasos (2005) as Amigo de José
- Elsa & Fred (2005) as Pablo
- El viento (2005, directed by Eduardo Mignogna) as Frank Osorio
- El buen destino (2005, directed by Leonor Benedetto) as Manuel
- Pan's Labyrinth (2006, directed by Guillermo del Toro) as Rey
- La distancia (2006) as Entrenador
- Cara de queso (2006, directed by Ariel Winograd) as Sr. Guerchuni
- La habitación de Fermat (2007, directed by Luis Piedrahita and Rodrigo Sopeña) as Fermat
- El último justo (2007, directed by Manuel Carballo) as El Hombre del Puzzle
- La luna en botella (2007, directed by Grojo) as Rubén Cumplido
- Ese beso (2008, Short, directed by Kamala López)
- Que parezca un accidente (2008, directed by Gerardo Herrero) as Arturo
- Cuestión de principios (2009, directed by Rodrigo Grande) as Adalberto Castilla
- Verano amargo (2009, directed by Juan Carlos Desanzo)
- Sin retorno (2010, directed by Miguel Cohan) as Víctor Marchetti
- Phase 7 (2010, directed by Nicolás Goldbart) as Zanutto
- Cuatro de copas (2011, directed by Pablo Yotich)
- Acorralados (2012) as Antonio Funes
- Puerta de Hierro, el exilio de Perón (2012) as Dr. Antonio Puigvert
- The Corporation (2012) as Dalmaso
- Cuatro de copas (2012)
- Inevitable (2013)
- El gurí (2015)
- Magallanes (2016) as Coronel
- Al final del túnel (2016) as Guttman
- Siete semillas (2016) as Manuel
- Nieve negra (2017, directed by Martín Hodara) as Sepia
- Necronomicón (2018) as Dieter (final film role)

== Awards (partial) ==
Wins

- Los Angeles Latino International Film Festival: Lifetime Achievement Award, 2003.
- Havana Film Festival: Honorary Award, 2002.
- Mar del Plata Film Festival: Best Actor, for: Rosarigasinos, 2001.
- Huelva Latin American Film Festival: Prize of the City of Huelva, 2000.
- Fantasporto: International Fantasy Film Award, Best Actor, for: Cronos, 1993.
- Argentine Film Critics Association Awards: Won six awards for best actor, a record unbroken up to this day.
