= La sombra de Heidegger =

Book by José Pablo Feinmann

- Author: José Pablo Feinmann
- Language: Spanish
- Genre: Thriller
- Published: 2005 (Seix Barral)
- Publication place: Argentina
- Pages: 240 (1st edition)
- ISBN: 950-731-458-X

La sombra de Heidegger (English: The Shadow of Heidegger) is a 2005 thriller written by the Argentine philosopher and novelist José Pablo Feinmann. It depicts an exiled Nazi professor called Dieter Müller who writes a letter to his son, in which he describes the philosophy of Martin Heidegger as the spiritual guidance of the Nazi Party. Besides, La sombra de Heidegger has some elements that would enable it to be included in the category of historical novel. Although there are fictional characters, most of the people involved in the novel are public—and often controversial—figures, such as Adolf Hitler, Ernst Röhm, Jean-Paul Sartre and so on.
The novel also covers topics of Argentine political life. More than once Müller satirizes the situation of peronism in Argentina.

== Plot ==
Dieter Müller wrote his letter in 1948. It was intended to be read by his son, Martin Müller, with the objective of helping him to understand certain aspects of the decisions he made in his life. He tries to answer why he was affiliated to the Nazi Party, and why it is a must for Martin to read Sein und Zeit.

In this line, it is explained that Müller was particularly engaged with Heidegger's ontology, and this is why he focuses his historical analysis in the notion of authenticity. Thus, he shows a major comprehension of the concept of Dasein.

Müller explains in detail some facets of Heidegger's life. He gave an account of Heidegger's emotional engagement with Hannah Arendt, and how this relationship was perceived by SA members, specially by a Müller's friend who was in love with Arendt. It did not make sense for Nazi Party members due to the Jewish condition of Arendt.
He also argues that 1933 Heidegger became Rektor of the University of Freiburg owing to the aid of the SA and specially that of its co-founder and leader, Ernest Rohm. Müller explains that he obtained his Nazi Party membership right after hearing Heidegger's inaugural address, known in English as "The Self-assertion of the German University".

In his exile time in Argentina, he was invited to take part in a Nazi meeting outside the occupied Germany. There he was informed about the Final Solution; he was provided with abundant photographs, documents and documentary films about the horrors of Nazism. Almost utterly sceptical, there was only one photograph that caught his attention. It was an image of an old, undernourished man, who was looking at the camera with haunting gaze. Such an image produced a deep impact in Müller's conscience, and he started to feel profoundly guilty about the death of that single man.

Years later, and after reading the letter of his father over and over, finding and meeting Heidegger became Martin's raison d'être.
