= Ana María Giunta =

Argentine actress

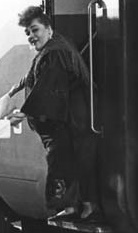
Giunta in 1986

Ana María Giunta (1 March 1943 – 14 March 2015) was an Argentine actress best known for her roles in A King and His Movie (1986), The Supporter (1991), and in Eversmile, New Jersey (1989).

Giunta was born in Concepción del Uruguay, Argentina and died in Buenos Aires from respiratory failure, aged 72.
