= The Supporter =

El Acompañamiento
- Directed by: Carlos Orgambide
- Written by: Carlos Orgambide; Bernardo Roitman; Carlos Gorostiza (play)
- Produced by: Carlos Orgambide
- Starring: Carlos Carella; Franklin Caicedo; Haydée Padilla; María Rosa Gallo
- Cinematography: Eduardo Legaria
- Edited by: Óscar Esparza
- Music by: Mario Cosentino; Víctor Proncet
- Release date: 23 May 1991
- Running time: 86 minutes
- Country: Argentina
- Language: Spanish

El Acompañamiento (English language:The Supporter) is a 1991 Argentine musical drama film directed and written by Carlos Orgambide. The musical was based on a play by Carlos Gorostiza.

== Plot ==
The film is based on Tango music, an integral part of Argentine culture.

The 1991 film is an adaption of a play by the same name written by Carlos Gorostiza, one of the central figures in the Open Theatre movement of the early 1980s. The story revolves around the central character of Tuco, (portrayed by Carlos Carella) a singer who struggles to make his debut on television.

== Release ==
The film debuted in Buenos Aires on 23 May 1991.

== Cast ==
- Carlos Carella as Tuco
- Franklin Caicedo
- Haydée Padilla
- María Rosa Gallo
- Ana María Giunta
- Alberto Busaid
- Oscar Viale
- Enrique Liporace
- Mónica Scapparone
- Carlos Alberto Parrilla
- Fernando Iglesias ("Tacholas")
- Alicia Aresté
- Enrique Mazza
- María Silvia Varela
- Carlos de Urquiza

== Release ==
The film was released on 6 August 1992, in Spain, and was released later in Argentina.

== Awards ==
- 1992 Silver Condor Award for Best Adapted Screenplay
