= A King and His Movie =

La película del rey
- Theatrical release poster
- Directed by: Carlos Sorín
- Written by: Carlos Sorín; Jorge Goldenberg
- Produced by: Axel Pauls
- Starring: Julio Chávez
- Cinematography: Esteban Courtalon
- Edited by: Alberto Yaccelini
- Music by: Carlos Franzetti
- Distributed by: Motion Pictures
- Release date: August 28, 1986 (Argentina)
- Running time: 97 minutes
- Country: Argentina
- Language: Spanish

A King and His Movie (Spanish: La película del rey) is a 1986 Argentine comedy drama film, directed by Carlos Sorín, and written by Sorín and Jorge Goldenberg. The movie features Ulises Dumont and Julio Chávez, among others.

In a survey of the 100 greatest films of Argentine cinema carried out by the Museo del Cine Pablo Ducrós Hicken in 2000, the film reached the 15th position. In a new version of the survey organized in 2022 by the specialized magazines La vida útil, Taipei and La tierra quema, presented at the Mar del Plata International Film Festival, the film reached the 30th position.

== Plot ==
The film tells the story of David Vass (Julio Chávez), an obsessed filmmaker who attempts to make an epic account of the French adventurer Orelie-Antoine de Tounens, who in the 19th century assumed the title of King of Patagonia and Araucania.

Vass meets major obstacles at every turn. Word leaks out to the Argentine media that Vass is finally making his film and he has to dodge them as he executes his preproduction plans. A bigger problem arises as he begins auditioning for the perfect actor to portray the king; when all the professional auditions are rejected, Vass turns to the street. Unfortunately, the man he decides would be perfect for the role is a hippie who mistakes Vass for the police and flees. Vass eventually catches up with him, however, and convinces him to play the part.

Confident that things are looking up, Vass assembles the cast and crew and prepares to go southern Argentina to shoot the film. However, his financial backer withdraws with the film's money and flees abroad. Suddenly unable to pay any of his staff, all of his supporting actors abandon the project. Once more, Vass hits the streets to find replacements.

Finally, the group makes it to the location for shooting. By this time they are so broke that they cannot afford proper lodging and end up staying at an orphanage until an actor makes unwanted advances towards a minor and gets them kicked out. The crew, not wanting to sleep in tents, decides to leave, and the cast joins them. Despite this final crushing blow, Vass will not abandon the film and portrays the king himself, using mannequins for extras to create some of the film's most haunting and surreal scenes.

== Cast ==
- Ulises Dumont as Arturo
- Julio Chávez as David Vass
- Villanueva Cosse as Desfontaines
- Roxana Berco as Lucia
- Ana María Giunta as Madama
- David Llewelyn as Lachaisse
- Miguel Dedovich as Oso
- Marilia Paranhos as Lulu
- Ricardo Hamlin as Maxi
- Rubén Patagonia as Quillapan
- César García as Bonanno

== Distribution ==
The film premiered in Argentina on August 28, 1986.

The film was screened at various film festivals, including; the Toronto International Film Festival, Canada; the Venice Film Festival, Italy; the Havana Film Festival, Cuba; and others.

== Awards ==
Wins

- Venice Film Festival: Silver Lion Best First Work, Carlos Sorin; 1986.
- Havana Film Festival: Grand Coral, First Prize, Carlos Sorin; 1987.
- Goya Awards: Goya Best Spanish Language Foreign Film, Carlos Sorin, Argentina; 1987.
- Argentine Film Critics Association Awards: Silver Condor; Best First Film, Carlos Sorin; Best New Actor, Miguel Dedovich; Best Original Screenplay, Carlos Sorin and Jorge Goldenberg; Best Supporting Actress, Villanueva Cosse; Best Supporting Actress, Ana María Giunta; 1987.
