= University of the Arts London =

Collegiate university in London, England

- Coat of arms of the university
- Former name: London Institute (1986–2004)
- Motto: Primus inter artifices
- Motto in English: First among artists
- Type: Public
- Established: 1986
- Affiliations: Universities UK
- Endowment: £7.29 million (2025)
- Budget: £488.9 million (2024/25)
- Chancellor: Clive Myrie
- Vice-Chancellor: Karen Stanton
- Academic staff: 3,195 (2024/25)
- Administrative staff: 1,955 (2024/25)
- Students: 22,950 (2024/25); 20,625 FTE (2024/25)
- Undergraduates: 16,555 (2024/25)
- Postgraduates: 6,395 (2024/25)
- Other students: 1329 FE (2021/22)
- Location: London, United Kingdom; 51°31′4″N 0°6′59″W
- Colours
- Website: www.arts.ac.uk

The University of the Arts London (UAL) is a public collegiate university in London, England, United Kingdom. It specialises in the arts, design, fashion, and the performing arts. The university is a federation of six arts colleges: Camberwell College of Arts, Central Saint Martins, Chelsea College of Arts, the London College of Communication, the London College of Fashion, and Wimbledon College of Arts.

The University of the Arts London was established as the London Institute in 1986, became a university in 2003, and took its present name in 2004. The university hosts one of the largest international student bodies among all universities in the United Kingdom.

== History ==
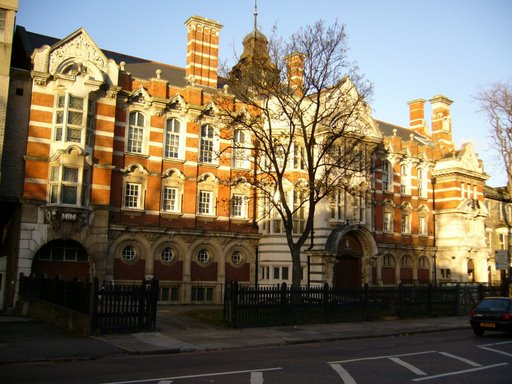
Camberwell College of Arts

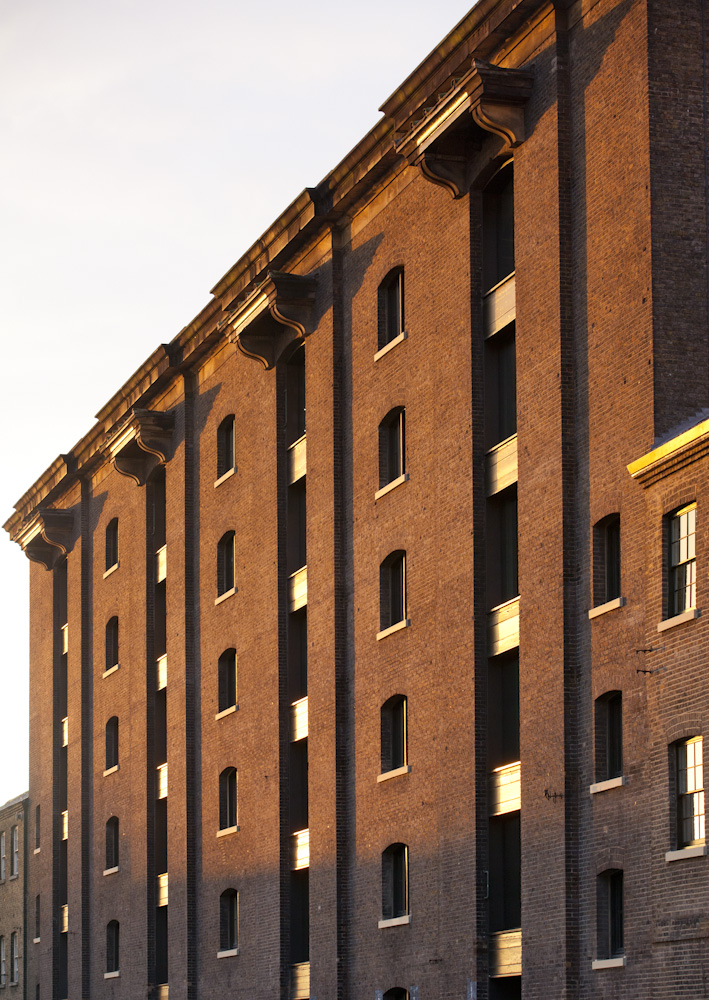
The King's Cross campus of Central Saint Martins

The university has its origins in seven previously independent art, design, fashion and media colleges, which were brought together for administrative purposes to form the London Institute in 1986. They were: Saint Martin's School of Art; Chelsea School of Art; the London College of Printing; the Central School of Art and Design; Camberwell School of Arts and Crafts; the College for Distributive Trades; and the London College of Fashion. The colleges were originally established between the mid-nineteenth and the early twentieth century.

Under the Education Reform Act 1988, the London Institute became a single legal entity, and the first court of governors was instated in the following year, 1989. The first appointed rector was John McKenzie. The institute was granted degree-awarding powers in 1993 by the Privy Council. Sir William Stubbs was appointed rector after the retirement of McKenzie in 1996. A coat of arms was granted to the institute in 1998. Will Wyatt was appointed chairman of governors in 1999, and Lord Stevenson of Coddenham was installed as the first chancellor in 2000.

On the retirement of Sir William Stubbs as rector in 2001, Sir Michael Bichard was appointed and he encouraged the London Institute to apply for university status. The London Institute originally chose not to apply because its individual colleges were internationally recognised in their own right. In 2003, the London Institute received Privy Council approval for university status; the name was changed to the present one in 2004.

Wimbledon School of Art joined the university as a sixth college in 2006, and was renamed Wimbledon College of Arts. Sir John Tusa was appointed chairman, replacing Will Wyatt, in 2007. Nigel Carrington was appointed rector in 2008, replacing Sir Michael Bichard.

From 2008 to 2010, staff were made redundant and courses closed. At the London College of Communication, where 16 of the 19 courses were discontinued in 2009, staff resigned and students demonstrated and staged a sit-in in protest at the cuts in budget and staff numbers.

Central Saint Martins moved to a purpose-built complex in King's Cross in June 2011.

In 2015, Grayson Perry was appointed to succeed Kwame Kwei-Armah as chancellor of the university.

James Purnell replaced Nigel Carrington as vice-chancellor and president in March 2021. James Purnell announced his intention to move on from his role as President & Vice-Chancellor of UAL in June 2024 and left in September 2024 to take up a role as CEO of Flint Global. Professor Karen Stanton was appointed as Interim President and Vice-Chancellor at UAL before being made permanent in March 2025. Karen has previously held roles as Vice Chancellor at Bishop Grosseteste University, York St John and Solent Universities. She also served on UAL's Court of Governors but stood down on taking on the role of Vice-Chancellor.

== Colleges ==
The University of the Arts London has six constituent colleges:

=== Camberwell College of Arts ===
Camberwell School of Arts and Crafts was established by the Technical Education Board of the London County Council on 10 January 1898, in a building beside the South London Gallery, with the financial support of John Passmore Edwards and following advocacy by Edward Burne-Jones, Lord Leighton, Walter Crane and G. F. Watts. The subjects taught were mainly technical until a Fine Arts department was established between the Wars. The school became part of the London Institute in January 1986, and was renamed Camberwell College of Arts in 1989.

=== Central Saint Martins ===
Central Saint Martins College was formed in 1989 by the merger of Saint Martin's School of Art, founded 1854, and the Central School of Art and Design, founded as the Central School of Arts and Crafts in 1896. Drama Centre London, founded in 1963, became part of Central Saint Martins in 1999, and the Byam Shaw School of Art, founded in 1910, was merged into CSM in 2003. The school was renamed Central Saint Martins College of Arts and Design in 2011.

=== Chelsea College of Arts ===
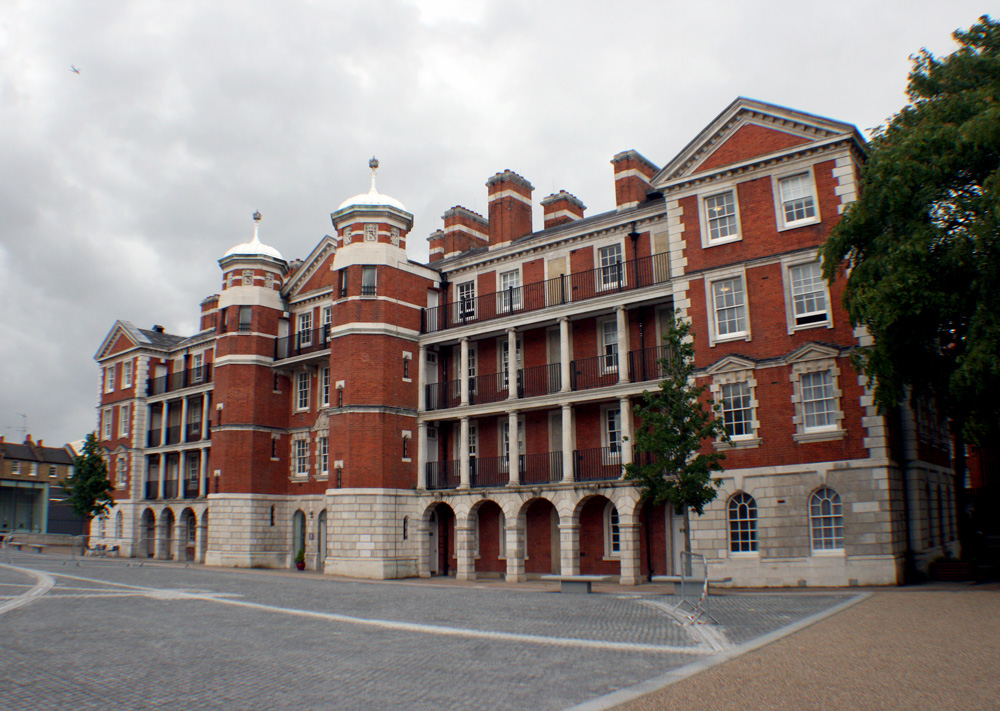
Chelsea College of Art and Design

The Chelsea School of Art originated as part of the South-Western Polytechnic, which opened in 1895 and in 1922 became the Chelsea Polytechnic. In 1957 the science department of the polytechnic was renamed Chelsea College of Science and Technology; the School of Art became independent from it at that time, and merged with the Regent Street Polytechnic School of Art to create the Chelsea School of Art in 1964. In 1975 Chelsea merged with Hammersmith College of Art and Building, founded in 1891 by Francis Hawke and taken over by the London County Council in 1904. The Chelsea School of Art became part of the London Institute in 1986 and was renamed Chelsea College of Art and Design in 1989.

=== London College of Communication ===
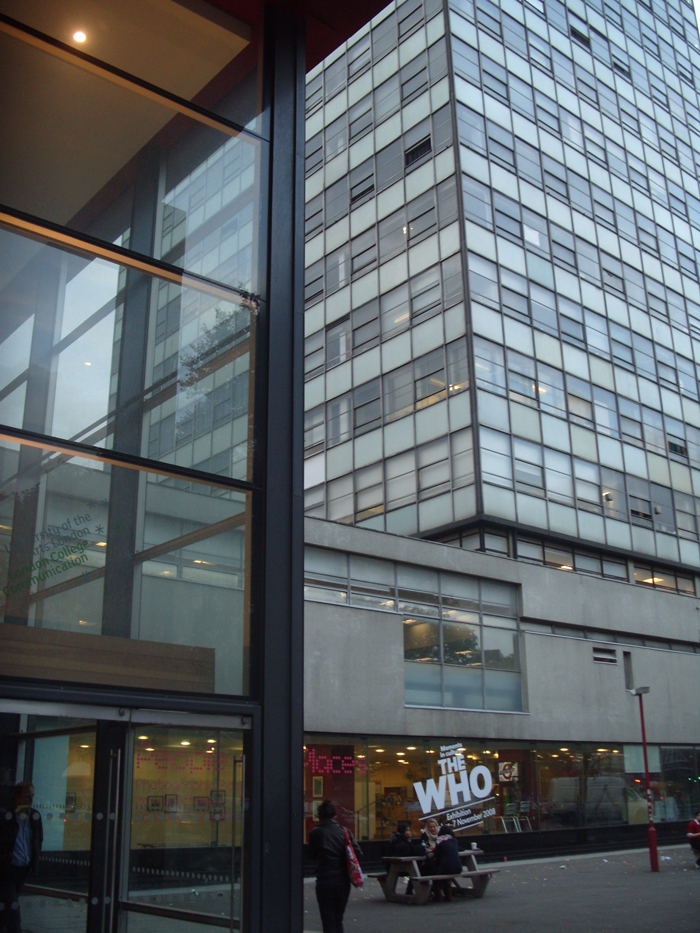
The London College of Communication

The London College of Printing descends from the St Bride's Foundation Institute Printing School, which was established in November 1894 under the City of London Parochial Charities Act 1883. The Guild and Technical School opened in Clerkenwell in the same year, but moved a year later to Bolt Court, and became the Bolt Court Technical School; it was later renamed the London County Council School of Photoengraving and Lithography. St Bride's came under the control of the London County Council in 1922 and was renamed the London School of Printing and Kindred Trades; in 1949 it was merged with the LCC School of Photoengraving and Lithography, forming the London School of Printing and Graphic Arts. In 1960 this was renamed the London College of Printing. The printing department of the North Western Polytechnic was merged into it in 1969. The London College of Printing became part of the London Institute in 1986.

The Westminster Day Continuation School opened in 1921, and was later renamed the College for Distributive Trades. It became part of the London Institute in 1986. In 1990 it merged with the London College of Printing to form the London College of Printing and Distributive Trades, which in 1996 was renamed the London College of Communication.

=== London College of Fashion ===
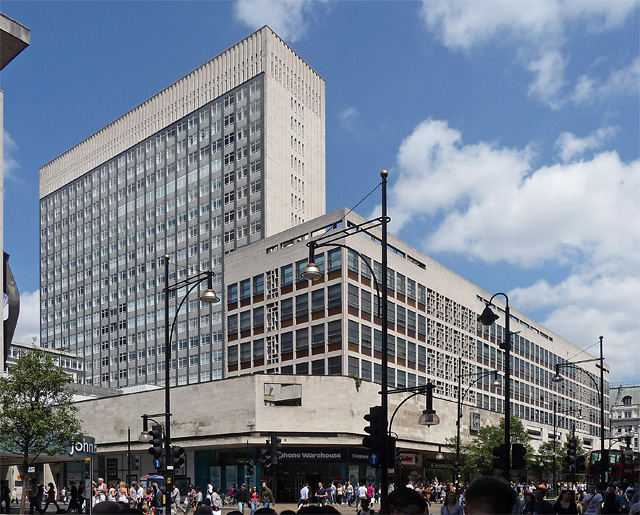
The London College of Fashion

The London College of Fashion derives from three trade schools for women, the Shoreditch Technical Institute Girls Trade School, founded in 1906, Barrett Street Trade School, founded in 1915, and Clapham Trade School, founded in 1927; all were established by the Technical Education board of the London County Council to train skilled workers for the clothing and hairdressing trades. The Barrett Street school became a technical college after the Education Act 1944 and was renamed Barrett Street Technical College. Shoreditch also became a technical college; in 1955 it merged with Clapham Trade School to form Shoreditch College for the Garment Trades. In 1966 it was renamed Shoreditch College for the Clothing Industry and in 1967 merged with Barrett Street Technical College to become the London College for the Garment Trades, which in 1974 was renamed the London College of Fashion. It became part of the London Institute in January 1986. In August 2000 it merged with Cordwainers College, founded as the Leather Trade School by the Leathersellers and Cordwainers Company in 1887 in Bethnal Green, and later renamed the Cordwainers Technical College and, in 1991, Cordwainers College.

=== Wimbledon College of Arts ===
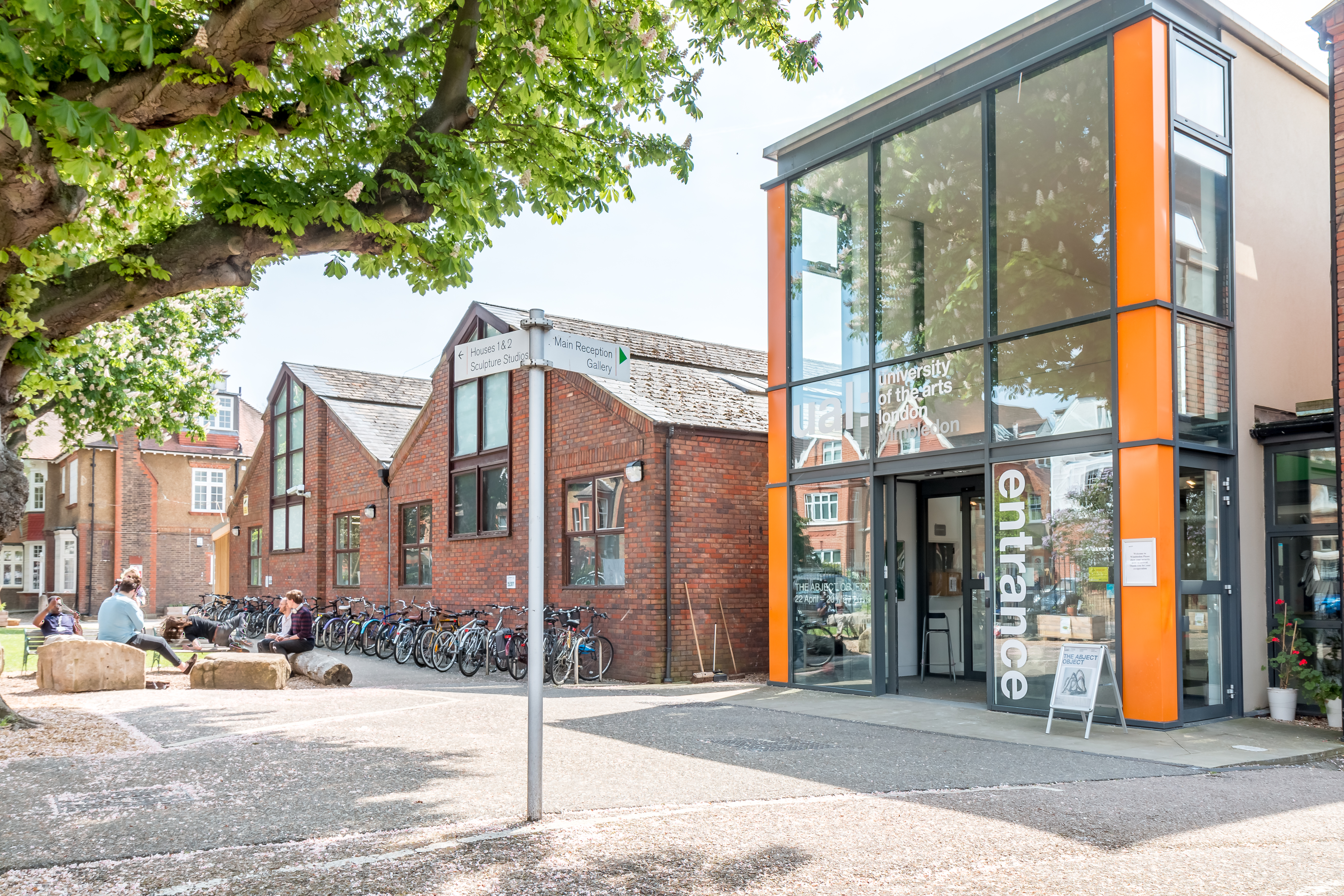
Wimbledon College of Arts

The foundation of Wimbledon College of Arts goes back to 1890, when an art class for the Rutlish School for Boys was started. Between 1904 and 1920 this was housed in the Wimbledon Technical Institute in Gladstone Road. It became independent in 1930 and moved to Merton Hall Road in 1940. Theatre design was taught from 1932, and became a department in 1948. In 1993 the school, which previously had been controlled by the London Borough of Merton, was incorporated as an independent higher education institution. Wimbledon School of Art became part of University of the Arts London in 2006 and was renamed Wimbledon College of Arts.

== Organisation and administration ==
The University is a higher education corporation established under Section 121 of the Education Reform Act 1988, and is an exempt charity under charity legislation.

In the financial year to 31 July 2025, the university had a total income of £494.9 million and total expenditure of £467.9 million. Sources of income included £410.3 million from tuition fees and education contracts, £19.3 million from funding body grants, £3.1 million from research grants and contracts, £11.1 million from investment income, £1.6 million from donations and endowments and £49.5 million from other income.

== Academic profile ==
Rankings
National rankings
- Complete (2027): 27=
- Guardian (2027): 10
- Times / Sunday Times (2027): 44=

Global rankings
- QS (2027): 851–900
- THE (2026): 1501+

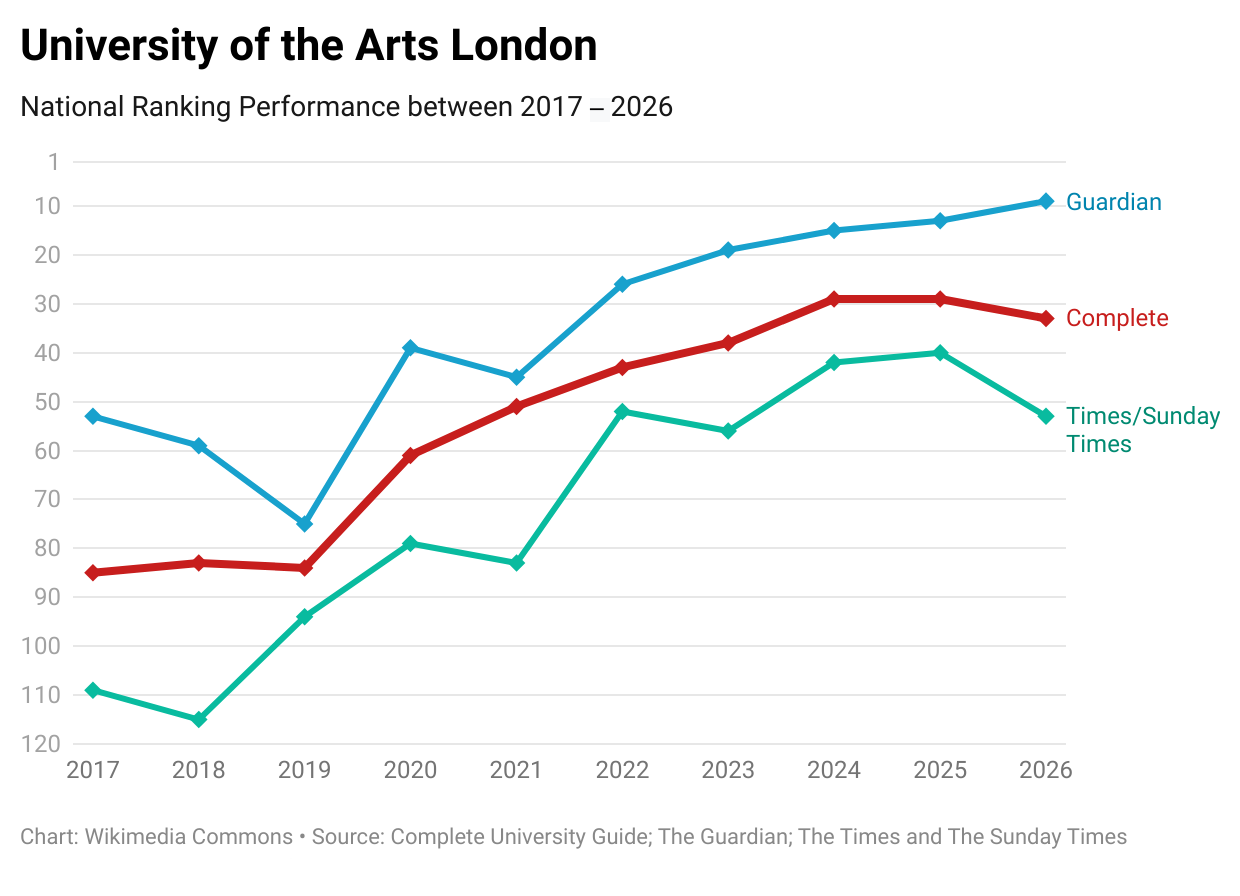
University of the Arts London's national league table performance over the past ten years

=== Reputation and rankings ===
Since 2019 the university has been ranked in second position for art and design in the QS World University Rankings.

UAL received an overall ranking of 27 out of 130 in the 2027 Complete University Guide league tables, up from 38th place in 2023 and 29th in the 2024 ranking. It scored 63.7 out of 100 for graduate prospects, and 3.13 out of 5 for student satisfaction. UAL was ranked 9th in the 2026 Guardian University Guide.

A Queen's Anniversary Prize was awarded to Camberwell College of Arts for the conservation of "works of art on paper" in 1996. The prize was also awarded to Central Saint Martins College of Art and Design for its contributions to the British fashion industry, and for nurturing the creativity of students, in 1998. Cordwainers College of London College of Fashion was awarded the prize for its continued excellence in shoe and accessory design, development and teaching practice in 2008. The University of the Arts London was among the twenty winners of the prize in 2013, for its "industrial and product design".

Central Saint Martins and the London College of Communication have been awarded Skillset Media Academy status, recognising the achievements in the area of media, interactive design and film respectively.

Chelsea College of Arts and the London College of Fashion share the "Creative Learning in Practice Centre for Excellence in Teaching and Learning". The centre is funded by the British government in recognition of the two colleges' results in developing student learning.

=== Admissions ===
UCAS Admission Statistics
	2025	2024	2023	2022	2021
Applications (Note: Main scheme applications, International and UK)	35,210	34,555	33,270	33,735	26,270
Accepted	6,260	5,765	5,110	5,240	4,510
Applications/Accepted Ratio	5.6	6.0	6.5	6.4	5.8
Overall Offer Rate (%)	47.3	42.8	38.5	37.6	41.9
↳ UK only (%) (Note: UK domiciled applicants)	50.0	48.9	45.2	43.9	44.7
Average Entry Tariff	—N/a	—N/a	136	145	150
↳ Top three exams (Note: The maximum tariff score for three exams is 168: the equivalent of A*A*A* at A-Level, 777 at HL for the IB Diploma Programme, or AAA at Advanced Higher)	—N/a	—N/a	131.3	137.7	138.0

HESA Student Body Composition (2024/25)
Domicile and Ethnicity	Total
British White (Note: Not be confused solely with White British)	29%
British Ethnic Minorities (Note: Includes those who indicate that they identify as Asian, Black, Mixed Heritage, Arab or any other ethnicity except White.)	18%
International EU	5%
International Non-EU	49%
Undergraduate Widening Participation Indicators
Female	76%
Independent School	8%
Low Participation Areas (Note: Calculated from the Polar4 measure, using Quintile1, in England and Wales. Calculated from the Scottish Index of Multiple Deprivation (SIMD) measure, using SIMD20, in Scotland.)	7%

In the 2024/25 academic year, the student body consisted of 22,950 students, composed of 16,555 undergraduates and 6,395 postgraduate students. The university is designated as a 'high-tariff' institution, sometimes 'medium-tariff', by the Department for Education, with the average undergraduate entrant to the university in recent years amassing between 131–138 UCAS Tariff points in their top three pre-university qualifications – the equivalent of ABB to AAB at A-Level. Based on 2022/23 HESA entry standards data published in domestic league tables, which include a broad range of qualifications beyond the top three exam grades, the average student at UAL achieved 145 points. The university gave offers of admission to 43.2% of its undergraduate applicants in 2022, the 10th lowest offer rate across the country.

=== Research ===
The 2001 Research Assessment Exercise published results by subject area on a point scale from 1, 2, 3a, 3b, 4, 5 to 5*, the University achieved a 5 rating. In 2006–07, this rating equated to a QR grant of £8.6 million. In the 2008 Research Assessment Exercise the Times Higher Education's RAE league tables placed the university 44th out of 132 universities in the institution-wide table. In the "Art and Design" subject tables it was placed 22nd out of 72 submissions (for "submission A" – the majority of the constituent colleges) and 23rd out of 72 submissions (for "submission B" – Wimbledon College of Art alone). The university had the largest number of researchers in the arts and design subject area (237.89 full-time equivalent staff); it was followed by Glasgow School of Art with 76.85 equivalent staff. More than half the university's research was rated as "world leading" or "internationally excellent", and 77.5 per cent as internationally significant. An open-access collection of its research outputs, including text and multi-media items, was developed in 2009 by the Kultur project of the Joint Information Systems Committee.

== Student life ==
The University of the Arts London Students' Union (stylised as Arts Students' Union or Arts SU) offers various services to students, including running student-led sports clubs and societies. They also operate arts-based opportunities to students, represent students through six elected Sabbatical Officers, and offer independent advice to members.

The university has 13 halls of residence in various parts of London. It is fourth among United Kingdom institutions by number of international students.
