= The Deal (1983 film) =

El Arreglo
- A still from the film
- Directed by: Fernando Ayala
- Written by: Roberto Cossa; Carlos Somigliana
- Produced by: Fernando Ayala
- Starring: Federico Luppi; Julio De Grazia; Rodolfo Ranni; Haydée Padilla; Susú Pecoraro
- Cinematography: Victor Hugo Caula
- Edited by: Eduardo López
- Music by: Jorge Valcarcel
- Release date: 1983
- Running time: 90 minutes
- Countries: Argentina; Spain
- Language: Spanish

The Deal (Spanish: El Arreglo) is a 1983 Argentine drama film directed by Fernando Ayala and written by Roberto Cossa and Carlos Somigliana. The film premiered on 19 May 1983 in Buenos Aires. It was entered into the 13th Moscow International Film Festival where it won a Special Diploma.

== Plot summary ==
Luis, a hard working and honest family man living in a small town, becomes involved in a moral quandary: Water service has come to his street, but only one side of the street. Due to a technical error, Luis and everyone on his side simply won't be getting the service. However, the water company foreman is open to bribes in order to provide water to the other side of the street. When Luis declines to bribe the man for his family, everyone on his side, neighbours and family included, turn against him, and the foreman resents him.

After some time, Luis relents and tries to bribe the foreman, but things go wrong when the foreman calls him a hypocrite and insults him. Luis backs down on a deal and the situation ends in a fight between the two of them. In the end, Luis' moral struggle proves him right, though it happens at a cost.

== Cast ==
- Federico Luppi
- Julio De Grazia
- Rodolfo Ranni
- Haydée Padilla
- Susú Pecoraro
- Dora Prince
- Margara Alonso
- Maria Visconti
- Mario Alarcón
- Manuel Callau
- Andrea Tenuta
- Emilio Vidal
- Pascual Pelliciota
- Mario Luciani
- Carlos Trigo
