= Christine Yoo =

American writer and filmmaker

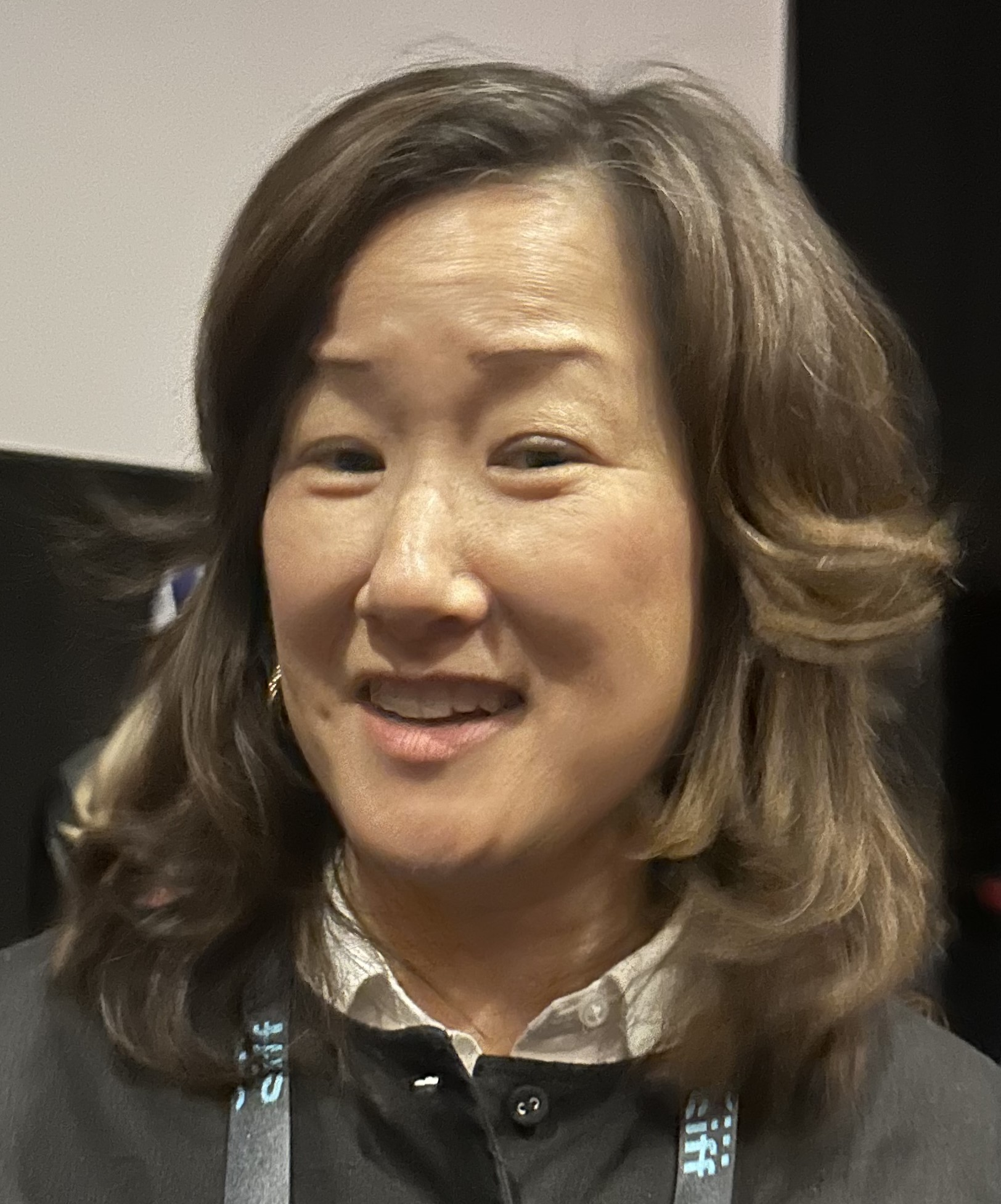
- Alma mater: USC School of Cinematic Arts
- Occupation: Writer, film director, film producer

Christine Yoo is an American writer, director, producer and filmmaker. She has written and directed a romantic-comedy feature film entitled "Wedding Palace," starring Brian Tee, Kang Hye-jung, Bobby Lee, Margaret Cho, Joy Osmanski, Steve Park, Kelvin Han Yee, Elaine Kao, Charles Kim, Jean Yoon, Nancy J. Lee, Simon Rhee, and more. The film is a U.S.-Korea joint production that won Best Feature Film and Best Cinematography at the Cine Gear Expo Film Series Competition and a Golden Angel Award for Best Asian American Film at the Chinese American Film Festival and was also an official selection of the Los Angeles Asian Pacific Film Festival, the Asian American International Film Festival, the Philadelphia Asian American Film Festival and a number of other film festivals. For the film, Yoo also received a Best Director award at the Atlanta Korean Film Festival as well. Yoo has also served as a writer on the animated series Afro Samurai, scripting at least 5 episodes of the show. Yoo has also served as an Assistant Editor on TV shows such as VH1's Behind The Music, Motown 40: The Music is Forever, and an Apprentice Editor on the feature film Slums of Beverly Hills. Yoo has also written and directed a short film entitled "Yellow Belle", a mid-1980s set film about an Asian American teenage girl who comes of age in America's South.

Yoo directed 26.2 to Life, released in 2022, a documentary that portrays incarcerated runners who complete a marathon within San Quentin State Prison.

Yoo is a graduate of the USC Film School.

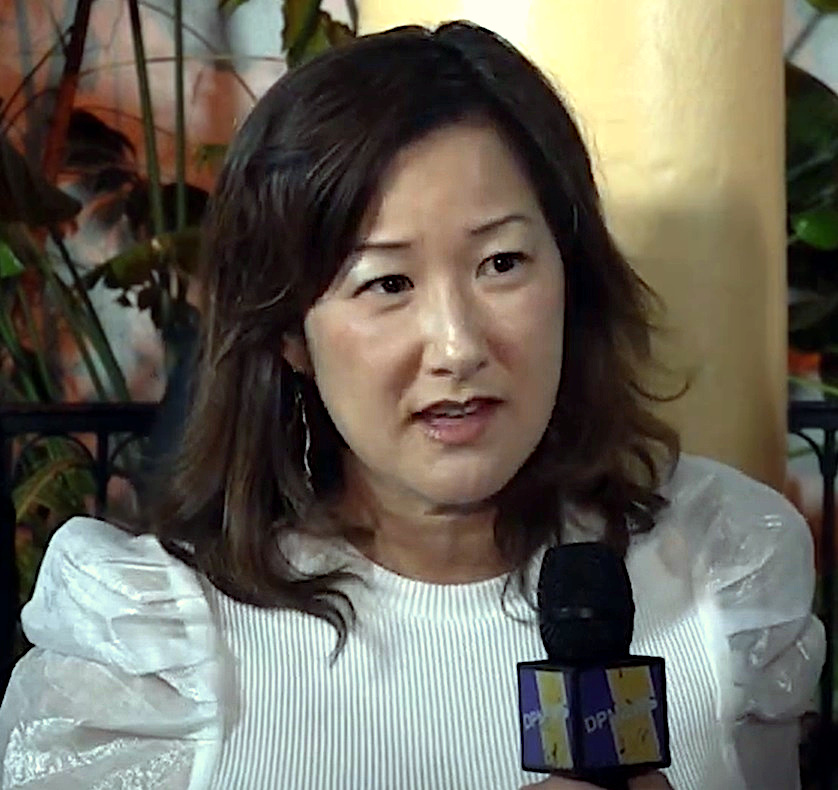
Christine Yoo at SBIFF 2023
