= Dancing Queen (2023 film) =

2023 Norwegian film directed by Aurora Gossé

- Directed by: Aurora Langaas Gossé
- Written by: Silje Holtet Robsahm
- Produced by: Thomas Robsahm
- Starring: Anne Marit Jacobsen, Andrea Bræin Hovig, Cengiz Al, Anders Baasmo, Frida Ånnevik, Viljar Knutsen Bjaadal
- Cinematography: Åsmund Hasli
- Edited by: Helge Billing
- Music by: Mimmi Tamba
- Production company: Amarcord
- Distributed by: Scandinavian Film Distribution
- Release dates: February 18, 2023 (Berlin Film Festival); March 10, 2023 (Norway)
- Running time: 92 minutes
- Country: Norway
- Language: Norwegian

Dancing Queen is a 2023 Norwegian family film directed by Aurora Gossé. The film is Gossé's first feature film as a director. Liv Elvira Kippersund Larsson plays the lead role as 12-year-old Mina, who falls in love with a young hip hop artist who starts at the same school, and therefore tries to join his dance group, in spite her inability to dance.

The film had its world premiere at the Berlin Film Festival on February 18, 2023 and its Norwegian theatrical premiere on March 10 of the same year. It was named best children's film at the Norwegian Film Institute's 2023 Amanda Award (Norwegian Wikipedia: Amandaprisen 2023). Dancing Queen also won the award for best comedy at the BUFF children's film festival in Malmö, the audience award at the Seattle International Film Festival and the ECFA award for best European children's film at the Kristiansand International Children's Film Festival, all in 2023. It was nominated for the Crystal Bear for best children's and youth film at the Berlin Film Festival.

== Cast ==
- Liv Elvira Kippersund Larsson as Mina
- Viljar Knutsen Bjaadal as Edwin, alias the artist E.D. Win
- Anne Marit Jacobsen as Mina's maternal grandmother
- Andrea Bræin Hovig as Anne Berit, Mina's mother
- Cengiz Al as Shaan, dance teacher
- Anders Baasmo as Ove, Mina's father
- Sturla Harbitz as Markus
- Frida Ånnevik as apprentice

== Sequel ==
A sequel, Dancing Queen in Hollywood, screened on May 16, 2025 at the Seattle International Film Festival, and opened in Norway on September 25, 2025.
