= Last Days of the Victim =

1982 film

- Directed by: Adolfo Aristarain
- Written by: Adolfo Aristarain; José Pablo Feinmann
- Based on: Last Days of the Victim by José Pablo Feinmann
- Produced by: Héctor Olivera; Luis Osvaldo Repetto
- Starring: Federico Luppi; Soledad Silveyra; Ulises Dumont; Julio de Grazia
- Cinematography: Horacio Maira
- Edited by: Eduardo López
- Music by: Emilio Kauderer
- Production company: Aries Cinematográfica Argentina
- Distributed by: Aries Cinematográfica Argentina
- Release date: 8 April 1982
- Running time: 90 minutes
- Country: Argentina
- Language: Spanish

Last Days of the Victim (Spanish: Últimos días de la víctima) is a 1982 Argentine crime thriller film directed by Adolfo Aristarain and starring Federico Luppi. It was written by Aristarain and José Pablo Feinmann, and based on Feinmann's novel of the same name. The film was selected as the Argentine entry for the Best Foreign Language Film at the 55th Academy Awards, but was not accepted as a nominee.

In a survey of the 100 greatest films of Argentine cinema carried out by the Museo del Cine Pablo Ducrós Hicken in 2000, the film reached the 23rd position. In a new version of the survey organized in 2022 by the specialized magazines La vida útil, Taipei and La tierra quema, presented at the Mar del Plata International Film Festival, the film reached the 36th position.

== Plot ==
Mendizábal, a professional hitman, is ordered by his anonymous client to spy and murder a wealthy man. But while in his precise and obsessive pursuit, Mendizábal slowly realizes he is being part of a mysterious game of cat and mouse, which itself is tied to a chain of many personal interests.

== Cast ==
- Federico Luppi as Raúl Mendizábal
- Soledad Silveyra as Cecilia Ravenna
- Ulises Dumont as "El Gato" (The Cat) Funes
- Julio de Grazia as Carlos Ravenna
- Arturo Maly as Rodolfo Külpe
- Elena Tasisto as Laura Ramos de Külpe
- Enrique Liporace as Peña
- China Zorrilla as Beba (Landlady)
- Mónica Galán as Vienna
- Carlos Ferreiro as Ferrari

== See also ==
- List of submissions to the 55th Academy Awards for Best Foreign Language Film
- List of Argentine submissions for the Academy Award for Best Foreign Language Film
