= Karen Stanton =

British historian and academic

Professor Karen Stanton
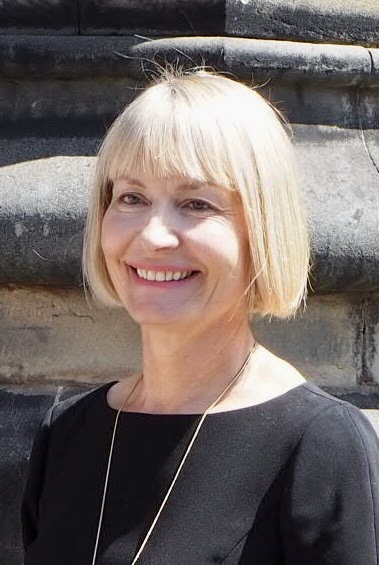
- Professor Karen Stanton in July 2018
- Education: Professor
- Alma mater: University of Sheffield Manchester Metropolitan University
- Occupations: Academic Administration and Lecturing

Karen Stanton is a British historian, academic and the former Vice Chancellor of both York St John University and Solent University.

== Education ==
Stanton holds a bachelor's degree in history from University of Sheffield and a post graduate qualification in information science from Manchester Metropolitan University.

== Career ==
Stanton was the Vice Chancellor of Solent University until April 2023. She was previously Vice Chancellor of York St John University, deputy Vice Chancellor at Glasgow Caledonian University. She has previously held positions at Birmingham University, King's College London, Sheffield Hallam and Nottingham University.

Prior to her accession, she was chair of the cathedral's group and vice chair of GuildHE. She was responsible for GCU's overseas campuses in Bangladesh, Oman and New York, and was a member of the United Nations Alliance for United Kingdom. She also worked with BBC as a researcher. She became Vice Chancellor of University of the Arts London in March 2025.
