= Félix Monti =

Argentine cinematographer

Félix Monti (born 1938) is an Argentine film cinematographer.

Two of his films have won the Academy Award for Best Foreign Film: The Official Story (1985) and The Secret in Their Eyes (2010).

== Filmography (partial) ==
- La Historia oficial (1985) a.k.a. The Official Story
- Old Gringo (1989)
- The Plague (1992)
- Un Muro de Silencio (1993) a.k.a. A Wall of Silence
- Bela Donna (1998) a.k.a. White Dunes
- O Auto da Compadecida (2000) a.k.a. A Dog's Will
- Caramuru – A Invenção do Brasil (2001)
- Rosarigasinos (2001) a.k.a. Gangs from Rosario
- A Partilha (2001) a.k.a. The Inheritance
- Assassination Tango (2002) a.k.a. Assassination Tango
- A Paixão de Jacobina (2002) a.k.a. The Passion of Jacobina
- Peligrosa obsesión (2004)
- La Niña santa (2004) a.k.a. The Holy Girl
- Nordeste (2005)
- El secreto de sus ojos (2009)

== Television (partial) ==
- Vientos de agua (2005) TV series
