= Haydée Padilla =

Argentine actress (1936–2022)

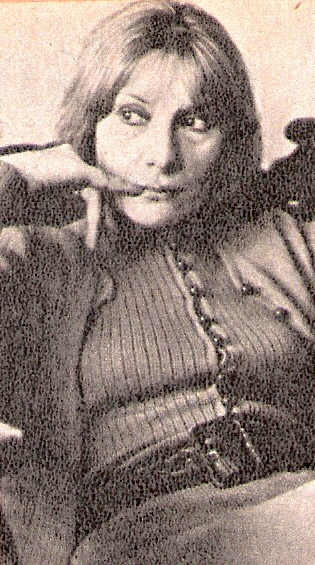
- Padilla in 1976
- Born: 15 November 1936; Buenos Aires, Argentina
- Died: 14 December 2022 (aged 86); Mar del Plata, Argentina
- Occupation: Actress
- Years active: 1965–2019

Haydée Padilla (15 November 1936 – 14 December 2022) was an Argentine actress. She appeared in more than forty films from 1965 to 2019.

Padilla died on 14 December 2022, at the age of 86.

== Selected filmography ==
Year	Title	Role	Notes
1965	El Reñidero		
1981	Time for Revenge		
1983	The Deal		
1991	The Supporter		
