= Adolfo Aristarain =

Argentine film director and screenwriter (1943–2026)

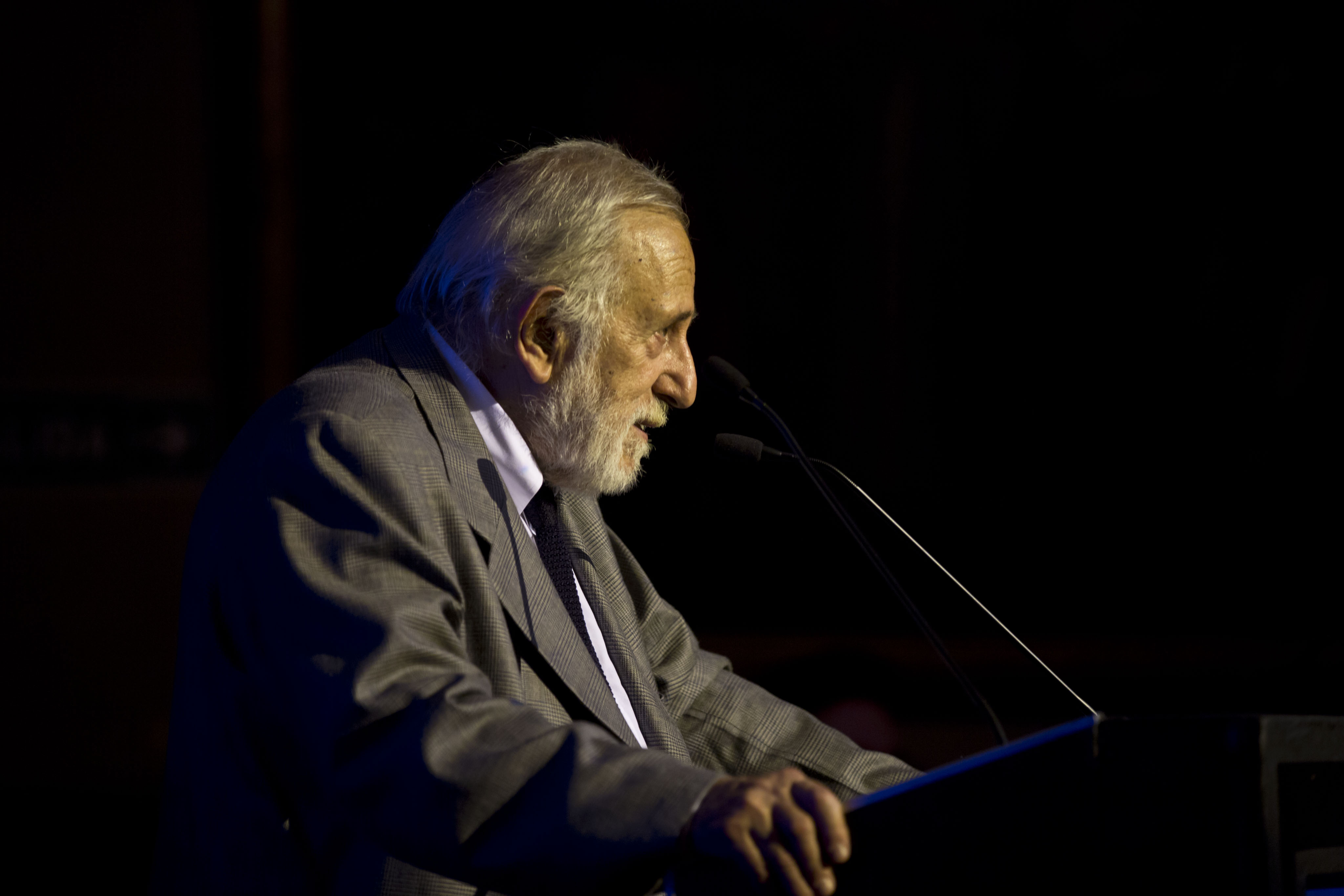
- Aristarain in 2016
- Born: October 19, 1943; Buenos Aires, Argentina
- Died: April 26, 2026 (aged 82); Buenos Aires, Argentina
- Citizenship: Argentina; Spain (since 2003)
- Occupations: Film director, screenwriter
- Awards: Golden Shell, Best Director at Havana Film Festival, Grand Prix des Amériques at Montréal World Film Festival

Adolfo Aristarain (October 19, 1943 – April 26, 2026) was an Argentine film director and screenwriter who is known for his filmic sophistication and subtle examination of issues of political oppression. Variety deemed him "a master filmmaker."

== Life and career ==
Aristarain was born in Buenos Aires on October 19, 1943. After leaving Argentina, he started working as assistant director in the Arcente cinema, and then in Europe during his short exile for Mario Camus, Giorgio Stegani and Lewis Gilbert before returning to Argentina in 1974, following the death of Argentine president Juan Perón. His first three films did not receive favorable reviews, but in 1981 Time for Revenge received both critical acclaim and public success. Released in the midst of the so-called Dirty War when Argentina was ruled by a military junta, the film had strong political undercurrents but faced few problems from censors. As Aristarain would later explain, he initially included long, unnecessary sex scenes in the film, "so the censors took five days and questioned things—not politics or ideology but sex. All I had to do was cut a few frames at the end of some scenes, like one of a strip tease. It doesn't hurt the scenes—especially if you made them longer than they should have been."

Back in Spain he directed a mini-series for television, and after a series of aborted projects he had renewed success in Argentina: A Place in the World, starring Federico Luppi, with whom he has maintained frequent collaboration. He then filmed The Law of the Frontier and Martín (Hache) in Spain, also starring Luppi. Aristarain continued with his Argentine-Spanish mixture of actors in Common Ground and Roma.

Aristarain wrote all the scripts of his directed movies with the exception of the Columbia Pictures release The Stranger, which was written by American screenwriter Dan Gurskis.

He received numerous awards for his work, including the Golden Shell and an Academy Award nomination for A Place in the World, Best Director award at the Havana Film Festival, and Golden Seashell nomination for Martín (Hache), the First Prize at the Havana Film Festival and the Grand Prix des Amériques award at the Montréal World Film Festival for Time for Revenge.

The Academy Award Nomination was disqualified by the Academy of Motion Picture Arts and Sciences because the film was submitted for consideration (for Best Foreign Movie) by Uruguay (his wife's country) while the Academy claimed it was an Argentine production, and should therefore have been submitted by that country.

Aristarain worked many times with several, notable actors, such as Federico Luppi (seven times), Julio de Grazia (four times), Cecilia Roth (three times), Ricardo Darín (three times) and Ulises Dumont (twice). He held Spanish citizenship since 2003.

Aristarain died in Buenos Aires on April 26, 2026, at the age of 82.

== Filmography ==
- La parte del león (1978)
- La playa del amor (1979)
- The Disco of Love (1980)
- Time for Revenge (1981)
- Last Days of the Victim (1982)
- The Stranger (1987)
- A Place in the World (1992)
- The Law of the Frontier (1995)
- Martín (Hache) (1997)
- Common Ground (2002)
- Roma (2004)

== Awards and nominations ==
Year	Award	Category	Title	Result
1982	Argentine Film Critics Association Awards	Best Screenplay	Time for Revenge	Won
1982	Argentine Film Critics Association Awards	Best Director	Time for Revenge	Won
1982	Chicago International Film Festival	Best Feature	Time for Revenge	Nominated
1982	Havana Film Festival	Grand Coral - First Prize	Time for Revenge	Won
1982	Montréal World Film Festival	Grand Prix Award	Time for Revenge	Won
1982	Huelva Latin American Film Festival	Golden Colon	Last Days of the Victim	Won
1982	Mystfest	Best Film	Last Days of the Victim	Nominated
1982	Mystfest	Best Screenplay	Last Days of the Victim	Won
1983	Argentine Film Critics Association Awards	Best Screenplay	Last Days of the Victim	Won
1983	Argentine Film Critics Association Awards	Best Director	Last Days of the Victim	Won
1984	Cognac Festival du Film Policier	Critics Award	Time for Revenge	Won
1992	Nantes Three Continents Festival	Audience Award	A Place in the World	Won
1992	San Sebastián International Film Festival	Golden Seashell	A Place in the World	Won
1992	San Sebastián International Film Festival	OCIC Award	A Place in the World	Won
1993	Argentine Film Critics Association Awards	Best Screenplay	A Place in the World	Nominated
1993	Argentine Film Critics Association Awards	Best Director	A Place in the World	Won
1993	Fribourg International Film Festival	Audience Award	A Place in the World	Won
1993	Goya Awards	Best Spanish Film	A Place in the World	Won
1993	Gramado Film Festival	Best Latin Film	A Place in the World	Won
1993	Ondas Awards	Best Director	A Place in the World	Won
1993	Turia Awards	Best Foreign Film	A Place in the World	Won
1996	Argentine Film Critics Association Awards	Best Screenplay	The Law of the Frontier	Nominated
1996	Argentine Film Critics Association Awards	Best Director	The Law of the Frontier	Nominated
1997	Havana Film Festival	Audience Award	Martín (Hache)	Nominated
1997	Havana Film Festival	Grand Coral - First Prize	Martín (Hache)	Won
1997	Havana Film Festival	Best Director	Martín (Hache)	Won
1997	San Sebastián International Film Festival	Golden Seashell	Martín (Hache)	Nominated
1998	Argentine Film Critics Association Awards	Best Director	Martín (Hache)	Won
1998	Argentine Film Critics Association Awards	Best Screenplay	Martín (Hache)	Nominated
1998	Butaca Awards	Best Art House Film	Martín (Hache)	Nominated
1998	Fribourg International Film Festival	Award of the Pestalozzi Foundation	Martín (Hache)	Won
1998	Goya Awards	Best Director	Martín (Hache)	Nominated
1998	Oslo Films from the South Festival	Audience Award	Martín (Hache)	Won
1998	Valdivia International Film Festival	Audience Award	Martín (Hache)	Won
2002	Huelva Latin American Film Festival	Prize of the City of Huelva		Won
2002	Havana Film Festival	Vigia Award	Common Ground	Won
2002	Havana Film Festival	OCIC Award	Common Ground	Won
2002	Havana Film Festival	Glauber Rocha Award	Common Ground	Won
2002	San Sebastián International Film Festival	Golden Seashell	Common Ground	Nominated
2002	San Sebastián International Film Festival	Best Screenplay	Common Ground	Won
2003	Argentine Film Critics Association Awards	Best Director	Common Ground	Nominated
2003	Argentine Film Critics Association Awards	Best Screenplay	Common Ground	Nominated
2003	Cinema Writers Circle Awards	Best Screenplay	Common Ground	Nominated
2003	Fribourg International Film Festival	Grand Prix Award	Common Ground	Nominated
2003	Fribourg International Film Festival	Audience Award	Common Ground	Won
2003	Goya Awards	Best Screenplay	Common Ground	Won
2003	Gramado Film Festival	Best Film	Common Ground	Nominated
2004	Cartagena Film Festival	Best Film	Common Ground	Nominated
2004	Havana Film Festival	Best Screenplay	Roma	Won
2004	Havana Film Festival	Audience Award	Roma	Won
2004	San Sebastián International Film Festival	Golden Seashell	Roma	Nominated
2005	Argentine Film Critics Association Awards	Best Director	Roma	Won
2005	Argentine Film Critics Association Awards	Best Screenplay	Roma	Nominated
2005	Goya Awards	Best Director	Roma	Nominated
2005	Goya Awards	Best Screenplay	Roma	Nominated
2005	Toulouse Cinespaña	Best Screenplay	Roma	Won
2005	Toulouse Cinespaña	Violette d"or	Roma	Won
