= José Pablo Feinmann =

Argentine philosopher (1943–2021)

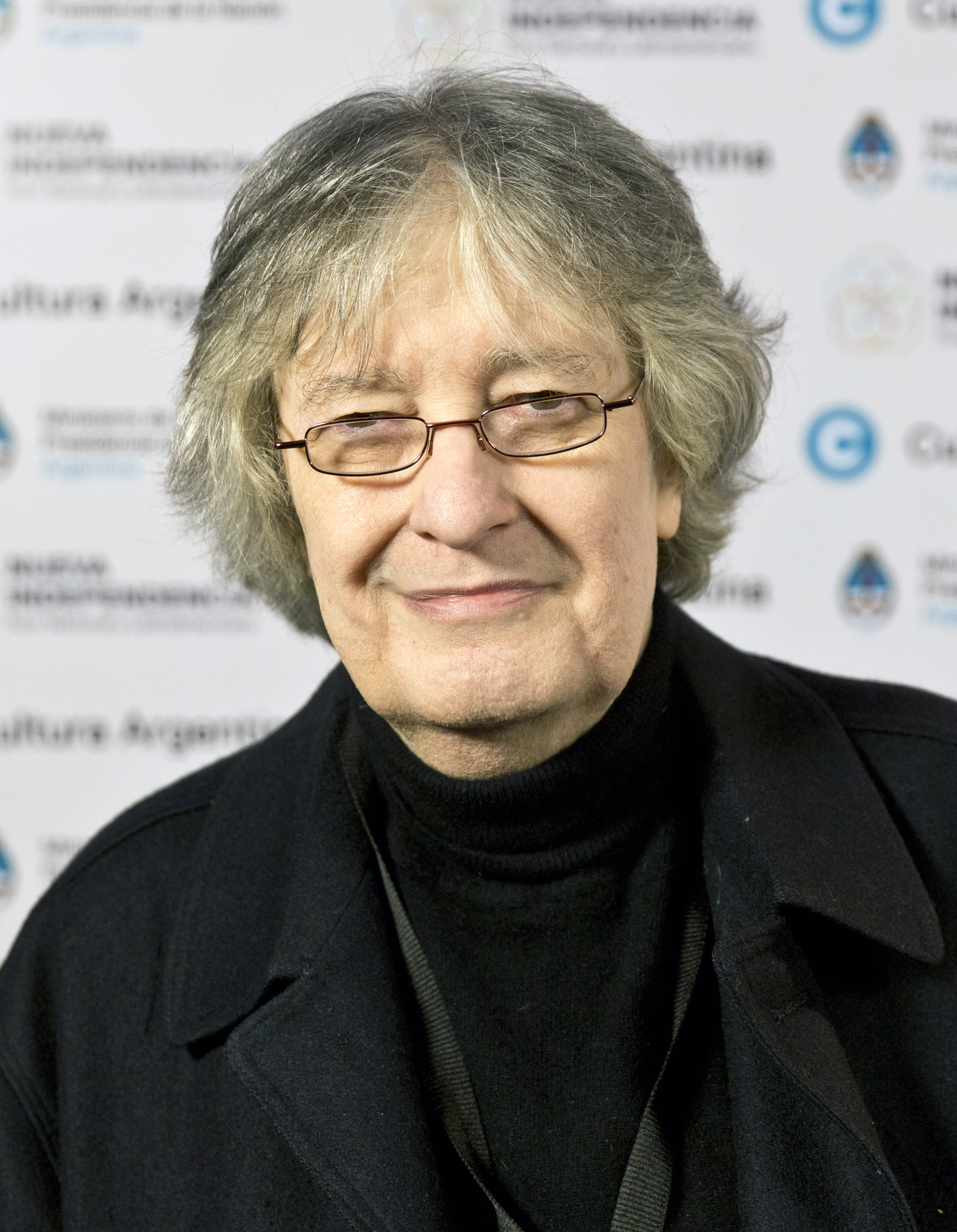
- José Pablo Feinmann in 2015
- Born: 29 March 1943; Buenos Aires, Argentina
- Died: 17 December 2021 (aged 78); Buenos Aires, Argentina
- Occupations: Writer playwright TV host
- Years active: 1970–2021
- Spouses: Marta Zavattaro (1966-1982); María Julia Bertotto (1988-)
- Children: Virginia and Verónica
- Website: Official Site

José Pablo Feinmann (29 March 1943 – 17 December 2021) was an Argentine writer, playwright, and television host. He also penned several screenplays for domestic film production and international coproductions.

Born to Abraham and Elena (de Albuquerque) Feinmann, Feinmann was a Peronist Youth militant during the 1970s, considering Peronism as a real mass movement with the potential to change the country for the better. Nevertheless, he opposed armed violence to achieve political ends, criticizing the foco theory of Che Guevara which, years after the Cuban Revolution, became popular in some sectors of the Marxist-Peronist movement, such as Montoneros.

Feinmann abandoned Peronism in the 1990s, during the neoliberal government of Carlos Menem. He later became a supporter of left-wing Peronist president Cristina Fernandez.

== Death ==
Feinmann died from complications of a stroke on 17 December 2021, at the age of 78.

== Works ==
=== Novels ===
- Últimos días de la víctima (1979)
- El ejército de ceniza (1986)
- La Astucia de la Razón (1990)
- El cadáver imposible (1992)
- Los crímenes de Van Gogh (1994)
- La sombra de Heidegger (2005)
- Timote: secuestro y muerte del general Aramburu (2009)
- Carter en New York (2009)
- Carter en Vietnam (2009)

=== Screenplays ===
- En retirada
- At the Edge of the Law
- Eva Perón: The True Story
- Ángel, la Diva y Yo
- El Amor y el Espanto
- Ay Juancito

=== TV ===
- El cine por asalto (2007)
- Cine contexto (2008–2010)
- Filosofía, aquí y ahora (2009– ?)
