= Rodrigo Grande =

Argentine film director and screenplay writer

Rodrigo Grande (born February 10, 1974, in Rosario, Santa Fe Province) is an Argentine film director and screenplay writer.

He works in the cinema of Argentina and in the cinema of Spain.

== Filmography ==
Writer and director

- La pared y la lluvia (1994)
- Juntos, in any way (1996)
- Rosarigasinos (2001) a.k.a. Presos del olvido a.k.a. Gangs from Rosario
- Cuestión de principios (2009) a.k.a. A Matter of Principles
- Al final del túnel (2016) a.k.a. At the End of the Tunnel

== Awards ==
Wins

- Huelva Latin American Film Festival: Special Jury Award – Best Picture (ree) – Best Actor – Intl Critics Mention, Rodrigo Grande; for: Rosarigasinos; 2001.
- Lleida Latin-American Film Festival: Best First Work, Rodrigo Grande; for: Rosarigasinos; 2002.
- Santo Domingo Film Festival: Ciguapa de Oro; Best Picture – Best Actor, Rodrigo Grande; for: Rosarigasinos; 2002.
- Los Angeles Latin Film Festival LALIFF: Best First Work, Rodrigo Grande; for: Rosarigasinos; 2001.
- Temecula Film Festival: Mention of Honor, Rodrigo Grande; for: Rosarigasinos; 2002.
- Condor Awards (Argentina): Best Music; for: Rosarigasinos; 2002.
- Mar del Plata International Film Festival: Best Actor - Best Music; for: Rosarigasinos; 2002.
- Festival de Cine Nacional de Pergamino (Argentina): Best Actor – Best Supporting Actress; for: Rosarigasinos; 2002.
- Festival de Cine Argentino de Olavarria (Argentina): Audience Award; for: Rosarigasinos; 2002.
- Huelva Latin American Film Festival: Best Picture; UPN Award, Rodrigo Grande; for: Cuestión de Principios; 2009.
- San Diego Latino Film Festival: Best Narrative Feature, Rodrigo Grande; for: Cuestión de Principios; 2010.
- Chicago Latino Film Festival: Audience Choice Award - Second Place; for: Cuestión de Principios; 2010.
- Los Angeles Latin Film Festival LALIFF: Best Script, Rodrigo Grande and Roberto Fontanarrosa; for: Cuestión de Principios; 2010.
- Fort Lauderdale International Film Festival 2010 (USA): Peoples Choice Award - Best Foreign Film; for: Cuestión de Principios; 2010.
- Sur Awards – Argentinian Academy of Motion Picture Arts and Science (ARG): Best Adapted Screenplay; for: Cuestión de Principios; 2010.
- Brussels International Fantastic Film Festival: Best Thriller, Rodrigo Grande; for: At The End of the Tunnel; 2017.
- Washington DC Film Festival: Best Feature Film (Audience Award), Rodrigo Grande; for: At The End of the Tunnel; 2017.
- Seattle International Film Festival: Best Feature Film & Best Director (Golden Space Needle Award - Audience Choice Award), Rodrigo Grande; for: At The End of the Tunnel; 2017.
- Pelikula Manila Spanish Film Festival 2017 : Best Feature Film (Audience Award), Rodrigo Grande; for: At The End of the Tunnel; 2017.
