= Emilio Kauderer =

Argentine musician

- Born: Argentina
- Occupations: Composer, conductor, orchestrator, songwriter
- Instrument: Piano

Emilio Kauderer is an Argentine composer, orchestrator and songwriter residing in Los Angeles. He is best known for his scores for films including "Metegol (Underdogs)", "Secret in Their Eyes", and "A Place In the World". Kauderer won a Latin Grammy for his work on Bajofondo's 2002 album "Bajofondo Tango Club".

== Early life and education ==
Kauderer was born in Argentina. He studied composition with Jacobo Ficher, and conducting with Jaques Bodmer. He performed as a classical pianist and trained at the Tchaikovsky Conservatory in Kyiv in piano playing, music composition and conducting with Sagaidachni and Kanershtein. Kauderer continued studies at Gnesina College of Music in Moscow and obtained a postgraduate degree at the Tchaikovsky Moscow Conservatory on a full merit scholarship with Naumov.

== Career ==
=== Works in Argentina ===
Upon his return to Argentina, his chamber compositions were performed by the Camerata Bariloche. Keuderer's Wind Quintet "Danzón" won the Yamaha-Promusica Award in 1987. He began work in Argentinian movies in 1980, composing for the film La Discoteca del amor, which was directed by Adolfo Aristarain.

=== Orchestral work ===
He received a fellowship to The Sundance Institute's Composer's Lab and was honored by being selected as the composer of the music for New York's Jewish Heritage Museum main exhibit piece. The musical Paquito's Christmas, written with Luis Avalos, was performed and conducted by Kauderer at the Washington Opera. The musical featured Plácido Domingo's grandson for three seasons and played at the Pasadena Civic Center in Los Angeles for nine years. Kauderer's symphonic work has been performed by the National Symphonic Orchestras in Argentina, Honduras, the La Porte Symphony Orchestra and the Pan American Symphony Orchestra in Washington.

Kauderer's orchestral work was performed by the Los Angeles Philharmonic at the Hollywood Bowl conducted by Gustavo Dudamel. Other orchestral work has been performed by the Washington Opera, the London Symphony Orchestra, the London Philharmonia Orchestra, the Prague Philharmonic, the Pan American Orchestra in Washington and the National Symphony Orchestras of both Argentina and Honduras.

Kauderer composed the music for the 60th anniversary of the Holiday on Ice show, Diamonds which was warmly received by European audiences for four years. He collaborated with Michael Kamen for the opening of the Winter Olympics, wrote the AT&T song for Jon Secada's performance at the Olympic Games in Seoul and wrote the music for Ricky Martin's videos for the Livin' la Vida Loca tour in collaboration with KC Porter.

=== Film scoring ===
In 2019, Kauderer became the first music composer to win the Molodist Award (Lifetime Achievement, Odesa Film Festival). (Past recipients include but are not limited to Roman Polanski, Catherine Deneuve, Sophia Loren and Claudia Cardinale.) Kauderer was honored with the Arbol de La Vida Award by the 2013 Guadalajara International Film Festival in Los Angeles (FICG in LA). The Los Angeles County Board of Supervisors granted Kauderer recognition for his outstanding contribution to film music. Kauderer was the recipient of a fellowship to The Sundance Institute's Composers Lab and the BMI Conductors Lab. He was honored by having been selected as the composer of the music for the main exhibit piece of New York's Jewish History Museum.

Kauderer composed the score for the remake of Secret in Their Eyes, directed by Billy Ray, and the 3D animated film Metegol/Futbolin/Underdogs, directed by Juan Campanella; Corazon de Leon, directed by Marcos Carnevale; and Amapola, directed by Eugenio Zanetti. Kauderer collaborated with director Juan Campanella on the soundtracks of Same Love, Same Rain, Vientos de Agua, El Hombre de tu Vida, The Secret in Their Eyes, co-composed with Federico Jusid, Belgrano and Parque Lezama. In collaboration with director Adolfo Aristarain, Kaudererwrote the music score for A Place in the World, Time for Revenge, Últimos días de la víctima and La Discoteca del Amor. To date, Kauderer has won three Academy Awards in Argentina for Best Film Score for the films: "Metegol/Underdogs," Secret in Their Eyes, and A Place In the World. Secret in Their Eyes won the Academy Award for Best Foreign Language Film in 2010.

=== TV work ===
Recent music credits for TV include the FOX series '2091', Familia en Venta and Cumbia Ninja. Kauderer collaborated with Stewart Copeland on the theme and music for the Emmy-nominated score of the Showtime series, Dead Like Me.

=== Video game work ===
Emilio Kauderer collaborated with Stewart Copeland in composing a song for the Stomp album and the soundtrack for the Spyro series of games on Sony's PlayStation 2.

=== Bajofondo ===
Kauderer participated in Bajofondo's Latin Grammy winning album Bajofondo Tango Club with his song "Maroma", produced by Gustavo Santaolalla and Juan Campodonico. The album was critically acclaimed in Argentina and sold well there and in record stores in Los Angeles. Universal Latino then released the album in the United States.

== Awards and nominations ==
- 2026 Nominated, ACE Awards for Best Score for "Empieza con D, Siete Letras" directed by Juan Campanella.

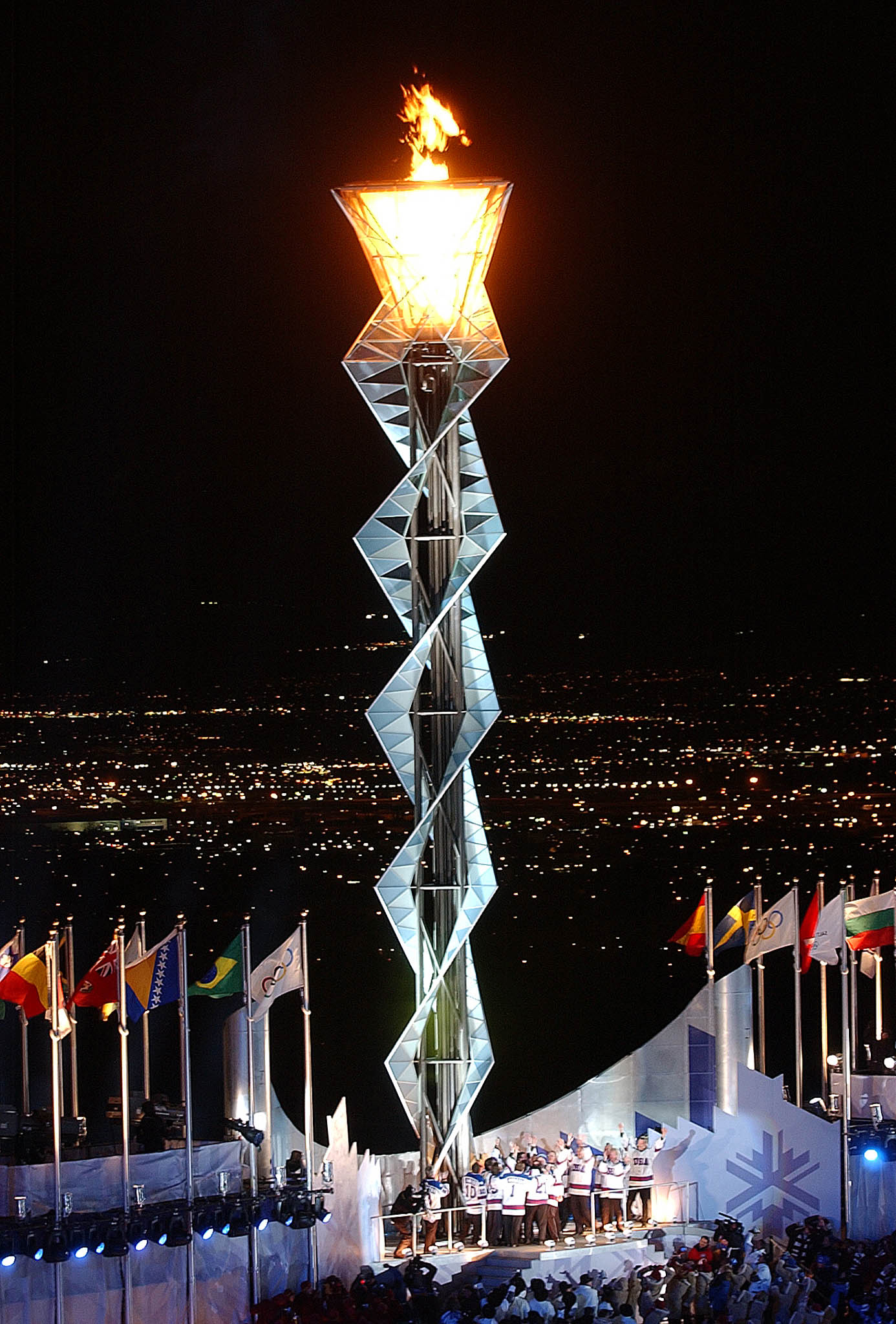
2002 Winter Olympics

- 2020 Nominated, Platino Awards for Best Score for "The Weasel's Tale"directed by Juan Campanella.
- 2020 Nominated, Premio Sur Awards for Best Score for "The Weasel's Tale" directed by Juan Campanella.
- 2019 Molodist Award [Lifetime Achievement]; first time Molodist given to music composer.
- 2019 Premio Sur Nomination for Best Score, composed in collaboration with Alejandro Kauderer for "My Masterpiece".
- 2014 Premio Platino (Panama) for Best Score for "Metegol".
- 2014 Condor de Plata (Nominated) for Best Score for "Metegol".
- 2013 Premio Sur (Academy Award in Argentina) for Best Score for "Metegol".
- 2013 Arbol de la Vida Award, a recognition by the Guadalajara International Film Festival in Los Angeles (FICG in LA).
- 2011 Clarin Nomination for Best Soundtrack, "El Hombre de tu Vida"
- 2010 Honored by the President of Argentina to conduct his film music with the National Symphony Orchestra at the closing of the Bicentennial of Argentina's Independence. The event took place in front of 1,5 million people.
- 2009 Clarin Award for Best Soundtrack (Argentina) "The Secret in their Eyes."
- 2009 Premio Sur for Best Soundtrack 2009 (Argentina), "The Secret in their Eyes."
- 2009 Condor de Plata Award 2010 for Best Soundtrack (Argentina), "The Secret in their Eyes."
- 2009 Nominated to the Goya Awards 2010 for Best Soundtrack (Spain), "The Secret in their Eyes."
- 2009 Festival Internacional del Nuevo Cine Latinoamericano for Best Soundtrack, "Miss Bala."
- 2009 Nominated for best soundtrack at the Goya Awards (Spain) "The Secret in their Eyes."
- 2008 Martin Fierro for Best Soundtrack, "Vientos de Agua."
- 2007 Clarin Award for Best Soundtrack, "Vientos de Agua."
- 2006 Kauderer was granted recognition by the Board of Supervisors of the County of Los Angeles.
- 2005 BMI fellowship to the Conductor's Lab.
- 2004 Emmy nomination for Best Score, composed in collaboration with Stewart Copeland. "Dead Like Me".
- 2003 Latin Grammy for his contribution to "Bajo Fondo Tango Club," produced by Gustavo Santaolalla and Juan Campodonico.
- 2003 Selected to compose the music for New York City's Museum of Tolerance main exhibit piece.
- 2002 Collaborated with Michael Kamen doing the music of the Opening for the 2002 Winter Olympics
- 2001 Sundance Institute fellowship to the Composer's Lab.
- 2001 "Paquito's Christmas," written with Luis Avalos, appears at the Washington Opera and the Pasadena Civic Center, sponsored by Plácido Domingo.
- 2000 Silver Condor (Critics Award in Argentina) for Best Soundtrack "El Mismo Amor, La Misma Lluvia".
- 1993 Premio Sur (Academy Award in Argentina) for Best Soundtrack "A Place in the World".
- 1993 Silver Condor (Critics Award in Argentina) for Best Soundtrack "A Place in the World".

== Filmography ==
- Como Cortar a Tu Patan (2017) – Composer
- Numb, at the Edge of the End (2017) – Composer
- Day of Reckoning (2016) – Composer
- 2091 (2016) – Composer
- Cumbia Ninja (2016) – Composer
- El Alien (2016) – Composer
- Secret in Their Eyes (2015) – Composer
- Underdogs (2015) – Composer
- Alice in Marialand (2014) – Composer
- Corazon de Leon (2013) – Composer
- Amapola (2013) – Composer
- Metegol (2013) – Composer
- Esclavo de Dios (2012) – Composer
- Border Run (2013) – Composer with Sebastian Kauderer
- Miss Bala (2011) – Composer
- El Hombre de tu Vida (2011) – in collaboration with Alejandro Kauderer
- Love Equation (2010) – Composer
- El secreto de sus ojos (2009) – in collaboration with Federico Jusid
- Verano amargo (2007) (in production)
- Vientos de agua (13 episodes, 2006)
- Adios momo (2006)
- 3:52 (2005)
- 2+2=5=1 (2004)
- Dead Like Me (7 episodes, 2003–2004)
- Te amaré en silencio (2003) TV Series
- Indigo (2003)
- Patriotas, Los (2002)
- Trysting (2001)
- Quantum Project (2000)
- El Mismo Amor, la Misma Lluvia (1999)
- Friends & Lovers (1999)
- Erasable You (1998)
- Asesinato a distancia (1998)
- Women: Stories of Passion (2 episodes, 1997)
- Playback (1996)
- Hot Line (1 episode, 1994)
- Tirano Banderas (1993)
- The Ice Runner (1993)
- Midnight Kiss (1993)
- Al filo de la ley (1992)
- Un lugar en el mundo (1992)
- Gypsy Eyes (1992)
- Prototype (1992)
- Julia Has Two Lovers (1991)
- Crack Me Up (1991)
- Palenque (1990)
- 15 Ugly Sisters (1990)
- Fistfighter (1989)
- Slash Dance (1989)
- They Call Me Macho Woman! (1989)
- In Dangerous Company (1988)
- Abierto de 18 a 24 (1988)
- Made in Argentina (1987)
- En busca del brillante perdido (1986)
- Bajo tierra (1985)
- Los Fierecillos indomables (1982)
- Plata dulce (1982)
- Últimos días de la víctima (1982)
- Tiempo de revancha (1981)
- Las Vacaciones del amor (1981)
- La Discoteca del amor (1980)
