= Javier Godino =

Spanish actor

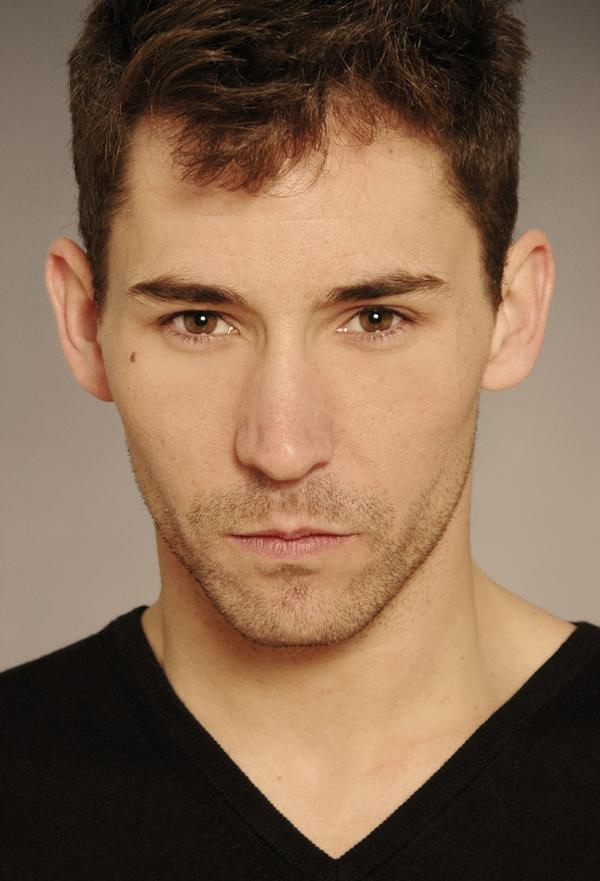
- Godino in 2011
- Born: 11 March 1978 (age 48); Madrid, Spain
- Occupation: Actor

Javier Godino (born 11 March 1978) is a Spanish actor.

== Biography ==
Godino began his studies at Juan Carlos Corazza's School of Interpretation. He is a Spanish actor, having worked in both Spanish and international cinematic productions, as well as musicals, theatre and television.

In 2009, he played an important role for his career, playing Isidoro Gomez in Juan José Campanella's film The Secret in Their Eyes, winner of the Academy Award for Best Foreign Language Film, where he shared the lead with Ricardo Darín and Soledad Villamil.

On stage, he was one of the protagonists in Nacho Cano's Hoy No Me Puedo Levantar, which opened in Madrid in April 2005, and went on to become Spain's longest running and highest selling musical. Godino's portrayal of the character of Colate received rave reviews.

For his role in the musical he was nominated by his peers for the Union de Actores de España award. For The Secret in Their Eyes he received a nomination to the 2010 Argentine Academy of Cinematography Arts and Sciences Awards. He has also worked alongside Hugh Jackman and Ewan McGregor in the Hollywood production Deception.

Godino has also made a name for himself as a singer. Working on Nacho Cano's projects he has recorded many songs. For the soundtrack of Hoy No Me Puedo Levantar he recorded the songs Perdido en mi habitación, Hoy no me puedo levantar, Barco a Venus and No es serio este cementerio. His voice also featured in Mecano medley which was used in Coca-Cola Light's television ad. In Nacho Cano's second musical A, Godino was also the lead and he went on to record three songs: Sin alma yo no hablo, El segundo grupo and Tu deber es volver. With Antonio Carmona he recorded El tango de los amantes with Argentine singer Graciela Giordano, Les feuilles mortes and Nostalgias. He created alongside Asier Acebo, his first music band "The Wyest".

In 2011 was released José Luis García Sánchez's movie Los muertos no se tocan, nene, based on a novel by Rafael Azcona. In May 2012, the Spanish-Argentine co-production Everyone Has a Plan starring Viggo Mortensen, Daniel Fanego, Sofía Gala and Soledad Villamil was released worldwide. The film was shot in the Paraná Delta near Buenos Aires.

He played the leading character in 2012 Los Dias no vividos by Lacaña Brothers and in 2014 telefilm Prim, el asesinato de la calle del Turco by Miguel Bardem playing the famous writer Benito Pérez Galdós.

He had a short supporting role on the Netflix show Borgia as Dionigi Di Naldo during 2nd and 3rd season, and also worked in Spanish TV.

He starred Pasaje de vida by Diego Corsini, filmed in Argentina and Spain with great reviews of his performance.

In 2016 will be released The Chosen, a Mexican-Spanish co-production by Antonio Chavarrías and Al final del túnel, an Argentine-Spanish produced film by Rodrigo Grande.

== Filmography ==
- 2023 – Sound of Freedom – Jorge
- 2021 – Lo Inevitable – Dir. Fercks Castellani
- 2019 - El silencio del pantano - Vicent
- 2016 – Ignacio de Loyola – Xanti
- 2016 – The Chosen -Dir. Antonio Chavarrías
- 2016 – Al final del túnel -Dir. Rodrigo Grande
- 2015 – Pasaje de vida -Dir. Diego Corsini
- 2012 – "Los días no vividos" -Dir. Alfonso Cortés-Cavanillas
- 2012 – Everybody Has a Plan – Dir. Ana Piterbarg
- 2011 – Los muertos no se tocan, nene – Dir. Jose Luis Garcia Sanchez
- 2011 – La voz dormida – Dir. Benito Zambrano
- 2009 – The Secret in Their Eyes – Dir. Juan José Campanella
- 2008 – Deception – Dir. Marcel Langeneger
- 2007 – Café solo o con ellas – Dir. Álvaro Díaz Lorenzo
- 2000 – Besos para todos – Dir. Jaime Chávarri

== Awards ==
- 2010 – Nominated for Newcomer Award for The Secret in Their Eyes, Spanish Actors Guild
- 2009 – Nominated for Best New Actor for The Secret in Their Eyes, Argentine Academy of Cinematography Arts and Sciences Awards
