= Eduardo Sacheri =

Argentine author and screenwriter

- Eduardo Sacheri in 2023
- Born: December 13, 1967 (age 58); Castelar
- Education: National University of Luján
- Occupations: screenwriter, historian, university teacher, writer, novelist, short story writer

Eduardo Alfredo Sacheri (born 13 December 1967 in Castelar) is an Argentine writer and professor of History, graduated in the National University of Luján. He is best known for his novel La pregunta de sus ojos which became the basis for the Oscar-winning film El secreto de sus ojos and its American remake. Sacheri co-wrote the film's script in collaboration with its director Juan Jose Campanella. Sacheri and Campanella were also the screenwriters of the animation film Underdogs. He also published a number of short stories, such as Esperándolo a Tito y otros cuentos de fútbol and Lo raro empezó después.

In 2016, Sacheri won the Premio Alfaguara for his novel La noche de la usina. The novel was later adapted for cinema as the film, Heroic Losers, directed by Sebastián Borensztein and co-written by Sacheri.

== Works ==
=== Novels ===
- La pregunta de sus ojos (2005)
- Aráoz y la verdad (2008)
- Papeles en el viento (2011)
- Ser feliz era esto (2014)
- La noche de la Usina (2016)
- Lo mucho que te amé (2019)
- Nosotros dos en la tormenta (2023)

=== Short story collections ===
- Esperándolo a Tito y otros cuentos de fútbol, AKA Los traidores y otros cuentos (2000). Contains 14 short stories
- Te conozco, Mendizábal y otros cuentos (2001). Contains 18 short stories
- Lo raro empezó después y otros cuentos (2003). Contains 19 short stories
- Un viejo que se pone de pie y otros cuentos (2007). Contains 14 short stories
- Los dueños del mundo (2012). Contains 17 short stories.
- La vida que pensamos. Cuentos de fútbol (2013). Contains 23 short stories

=== Nonfiction ===
Article collections

- Las llaves del reino (2015)
- El fútbol, de la mano (2017)
