= Vientos de agua =

- Genre: Drama
- Created by: Juan José Campanella (13 episodes); Juan Pablo Domenech (8 episodes); Alejo Flah (7 episodes); Aurea Martínez (6 episodes); Aída Bortnik (3 episodes)
- Directed by: Juan José Campanella
- Creative director: Juan José Campanella
- Composer: Emilio Kauderer
- Countries of origin: Argentina; Spain
- Original language: Spanish
- No. of seasons: 1
- No. of episodes: 13

Production
- Executive producer: Ricardo Freixa
- Producer: Juan Lovece
- Production locations: Asturias, Spain; Madrid, Spain; Buenos Aires, Argentina
- Cinematography: Miguel Abal; Félix Monti
- Editors: Camilo Antolini; Martino Zaidelis

Vientos de agua (Winds of Water) is a 2006 Argentine-Spanish mini TV series created by Juan José Campanella. The drama traces a Spaniard's emigration to Argentina in the 1930s, and, years later, his son's immigration to modern-day Spain. Through this arc, the series explores "...the differences and similarities between the immigration of early last century Europeans to here and now there". Through this metaphor of immigration, the lives of individuals are compared and found to have more in common than their differences.

Cultural differences between the target audiences are believed to have resulted in low ratings and the series was cancelled. The series aired initially in Spain in January 2006, on Telecinco. While it was a hit in Argentina, because of lower ratings in Spain, it was moved from the prime-time slot to 1 am, reducing its audience. It was eventually cancelled, possibly also due to downloading of series from the internet. The series achieved good DVD sales but, despite a campaign of support to continue into a second series, only one series of 13 episodes was produced.

The lower ratings in Spain are believed related in part to cultural values around appropriate management of linguistic differences between the linked but different cultures of Spain and Argentina. The Spanish audience rejected sub-titling whilst the Argentine audience rejected dubbing. In the event, the excellent production values were overridden by this cultural difference.

== Plot ==
The show begins in 1935 with the story of José Olaya (Ernesto Alterio), a 19-year-old anarchist from Asturias who works with his father and brother, Andrés, in a coal mine. One day, a gas leak occurs and Andrés asks the foreman to let the workers and children out. The foreman ignores his request. Andrés disobeys the order to return to work and instead helps evacuate the miners. While doing so he is severely wounded in a landslide. José and his father manage to take a dying Andrés back to his house, where he dies surrounded by his family. That same night, José decides to dynamite the mine in revenge and after doing so, he is followed by the Civil Guard. His mother asks him to go into exile in Argentina with the money saved by Andrés and to use his identity. José must keep his brother’s death a secret and will pretend to be Andrés for the rest of his life.

Concurrently, in 2001, the youngest son of an aging José (Héctor Alterio), Ernesto Olaya (Eduardo Blanco), is an unemployed architect in Buenos Aires who is suffering from the precursor to the economic crisis of that year. He decides to emigrate to Spain with his wife and children, but the Corralito, a bank restriction imposed by the government, blocked his bank deposits, preventing him from buying four plane tickets. However, his father offers him enough money to travel alone. Ernesto moves to Madrid, where he meets Ana (Marta Etura), a twenty-something year old waitress who helps him settle into a shared apartment with Mara (Angie Cepeda), a young illegal immigrant from Colombia. Ernesto watches how his plans of progress crumble in the midst of a slow Spanish bureaucracy. His progress is also deterred by the restrictions and xenophobia suffered by immigrants. Despite this, he lies to his family about his true situation, making them believe that he lives alone and with good job expectations.

Returning to the past, José embarks on his journey to Argentina, meeting Julius Lazlo (Pablo Rago), a young Hungarian Jew and Gemma (Francesca Trentacarlini/Giulia Michelini), a nine-year-old Italian girl who lost her family. Together they are placed in a tenement in the La Boca neighborhood. The plot continues during the 1940s and 1950s, showcasing José dealing with the outbreak of the Spanish Civil War, the love story between Julius and Gemma, and the political landscape of Argentina during Peronism. In addition, it shows José’s relationship with the different women in his life, like his first wife Sophie (Caterina Murino) and his second wife, Lucía (Valeria Bertuccelli), who ends up being Ernesto's mother.

For his part, Ernesto temporarily gets an illegal job in an architects' studio. Due to his lack of sincerity and the long separation from his family, irritations begin to emerge between Ernesto and his wife Cecilia (Claudia Fontán), who begins an extramarital relationship with a colleague at work. At the end of the series, Cecilia and Ernesto divorce. Ernesto then begins to have feelings for his roommate Mara, and they end up getting married and having a child together.

Finally, in 2005, Ernesto — who already enjoys dual nationality and stable work as an architect — and his father visit Asturias. While there, José meets the ghosts of his past. He considers killing the foreman who sent his brother to the mine 70 years ago but has a change of heart. He begins taking actions to commit suicide to be with the friends that he lost. However, he reconsiders and realizes that he still has a life in the present. The series ends with Ernesto and his father sitting in front of Andrés’s grave, where José finally reveals his big secret to him.

== Cast ==
=== Main ===
- Ernesto Alterio as Andrés Olaya (13 episodes)
- Eduardo Blanco as Ernesto Olaya (13 episodes)
- Héctor Alterio as Andrés Olaya (13 episodes)

=== Other cast ===
- Pablo Rago as Juliusz (12 episodes)
- Angie Cepeda as Mara (11 episodes)
- Marta Etura as Ana (10 episodes)
- Giulia Michelini as Gemma (9 episodes)
- Carlos Kaspar as Illie (8 episodes)
- Claudia Fontán as Cecilia (7 episodes)
- Pilar Punzano as Laia (6 episodes)
- Bárbara Goenaga as Felisa (6 episodes)
- Caterina Murino as Sophie (6 episodes)
- Rubén Ochandiano as Vidal (6 episodes)

The protagonist trio is composed of Argentine actors who also have dual nationality in Spain. Ernesto Alterio plays José Olaya between the ages of 19 and 43, while his father in real life, Héctor Alterio, plays José between the ages of 86 and 90. Although the two actors did not share any scenes, they were together while filming. Héctor Alterio remarked that he found working with his son to be “very fun” and that “family codes” inevitably emerged from it. He also spoke about the series and said that as a story, it “conveys emotion, goodness, and fundamentally, entertainment. It is a pleasure to work with [José] Campanella. It is an offer that you accept with your eyes closed.” The trio is completed by Eduardo Blanco, who plays Ernesto Olaya, José’s son. This was the fourth production that Blanco and director Campanella worked on together.

The cast of 19th century characters is composed by Argentine actors Pablo Rago - who plays Julius Lazlo -, and Valeria Bertuccelli, who plays Lucía. Italian actresses Francesca Trentacarlini and Giulia Michelini play Gemma, the former playing her at age nine and the latter from age 14. This cast also includes Caterina Murino, who previously played Solange, one of the Bond girls from Casino Royale. Many Spanish actors also appear in the series. Rubén Ochandiano plays the young anarchist Vidal, Pilar Punzano plays young immigrant Laia, Bárbara Goenaga plays José’s sister Felisa, Silvia Abascal as José’s first love Henar, and Susi Sánches as José’s mother.

As for the 21st century cast, San Sebastian native Marta Etura appeared as Ana, Carlos Kaspar as Romanian immigrant Illie, and Colombian Angie Cepeda as Mara. Claudia Fontán plays Ernesto's wife, while Mariano Bertolini and Manuela Pal play their children Tomás and Alicia. In the last chapters Javier, a character played by El Gran Wyoming, makes an appearance.
