= Same Love, Same Rain =

El mismo amor, la misma lluvia
- Theatrical release poster
- Directed by: Juan José Campanella
- Written by: Juan José Campanella; Fernando Castets
- Produced by: Jorge Estrada Mora
- Starring: Ricardo Darín; Soledad Villamil; Ulises Dumont; Eduardo Blanco
- Cinematography: Daniel Shulman
- Edited by: Camilo Antolini
- Music by: Emilio Kauderer
- Production companies: JEMSA; Warner Bros. Pictures
- Distributed by: Warner Bros. Pictures
- Release date: September 16, 1999 (Argentina)
- Running time: 113 minutes
- Countries: Argentina; United States
- Language: Spanish

Same Love, Same Rain (Spanish: El mismo amor, la misma lluvia) is a 1999 Argentine-American romantic comedy film directed by Juan José Campanella and written by Campanella and Fernando Castets. It stars Ricardo Darín, Soledad Villamil, Ulises Dumont and Eduardo Blanco.

== Plot ==
In 1980, Jorge Pellegrini (Ricardo Darín), a young and talented Argentine writer, upon returning from a trip to Europe, is forced to write short love stories for "Cosas", a local, light-themed magazine, to aid his dire financial situation. His boss and best friend, Roberto (Eduardo Blanco), constantly censors Jorge's stories, by deciding which parts to take out or which stories not to print. Jorge's friend and mentor, Mastronardi, often visits the magazine HQ asking Roberto for work, but due to his history of courageous confrontation against the last military dictatorship in Argentina, he finds himself blacklisted and therefore cannot find work.

In the showing of a short film, based on a story by Jorge, he meets Laura (Soledad Villamil), a passionate, beautiful and charming young girl who works as a waitress in a restaurant. He is instantly smitten by her, and she gives him the custom matchbook of the restaurant she works at, saying is her card. Days after, he receives news of the death of Mastronardi, and begins to write a story about his deceased friend. However, he experiences writer's block, and cannot get around to finish it. Jorge then finds the matchbook Laura gave him and decides to go the restaurant where she is a waitress. They go on a date to a bar, and they display chemistry and understanding, and Laura reveals that she has a boyfriend, an artist on a tour in Uruguay. Things go awry when the police raid the place and take Laura and a group of people who could not show their documents to jail, to be investigated as part of the military operations to maintain the social order during Argentina's dirty war. Jorge is taken to jail himself after trying to help Laura. Upon their release, Laura and Jorge spend more and more time together, and Jorge reveals his feelings for Laura. She then tells him that she currently does not reciprocate, but she will call him if she "figures out any context" in which she could.

Months go by and Jorge buries himself in his work, starts a diary (which he then throws away) and loses hope of receiving Laura's phone call. However, she then calls him and they arrange a date, at which she reveals that she wanted to be sure of not waiting for her boyfriend anymore before starting a new relationship. They kiss, have sex and start a relationship. The first months are full of romance and passion; however, when Laura decides to quit her job to work for free at a local radio station, Jorge begins to lose interest in her, and is constantly bothered by the monotony of their relationship. To make matters worse, Laura has decided to make a great writer out of Jorge, and constantly pressures him to stop writing the short and simple-minded love stories and focus on a powerful book.

When Jorge reaches the breaking point and cannot stand the current status of his relationship with Laura, he cheats on her with a girl he meets at the magazine (Carola). Laura finds out and leaves him immediately. Jorge, once again, buries himself in his work for two years, until he receives news from Roberto that, due to a new format, the magazine will no longer publish his stories. However, he is offered a job as the movie and theatre critic of the magazine, which he angrily refuses. He then finds the inspiration to finish Mastronardi's story and take it to the theatre. However, the play is a failure, and because of the effort and money he put in it, Jorge is heartbroken. Laura goes to see the play, but he avoids her. After the closing of the play, Jorge receives an emotional visit from Mastronardi's spirit in a dream, who asks him to look after his son, Sebastián.

In 1987, things have changed: Jorge has accepted the job offer as the movie and theatre critic, and Roberto is engaged to Marita, a friend of Laura's whom he met in a double date set by Jorge and Laura years before. Jorge is in a relationship with a new girl; however, he finds himself shocked when he receives news that Laura is to be married to her old boyfriend. This prompts Jorge to track Laura and, after spending a day together, they have sex, and Laura then decides that she will get married anyway.

Once again, years go by, and in the 1990s, a bitter and disillusioned Jorge, still works as a critic. However, due to his failures and disappointments, and to the loss of his spirit and morals, we learn that he now asks for money in return for writing favorable reviews. This works against him when Laura, one of the producers of the movie he asked money to write a favorable review for, personally delivers him the money, and looks at him with disgust.

One day at the office, due to a disagreement, veteran political journalist Márquez (Ulises Dumont) has a heated exchange with his boss, young Micky (Rodrigo de la Serna) and is fired. This then prompts Sebastián, Mastronardi's son, to blame Jorge for his father's death. Unable to cope with guilt, and after realizing how much he has changed, Jorge attempts suicide. This attempt, however, is frustrated by Roberto, who arrives just in time to save him. After the suicide attempt, there is a surprise party, at which the employees of Cosas decide to donate one twelfth of their salaries to Márquez. Laura and Jorge meet once again, and share a long talk about their lives, hopes and crushed dreams.

The movie ends with a hint that Jorge and Laura will give their relationship one last chance. Jorge, reinvigorated, and looking like a happy man for the first time in years, watches her taxi depart with a broad smile. He is then greeted by his friends, Márquez, Sebastián and Roberto, and tells them of the new love story he is planning to write.

== Cast ==
- Ricardo Darín as Jorge Pellegrini
- Soledad Villamil as Laura Ramallo
- Ulises Dumont as Márquez
- Eduardo Blanco as Roberto
- Graciela Tenenbaum as Marita
- Alfonso De Grazia as Mastronardi
- Alicia Zanca as Sonia
- Mariana Richaudeau as Leticia
- Alejandro Buzzoni as Sebastián
- Rodrigo de la Serna as Micky

== Background ==
The film is the first of a trilogy that follows protagonist (Ricardo Darín) and his best friend (Eduardo Blanco) through a series of reevaluations regarding their lives. The films include: El hijo de la novia (2001) and Luna de Avellaneda (2004).

== Distribution ==
The film was wide released in Argentina on September 16, 1999.

It was screened at various film festivals, including: the Valladolid International Film Festival, Spain; the Gramado Film Festival, Brazil; the Oslo Films from the South Festival, Norway; the San Diego Latino Film Festival, San Diego, United States; and others.

== Awards ==
=== Wins ===
- Valladolid International Film Festival: Youth Jury Award Meeting Point Section, Juan José Campanella; 1999.
- Argentine Film Critics Association Awards: Silver Condor; Best Actor, Ricardo Darín; Best Actress, Soledad Villamil; Best Art Direction/Production Design, María Julia Bertotto; Best Cinematography, Daniel Shulman; Best Director, Juan José Campanella; Best Film, Best Original Screenplay, Juan José Campanella and Fernando Castets; Best Supporting Actor, Eduardo Blanco; 2000.
- Gramado Film Festival: Golden Kikito; Best Supporting Actor, Ulises Dumont; 2000.
- Oslo Films from the South Festival: Audience Award, Juan José Campanella; 2000.

=== Nominations ===
- Argentine Film Critics Association Awards: Silver Condor, Best Editing, Camilo Antolini; Best Music, Emilio Kauderer; Best New Actor, Eduardo Blanco; Best New Actress, Graciela Tenenbaum; Best Supporting Actor, Ulises Dumont; 2000.
- Gramado Film Festival: Golden Kikito, Best Film, Juan José Campanella; 2000.
- 22nd Moscow International Film Festival: Golden St. George, Juan José Campanella; 2000.
