= Delirium (2014 film) =

- Argentine theatrical release poster
- Directed by: Carlos Kaimakamian Carrau
- Written by: Carlos Kaimakamian Carrau
- Starring: Ricardo Darín; Miguel Di Lemme; Ramiro Archain; Emiliano Carrazzone
- Music by: Diego Monk
- Distributed by: United International Pictures
- Release date: October 2, 2014 (Argentina)
- Running time: 85 minutes
- Country: Argentina
- Language: Spanish

Delirium is a 2014 Argentine film, starring Ricardo Darín in a meta fictional role.

== Plot ==
A group of 3 friends try to earn a lot of money quickly. After considering several options, they try to make a short film. They manage to get in contact with the famous actor Ricardo Darín (who plays himself in the movie), who mistook one of them as a relative of one of his friends, and agreed to work with them because of the misunderstanding. The group starts to film, and attempts to drive a car slowly towards Darín while filming; but the untrained driver accelerated instead of stopping the car, and killed him.

The three friends escaped, and all the media was filled with people asking for the whereabouts of Darín. They arranged some portions of the unreleased short film to make it seem as if Darín was leaving the country, which led to a national outrage. They tried to use a similar system to stage a request of a million dollars to the producers of his last film; those producers denounced that Darín had been kidnapped. This led to a complete national crisis, and the US threatened to start bombing Buenos Aires if Darín did not appear alive.

== Production ==
Delirium is the first film of director Carlos Kaimakamian Carrau. It was released when Wild Tales, another film featuring Darín, was still in theaters.

The film also features TV host Susana Giménez as the president of Argentina, who makes a speech during an emergency population warning. Giménez, who had been a film actress in the past, had not worked in other films in the previous five years.

== Cast ==
- Ricardo Darín as himself
- Miguel Di Lemme as Federico
- Ramiro Archain as Martín
- Emiliano Carrazzone as Mariano
- Susana Giménez as the president of Argentina
- Diego Torres as himself
- Catalina Dlugi as herself
- Débora Pérez Volpin as herself
- Sergio Lapegüe as himself
- Germán Paoloski as himself
