= Ricardo Darín =

Argentine actor, director and producer (born 1957)

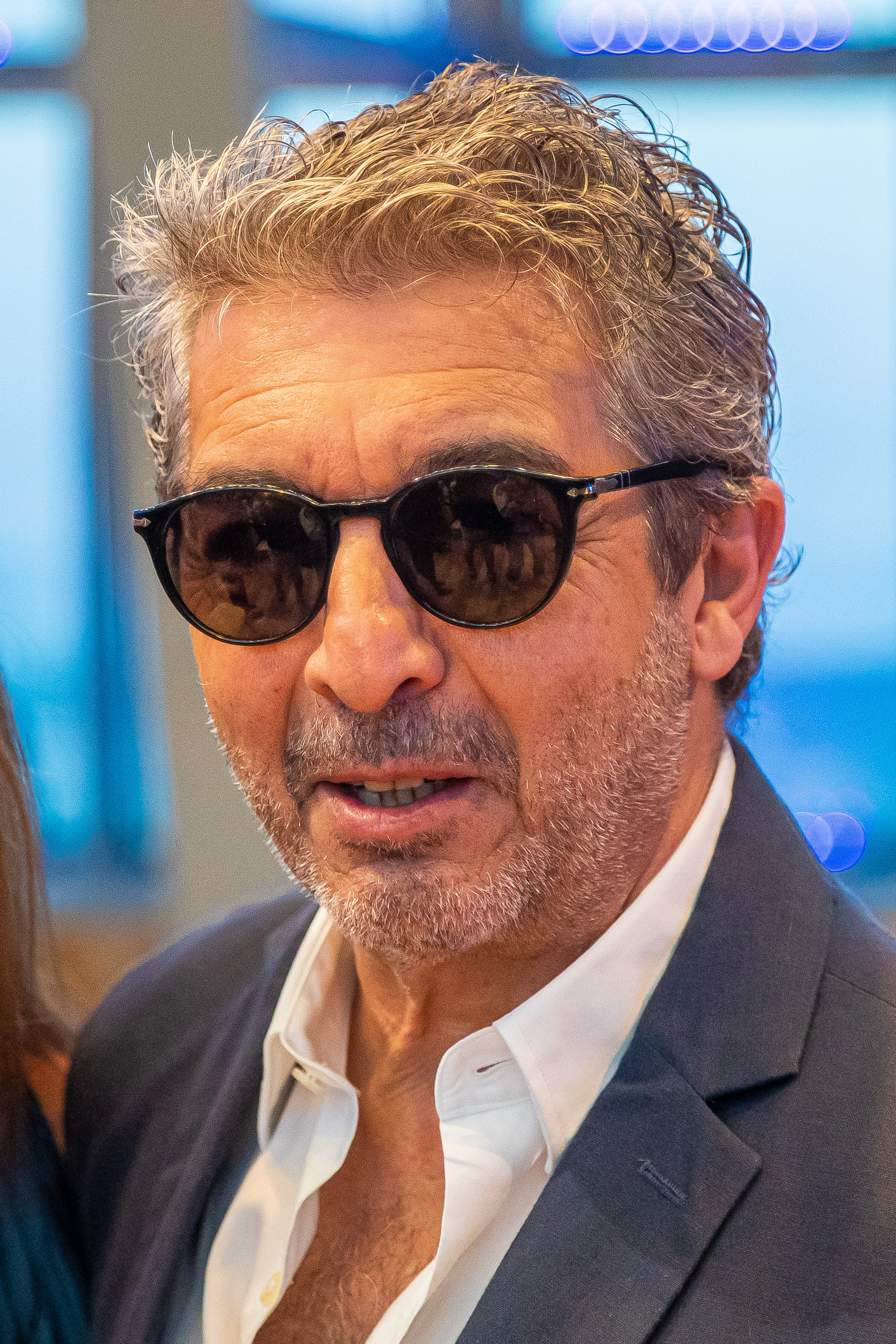
- Ricardo Darín, April 2023
- Born: Ricardo Alberto Darín; 16 January 1957 (age 69); Buenos Aires, Argentina
- Occupations: Actor; film director; film producer
- Years active: 1967–present
- Spouse: Florencia Bas (m. 1988)
- Children: 2, including Chino
- Mother: Roxana Darín

Ricardo Alberto Darín (born 16 January 1957) is an Argentine actor, film director and film producer, considered one of the best and most prolific actors of Argentine cinema.

Considered one of the greatest and most acclaimed movie stars of his country, he played several parts in TV series for several years where he became popular as a young leading actor. His most prominent roles as a film actor include Nine Queens (2000), Son of the Bride (2001), Moon of Avellaneda (2004), The Aura (2005) and The Signal (2007), which was also his directorial debut.

He starred in the Academy Award winning film for Best Foreign Picture The Secret in Their Eyes (2009). In 2011, the Konex Foundation bestowed upon him their Diamond Award, one of the most prestigious awards in Argentina, for being the most important personality in entertainment in the last decade in his country. In 2015, he received the Goya Award for Best Actor for the film Truman.

== Early life ==
Darín was born in Buenos Aires, Argentina, on 16 January 1957, to actor Ricardo Darín Sr. and actress Renée Roxana. His family is of Italian and Lebanese origin, and has held strong ties to the Argentine showbusiness community. His parents divorced in 1969 when he was 12 years old, and his father died of cancer on 5 January 1989.

== Career ==
=== Early years ===
Darín was 10 years old when he made his theater debut alongside his parents. By the age of 16 he had achieved a stable position in television in Argentina, in TV shows such as Alta comedia and Estación Retiro, under the patronage of Alberto Migré, Argentina's major TV producer at the time.

=== TV success (1980s) ===
During the 1980s, while still collaborating with Migré, Darín was acclaimed as one of the galancitos (Spanish for "charmers"), a group of young actors that adapted popular TV programs into theater productions. The galancitos were very popular all over Argentina. In 1987, Darín starred in the television show Estrellita mía, with Andrea Del Boca, and two years later in the show Rebelde, with Grecia Colmenares.

He switched to comedy in the early 1990s, which led to his greatest television success co-starring in the remake of the 1970s TV show Mi cuñado (1993–1996), alongside Luis Brandoni.

=== Film success (1990s) ===
Despite his success on television, Darín never left theater and continued to perform in productions such as La extraña pareja (a Spanish adaptation of Neil Simon's The Odd Couple) (1984), Taxi (1985), Sugar (1986–1987), Rumores (1990), Algo en común (1995) and Art (1997–1999). He debuted as a theater director in 1990, with the production Pájaros in the nait, starring Adrián Suar, Diego Torres and Leonardo Sbaraglia.

He started his film career by appearing in films mainly aimed for young audiences, such as He nacido en la ribera, Así es la vida, La rabona and Los éxitos del amor, La carpa del amor, La discoteca del amor and La canción de Buenos Aires. He then shifted to more mature roles, which permitted him to appear in films such as El desquite, Revancha de un amigo and La Rosales.

The critics first noted and praised Darín for his role in the film Perdido por perdido, directed by the newcomer Alberto Lecchi. He then appeared in Eduardo Mignogna's The Lighthouse (El faro in Spanish), and starred in Juan José Campanella's Same Love, Same Rain (El mismo amor, la misma lluvia in Spanish), which brought him further critical acclaim. But his success in the film was established by his role as Marcos, a con artist amid Argentina's financial crisis, in the 2000 film Nine Queens (Nueve Reinas in Spanish), in which he starred alongside Gastón Pauls.

=== International acknowledgement (2000s) ===
After the success of Nine Queens, Darín played a minor role in Mignona's La fuga (The Escape), in 2001. In that same year, he co-starred in Son of the Bride (El hijo de la novia), alongside Norma Aleandro and Héctor Alterio. The film was a commercial and critical success, resulting in its nomination for an Academy Award for Best Foreign Language Film and its winning the Silver Condor Award for Best Film.

Darín then starred in the comedy film Samy y yo, with Angie Cepeda, in 2002. He also starred with Cecilia Roth in Kamchatka, a drama that was Argentina's official submission for the 2002 Academy Award for Best Foreign Language Film, but it was not nominated by the Academy.

In 2004 he co-starred with actress Mercedes Morán in the film Moon of Avellaneda (Luna de Avellaneda), in which he played a man trying to save his childhood club from bankruptcy. In 2005 he portrayed a taxidermist with a photographic memory who unknowingly gets himself involved in a crime scheme in the film The Aura. This last performance earned him an Argentine Film Critics Association Silver Condor Award for Best Actor and a Clarín Award for Best Actor.

In 2006 he and Juan José Campanella were awarded Spanish citizenship by certificate of naturalization, a special concession given by the Kingdom of Spain to people of particular merit. That same year, he starred in the Spanish film The Education of Fairies (La educación de las hadas), alongside Bebe and Irène Jacob.

In 2007 he appeared in the film XXY, where he plays the troubled father of an intersex teenage daughter. That same year, he starred and debuted as a film director in the film La señal (The Signal), a project Eduardo Magnogna left unfinished after his death.

In 2009 he starred with Soledad Villamil and Guillermo Francella in The Secret in Their Eyes (El secreto de sus ojos), a film by Juan José Campanella. The film won the Academy Award for Best Foreign Language Film and was the second biggest box-office hit in the history of Argentine cinema. His performance as Benjamín Espósito earned Darín a second Silver Condor Award for Best Actor and his first nomination for the Goya Award in that same category.

Also in 2009 he appeared in the Spanish film El baile de la Victoria, which earned him a nomination for the Goya Award, this time as Best Actor in a Supporting Role.

=== Continued success (2010s) ===
In 2010 he starred in Pablo Trapero's Carancho, with Martina Gusmán, where he played the role of an unscrupulous lawyer.

In 2011, along with Muriel Santa Ana and Ignacio Huang, he starred in Sebastián Borensztein's successful Chinese Take-Away (Un cuento chino). That same year he was awarded two Konex Awards: the Platinum Konex for Best Actor, and the Bright Konex for the Most Influential Figure in Argentine Show Business in the 2001–2010 Decade.

In 2012 he starred in White Elephant (Elefante blanco), again along with Martina Gusmán. The following year he starred in the box-office hits Tesis sobre un homicidio (Thesis on a Homicide) and 7th Floor (Séptimo).

In 2013 he returned to the theater and starred in the play Escenas de la vida conyugal (a Spanish adaptation of Ingmar Bergman's Scenes from a Marriage), alongside Valeria Bertuccelli. In 2015 he reprised the role with Érica Rivas, in Mar del Plata. His performance earned him the Sea Star (Estrella de Mar) Award for Best Actor in a Dramatic Comedy.

In 2014 he starred in Wild Tales (Relatos salvajes), the biggest box-office hit in Argentine cinema history, along with Leonardo Sbaraglia, Oscar Martínez, Érica Rivas, Rita Cortese, Darío Grandinetti and Julieta Zylberberg. This was his third film to get nominated for an Academy Award. His performance earned him his third nomination for the Goya Awards, this time in the Best Actor category.

In 2015 he starred in Cesc Gay's Truman, which earned him a Concha de Plata award for Best Actor at the San Sebastián International Film Festival.

=== Recent work (2020s) ===
In 2022, he starred in Argentina, 1985 as Julio César Strassera, who served as Chief Prosecutor during the Trial of the Juntas in 1985.

As of 2023, Darín has starred in the four films that have been nominated for the Academy Award for Best International Feature Film in representation of Argentina in the 21st century: Son of the Bride (2001), The Secret in Their Eyes (2009), Wild Tales (2014) and Argentina, 1985.

Darín stars as Juan Salvo in The Eternaut, a TV series for Netflix based on the comic of the same name.

== Personal life ==
In 1988, Darín married fellow Argentine Florencia Bas, with whom he has two children, Chino and Clara. His younger sister, Alejandra Darín, was an actress. In February 2026, he became a grandfather when his son Chino and his partner of ten years, Spanish actress Úrsula Corberó, welcomed their first child, a boy named Dante.

Darín rejected the opportunity to play a drug trafficker in the Denzel Washington film Man on Fire, as he disapproved of Hollywood's negative stereotyping of Latin Americans.

In 2016, Ricardo Darín became a patron of DreamAgo, an international screenwriters association.

== Roles in Academy Award-nominated films ==
Ricardo Darín has been in four pictures that have been nominated for an Academy Award for Best Foreign Language Film/International Feature Film:

- Son of the Bride (2001), directed by Juan José Campanella
- The Secret in Their Eyes (2009), directed by Juan José Campanella
- Wild Tales (2014); segment: "Bombita", directed by Damián Szifron
- Argentina, 1985 (2022), directed by Santiago Mitre

The Second of these films won the award at the 82nd Academy Awards. All of these films have been submitted to the awards by Argentina.

All four films are also, to date, the only Argentine films of the 21st century to have been nominated for the Academy Award.

== Filmography ==
=== Film ===
Year	Title	Role	Notes
1969	La culpa	Federico Ramírez	
1979	La playa del amor		
1979	Juventud sin barreras		
1979	La carpa del amor	Eddie Ulmer	
1980	La discoteca del amor		
1980	The Song of Buenos Aires		
1981	Abierto día y noche		
1983	El desquite		
1984	La Rosales		
1986	Expreso a la emboscada		
1986	Te amo		
1987	The Stranger	Clark Whistler	
1987	Revancha de un amigo		
1993	Perdido por perdido	Vidal	
1998	The Lighthouse	Andy	
1999	Same Love, Same Rain	Jorge	
2000	Nine Queens	Marcos	
2001	Son of the Bride	Rafael Belvedere	
2001	La fuga	Domingo "El Pibe" Santaló	
2002	Kamchatka	Dad, David Vincent	
2002	Samy y yo	Samy	
2004	Moon of Avellaneda	Román Maldonado	
2005	The Aura	Esteban Espinosa	
2006	The Education of Fairies	Nicolas	
2007	XXY	Néstor Kraken	
2007	La señal	Corvalán	
2009	The Secret in Their Eyes	Benjamín Espósito	
2009	El baile de la Victoria	Vergara Grey	
2010	Carancho	Sosa	
2011	Chinese Take-Away	Roberto	
2012	White Elephant	Julián	
2012	A Gun in Each Hand	G.	
2013	Tesis sobre un homicidio	Roberto Bermúdez	
2013	7th Floor	Sebastián Roberti	
2013	Cinco segundos antes de morir		
2014	Wild Tales	Simón Fisher	
2014	Delirium	Himself	
2014	Torrente 5: Operación Eurovegas	Himself	Cameo
2015	Truman	Julián	
2016	Kóblic	Captain Tomás Kóblic	
2017	Black Snow	Salvador	
2017	The Summit	Hernán Blanco	
2018	Everybody Knows	Alejandro	
2018	An Unexpected Love	Marcos	
2019	Heroic Losers	Fermín Perlassi	
2022	Argentina, 1985	Julio César Strassera	

=== Television ===
Year	Title	Role	Notes
1968	La pandilla del tranvía		
1969	Testimonios de hoy...		Episode: "La carta"
1969	Abelardo Pardales		Episode: "La carta"
1970	Las grandes novelas		Episode: "Tiempos difíciles"
1974	Alta comedia		Episode: "Ayer fue primavera"
1975	Ayer fue mentira		
1975–1976	La familia Super Star		
1977	Pablo en nuestra piel	Bruno	
1977	El tema es el amor		
1978	Vos y yo, toda la vida	Federico	
1979	Una escalera al cielo	Tito	
1980	Casa de muñecas	Ivar Helmer	
1980	Un día 32 en San Telmo	Fernando	
1981	Me caso con vos	Ricardo	
1982	El conventillo de la Paloma		
1982–1983	Nosotros y los miedos		
1983	Mi chanta favorito		
1983	Compromiso		Episode: "Adopción"
1984	Historia de un trepador		
1984	Cuentos para ver		Episode: "Esa mujer"
1984	Galas de teatro		
1984–1985	Los exclusivos del 11		
1987	Estrellita mía	Juan José "Juanjo"	
1990	Rebelde	Álex Alonso	
1991	Buenos Aires, háblame de amor	Bruno Santoro	
1992	Mi otro yo	The Driver	
1993	Mi cuñado	Federico "Chiqui" Fornari	
1995	Poliladron		
1996	Mi cuñado	Federico "Chiqui" Fornari	
1998	Chiquititas	Eduardo	
1999	La mujer del presidente	Agustín Moyano	
2000	Tiempo final	Juan	
2000	Por ese palpitar		
2010	Para vestir santos		
2025	The Eternaut	Juan Salvo	

== Awards and nominations ==
Year	Award	Category	Nominated work	Result
1993	Martín Fierro Awards	Leading Actor in a Comedy Program	Mi cuñado	Nominated
1994	Martín Fierro Awards	Leading Actor in a Comedy Program	Mi cuñado	Won
1995	Martín Fierro Awards	Leading Actor in a Comedy Program	Mi cuñado	Nominated
1996	Martín Fierro Awards	Leading Actor in a Comedy Program	Mi cuñado	Nominated
1998	Martín Fierro Awards	Leading Actor in a Comedy Program	Mi cuñado	Nominated
1999	Martín Fierro Awards	Leading Actor in a Drama Program	La mujer del presidente	Won
2000	Silver Condor Awards	Best Actor	Same Love, Same Rain	Won
2000	Clarín Awards	Best Actor	Nine Queens	Won
2001	Silver Condor Awards	Best Actor	Nine Queens	Won
2001	Biarritz Film Festival	Best Actor	Nine Queens	Won
2001	Clarín Awards	Best Actor (Film)	Son of the Bride	Won
2002	CEC Awards	Best Actor	Son of the Bride	Nominated
2002	Sant Jordi Awards	Best Foreign Actor	Son of the Bride	Won
2002	Sant Jordi Awards	Best Foreign Actor	Nine Queens	Won
2002	Silver Condor Awards	Best Actor	Son of the Bride	Won
2003	Silver Condor Awards	Best Actor	Kamchatka	Nominated
2004	Valladolid International Film Festival	Best Actor	Moon of Avellaneda	Won
2004	Clarín Awards	Best Actor (Film)	Moon of Avellaneda	Nominated
2005	Silver Condor Awards	Best Actor	Moon of Avellaneda	Nominated
2005	Clarín Awards	Best Actor (Film)	The Aura	Won
2006	Silver Condor Awards	Best Actor	The Aura	Won
2007	Sur Awards	Best Actor	The Signal	Nominated
2007	Sur Awards	Best First Film	The Signal	Nominated
2007	Clarín Awards	Best Actor (Film)	The Education of Fairies	Nominated
2007	Clarín Awards	Best Actor (Film)	The Signal	Nominated
2007	Clarín Awards	Best Actor (Film)	XXY	Nominated
2008	Silver Condor Awards	Best Actor	The Signal	Nominated
2008	Silver Condor Awards	Best Director	The Signal	Nominated
2008	Silver Condor Awards	Best Adapted Screenplay	The Signal	Nominated
2009	Chlotrudis Awards	Best Supporting Actor	XXY	Nominated
2009	Silver Condor Awards	Best Actor	The Secret in Their Eyes	Won
2009	Havana Film Festival	Best Actor	The Secret in Their Eyes	Won
2009	Sur Awards	Best Actor	The Secret in Their Eyes	Won
2010	Forqué Awards	Best Actor	The Secret in Their Eyes	Nominated
2010	CEC Awards	Best Actor	The Secret in Their Eyes	Nominated
2010	Goya Awards	Best Actor	The Secret in Their Eyes	Nominated
2010	Goya Awards	Best Supporting Actor	The Dancer and the Thief	Nominated
2010	Martín Fierro Awards	Best Guest Appearance	Para vestir santos	Won
2010	Silver Condor Awards	Best Actor	The Secret in Their Eyes	Won
2010	Sur Awards	Best Actor	Carancho	Nominated
2011	Silver Condor Awards	Best Actor	Carancho	Nominated
2011	Sur Awards	Best Actor	Chinese Take-Away	Won
2012	Silver Condor Awards	Best Actor	Chinese Take-Away	Nominated
2012	Sur Awards	Best Actor	White Elephant	Nominated
2013	Miami Film Festival	Best Performance	A Gun in Each Hand	Won
2013	Sur Awards	Best Actor	Thesis on a Homicide	Nominated
2014	Platino Awards	Best Actor	Thesis on a Homicide	Nominated
2014	Silver Condor Awards	Best Actor	Thesis on a Homicide	Nominated
2014	Sur Awards	Best Actor	Wild Tales	Nominated
2015	Goya Awards	Best Actor	Wild Tales	Nominated
2015	San Sebastián International Film Festival	Best Actor	Truman	Won
2016	Forqué Awards	Best Actor	Truman	Won
2016	Feroz Awards	Best Main Actor	Truman	Won
2016	Gaudí Awards	Best Actor in a Leading Role	Truman	Won
2016	CEC Awards	Best Actor	Truman	Won
2016	Goya Awards	Best Actor	Truman	Won
2016	Actors and Actresses Union Awards	Best Male Leading Performance	Truman	Nominated
2016	Seattle International Film Festival	Best Actor	Truman	Nominated
2016	Platino Awards	Best Actor	Truman	Nominated
2016	Platino Awards	Honorary Award	—	Won
2016	Fénix Awards	Best Actor	Truman	Nominated
2017	San Sebastián International Film Festival	Donostia Award	—	Won
2017	Fénix Awards	Best Actor	The Summit	Nominated
2018	Gaudí Awards	Best Actor in a Leading Role	Black Snow	Nominated
2018	Sur Awards	Best Actor	The Summit	Nominated
2019	Sur Awards	Best Actor	Heroic Losers	Nominated
2020	Platino Awards	Best Actor	Heroic Losers	Nominated
2023	Platino Awards	Best Actor	Argentina, 1985	Won
2023	Silver Condor Awards	Best Actor	Argentina, 1985	Won
2023	Silver Condor Awards	Best Film	Argentina, 1985	Won
2023	Sur Awards	Best Actor	Argentina, 1985	Won
2025	Silver Condor Awards	Best Leading Actor in a Series	The Eternaut	Nominated
2026	Platino Awards	Best Actor in a Miniseries or TV Series	The Eternaut	Won
