= Widows (2011 film) =

2011 film

- Theatrical poster
- Spanish: Viudas
- Directed by: Marcos Carnevale
- Written by: Marcos Carnevale; Bernarda Pagés
- Produced by: Hector Cavallero
- Starring: Graciela Borges; Valeria Bertuccelli; Rita Cortese; Martín Bossi
- Cinematography: Horacio Maira
- Release date: 18 August 2011
- Running time: 100 minutes
- Country: Argentina
- Language: Spanish

Widows (Spanish: Viudas) is a 2011 Argentine comedy-drama film directed by Marcos Carnevale. The film was the second highest grossing non-US film in Argentina in 2011.

== Cast ==
- Graciela Borges as Elena
- Valeria Bertuccelli as Adela
- Rita Cortese as Esther
- Martín Bossi as Justina
