= So Much Love to Give (film) =

2020 Argentinian film

- Film poster
- Spanish: Corazón loco
- Directed by: Marcos Carnevale
- Written by: Adrián Suar; Marcos Carnevale
- Starring: Soledad Villamil; Adrián Suar; Gabriela Toscano
- Distributed by: Netflix
- Release date: September 9, 2020
- Running time: 108 minutes
- Country: Argentina
- Language: Spanish

So Much Love to Give (Spanish: Corazón loco, lit. 'Crazy heart') is a 2020 Argentine comedy film directed by Marcos Carnevale, written by Adrián Suar and Marcos Carnevale and starring Soledad Villamil, Adrián Suar and Gabriela Toscano.

== Cast ==
- Soledad Villamil as Vera
- Adrián Suar as Fernando Ferro
- Gabriela Toscano as Paula
- Darío Barassi
- Betiana Blum
- Alan Sabbagh
- Magela Zanotta

== Release ==
So Much Love to Give was released on September 9, 2020.
