= Secret in Their Eyes =

- Theatrical release poster
- Directed by: Billy Ray
- Screenplay by: Billy Ray
- Based on: El secreto de sus ojos by Juan José Campanella; La pregunta de sus ojos by Eduardo Sacheri
- Produced by: Matt Jackson; Mark Johnson
- Starring: Chiwetel Ejiofor; Nicole Kidman; Julia Roberts; Dean Norris; Michael Kelly; Joe Cole; Alfred Molina
- Cinematography: Danny Moder
- Edited by: Jim Page
- Music by: Emilio Kauderer
- Production companies: Gran Via Productions; IM Global; Route One; Site Productions; Union Investment Partners; Willies Movies AIE; Ingenious Media
- Distributed by: STX Entertainment (United States); Universal Pictures (United Kingdom); Vercine Distribucion (Spain); Pancinema (South Korea)
- Release dates: November 11, 2015 (Los Angeles premiere); November 20, 2015 (United States); February 26, 2016 (United Kingdom); April 15, 2016 (Spain); April 28, 2016 (South Korea)
- Running time: 111 minutes
- Countries: United States; United Kingdom; Spain; South Korea
- Language: English
- Budget: $19.5 million
- Box office: $34.9 million

Secret in Their Eyes is a 2015 thriller film written and directed by Billy Ray and a remake of the 2009 Argentine film of the same name, both based on the novel La pregunta de sus ojos by Eduardo Sacheri. A co-production between the United States, the United Kingdom, South Korea, and Spain, the film stars Chiwetel Ejiofor, Nicole Kidman, and Julia Roberts, with Dean Norris, Michael Kelly, Joe Cole, and Alfred Molina in supporting roles.

The film was released by STXfilms on November 20, 2015. It received a mixed reception from critics, who praised its performances but compared it unfavorably to the original.

== Plot ==
In 2002, shortly after 9/11, Ray Kasten, a counterterrorism agent for the FBI, and his friend Jessica "Jess" Cobb, an investigator for the Los Angeles district attorney's office, meet new ADA Claire Sloan. Jess and Ray receive a call about an unknown female body found in a dumpster near a local mosque, which Ray has been investigating for possible terrorist links. At the crime scene, both are devastated to discover that the victim is Jess's 18-year-old daughter, Carolyn, whose body has been bleached inside and out to destroy DNA evidence of both rape and murder.

Ray, who was supposed to meet Carolyn that day to plan a surprise party for Jess but was late due to work conflicts, feels partially responsible for her death, while Jess feels the increasing need to move out of the city. While helping Jess pack, Ray notices pictures from a picnic thrown for law enforcement in which a young man is seen staring at Carolyn. Ray scans the photo and matches it to Anzor Marzin, who is an informant in the terrorism probe. DA Martin Morales is reluctant to go after Marzin, fearing it would compromise the terrorism investigation. Officer Reggie Siefert brings in a suspect named Aban Ghazala, who Ray realizes is not the killer.

Ray forces Siefert to admit that he set up Ghazala as a patsy to protect Marzin. Ray and Detective Bumpy Willis track down and arrest Marzin at Dodger Stadium. Claire argues with Ray over his methods while taunting Marzin by claiming he wasn't capable of the crime, provoking him to expose himself, confess to the crime, and attack Claire. Ray beats Marzin, which leads to Morales ordering Marzin released. As Marzin gloats, an enraged Ray suggests they kill him before he gets away, but Jess refuses to go that route, saying death would be too easy on him. After his release, the police find Marzin's van, but Siefert burns it to destroy the evidence against Marzin.

Fourteen years later, Ray, now head of security for the New York Mets, returns to Los Angeles and reunites with Claire, now the DA, while Jess, who has been asocial since the loss of her daughter, is Claire's top investigator. Ray has found a man named Clay Beckwith, who he believes is Marzin living under an alias. The investigation eventually leads to a shootout with Beckwith in which Siefert is killed. Beckwith and his men are arrested, but Jess insists that Beckwith is not Marzin.

When Ray and Claire pay a visit to Jess's isolated farmhouse, she confesses that she found and killed Marzin fourteen years previously, shortly after Ray left Los Angeles. Later, Ray follows Jess into her barn and discovers that Marzin is actually alive, having been imprisoned in a cage for over a decade. Marzin begs Ray to ask Jess to talk to him. Ray pulls out his gun and leaves it with Jess as he goes outside and starts digging a grave. Ray hears Jess shooting Marzin. The two meet each other with a sense of relief while Claire officially closes Carolyn's case.

== Cast ==
- Chiwetel Ejiofor as Raymond "Ray" Kasten
- Nicole Kidman as Claire Sloan
- Julia Roberts as Jessica "Jess" Cobb
- Dean Norris as Bumpy Willis
- Michael Kelly as Reginald "Reg" Siefert
- Joe Cole as Anzor Marzin / Clay Beckwith
- Zoe Graham as Carolyn Cobb
- Alfred Molina as Martín Morales
- Lyndon Smith as Kit
- Don Harvey as Fierro
- Mark Famiglietti as Duty Sergeant Jacobs
- Ross Partridge as Ellis

== Production ==
On January 20, 2015, STX Entertainment acquired the US rights to the film. STX also produced the film.

=== Filming ===
Principal photography began on January 26, 2015, in Los Angeles. On January 27, filming took place at Santa Anita Park.

== Release ==
STX had initially scheduled the film for release on October 23, 2015, but in July 2015, the film was moved back to its eventual November 20, 2015 release date.

The film's first trailer was released on June 30, 2015.

=== Home media ===
Secret in Their Eyes was released on DVD and Blu-ray in the United States on February 23, 2016, by Universal Pictures Home Entertainment.

== Reception ==
=== Box office ===
Secret in Their Eyes grossed $20.2 million in North America and $12 million in other territories for a worldwide total of $32.2 million, against a budget of $19.5 million.

In North America, the film opened alongside The Hunger Games: Mockingjay – Part 2 and The Night Before on November 20, 2015. In its opening weekend, it was projected to gross $7–9 million from 2,392 theaters. The film made $170,000 from its early Thursday night screenings and $2.3 million on its first day. In its opening weekend, the film grossed $6.7 million, finishing fifth at the box office.

=== Critical response ===
On Rotten Tomatoes, the film holds an approval rating of 39% based on 149 reviews, with an average rating of 5.3/10. The site's critical consensus reads, "Secret in Their Eyes wastes its incredible cast on a remake that fails to improve upon—or even make a compelling case for its own existence in addition to—the remarkable original." On Metacritic, the film has a weighted average score of 45 out of 100, based on 28 critics, indicating "mixed or average reviews". On CinemaScore, audiences gave the film an average grade of "B−" on an A+ to F scale.

Writer Manuel Betancour of Remezcla said the film "offers a textbook example of what often gets lost in translation when foreign films are remade for American audiences."
