= Victoria 392 =

- Directed by: Juan José Campanella; Fernando Casttetes
- Written by: Juan José Campanella; Fernando Casttetes
- Produced by: Juan José Campanella; Fernando Casttetes
- Starring: Eduardo Blanco; Oavaldo Pelufo; Omar Pini; Dania Asayag; Juan José Campanella
- Cinematography: Fernando Casttetes; Hugo Colace
- Edited by: Juan José Campanella; Fernando Casttetes
- Release date: 1979
- Running time: 90 minutes
- Country: Argentina
- Language: Spanish

Victoria 392 is a 1984 Argentine action-comedy film written, produced, directed and edited by Juan J. Campanella and Fernando Castets in Super 8.

== Cast ==
- Eduardo Blanco
- Osvaldo Peluffo
- Omar Pini
- Dania Asayag
- Osvaldo Belli
- Horacio Heredia
- Bettina Hudson
- Carlos López
- Esteban Bruzzone
- Juan José Campanella
- Juan Carlos Campanella
- Marta Cazenave
- Marcelo Céspedes
- Toto Gutiérrez
- Gonzalo Gabriel López
- Pablo Nisenson
- Susana Nova
- Gabriel Palermo
- Emilio Puertas
- Jimmy Rivero
- Jorge Salazar
- Miguel Ángel Telleria
- Fernando Castets
- Tristán Pellegrini
- Víctor Pellegrini
- Buby Corgo
- Claudia Parada
- Sonia Palermo
- Graciela Viarnés
- Diego Gotheil
