= Love Walked In (film) =

- Theatrical release poster
- Directed by: Juan José Campanella
- Screenplay by: Juan José Campanella; Lynn Geller; Larry Golin
- Based on: Ni el tiro del final by José Pablo Feinmann
- Produced by: Ricardo Freixa; Denis Leary
- Starring: Denis Leary; Terence Stamp; Aitana Sánchez-Gijón; Michael Badalucco; Gene Canfield; Marj Dusay; Danny Nucci
- Cinematography: Daniel Shulman
- Edited by: Darren Kloomok
- Music by: Wendy Blackstone
- Production companies: JEMPSA Entertainment; Apostle Pictures
- Distributed by: TriStar Pictures; Líder Films (1999, Argentina)
- Release date: January 18, 1997 (Sundance Film Festival)
- Running time: 95 minutes
- Countries: Argentina; United States
- Language: English

Love Walked In is a 1997 Argentine-American neo-noir drama/thriller film co-written and directed by Juan José Campanella and starring Denis Leary, Terence Stamp and Aitana Sánchez-Gijón. It was based on the novel Ni el tiro del final ("Not Even The Final Shot") by Argentine writer José Pablo Feinmann. The film takes its title from George Gershwin's song "Love Walked In".

== Plot synopsis ==
Jack is a world-weary pianist and writer in a lounge named the Blue Cat. His wife Vicki is a singer who has a way with the "pseudo-Gershwin" tunes her husband writes. The couple is desperately poor after 10 years of touring crummy clubs.

Meanwhile, Fred Moore, the club owner, is captivated by the beauty of Vicki. Moore is married to a wealthy woman, known only as Mrs. Moore, whom he admits to having married for her money. Although Fred is a faithful husband, the jealous Mrs. Moore has hired Eddie, a private detective who happens to be an old friend of Jack's, to gather evidence of Fred's infidelity. Having come up with nothing, the sleazy detective begs Jack to help by arranging for Vicki to seduce Fred in front of a hidden camera. Together Jack, Vicky and Eddie plan to blackmail Moore.

At the same time Jack is also writing a crime short story set in the 1930s, a noiresque crime thriller, which the viewer sees inter cut in imaginary scenes as Jack narrates. This secondary narration is also a telling of what happens with Jack and Vicki in a different and subtle way.

== Cast ==
- Denis Leary as Jack Hanaway
- Terence Stamp as Fred Moore
- Aitana Sánchez-Gijón as Vicky Rivas
- Michael Badalucco as Eddie Bianco
- Danny Nucci as Cousin Matt
- Marj Dusay as Mrs. Moore
- Neal Huff as Howard
- J.K. Simmons as Mr. Shulman
- Moira Kelly as Vera
- Justin Lazard as Lenny
- Rocco Sisto as Ilm Zamsky
- Gene Canfield as Joey
- Jimmy McQuaid as Young Howard
- Murphy Guyer as Howard's Boss
- Paul Eagle as Landlord
- Fiddle Viracola as Aunt Ethel
- Jeremy Webb as Hampton's Waiter
- Gregory Scanlon as Valet
- Gary DeWitt Marshall as Broken Ivory Bartender
- D.C. Benny as Comedian
- Patrick Boll as Porter

== Reception ==
Dennis Schwartz gave the film a grade D.

Roger Ebert gave the film 2 out of 4. Stephen Holden of the New York Times wrote: "Nothing in "Love Walked In" makes psychological or even economic sense. In one preposterous plot turn after another, the movie does awkward somersaults to try to drum up tension and generate heat."

== TWA Flight 800 Disaster ==
On the evening of July 17, 1996, at 8:31 pm, the production was filming in the banquet hall of a Westhampton, New York, beach club. Camera and sound equipment were recording when TWA Flight 800 exploded directly south of the beach. Sounds of the blast were caught on sound recording equipment. Two blasts were heard by crew members.
