= The Education of Fairies =

- Film poster
- Spanish: La educación de las hadas
- Directed by: José Luis Cuerda
- Based on: L'Éducation d'une fée by Didier Van Cauwelaert
- Produced by: Gerardo Herrero; Mariela Besuievksy; Sarah Halioua; Marta Esteban
- Starring: Ricardo Darín; Irène Jacob; Bebe; Víctor Valdivia
- Cinematography: Hans Burmann
- Edited by: Nacho Ruiz Capillas
- Music by: Lucio Godoy
- Production companies: Tornasol Films; Finales Felices; Messidor Films; Lazennec; Pol-Ka Producciones; Madragoa Filmes
- Release date: 23 June 2006 (Spain)
- Running time: 103 minutes
- Countries: Spain; France; Argentina; Portugal
- Languages: Spanish; French

The Education of Fairies (Spanish: La educación de las hadas) is a 2006 drama film directed by José Luis Cuerda. It is a co-production by companies from Spain, France, Argentina, and Portugal (Tornasol Films, Finales Felices, Messidor Films, Lazennec, Pol-Ka Producciones, Madragoa Filmes). It is based on the 2000 novel L'Éducation d'une fée by Didier Van Cauwelaert and primarily shot in Spanish, with some dialogue in French.

== Summary ==
One morning, on a flight from Alicante to Barcelona, Nicolás meets Ingrid, a widowed ornithologist, and her son Raúl, a boy with an extraordinary imagination. At that moment, love blossoms, a fairy tale between the woman and the toy inventor, in which the little boy plays a significant role. However, everything shatters suddenly when Ingrid decides to end the relationship without any apparent reason. Raul thinks their relationship can now only be saved by a fairy. But do fairies exist?

== Cast ==
- Ricardo Darín as Nicolás
- Irène Jacob as Ingrid
- Bebe as Sezar
- Víctor Valdivia as Raúl
- Jordi Bosch as Matarredona

== See also ==
- List of Spanish films of 2006
- List of Argentine films of 2007
