= Eduardo Blanco (actor) =

Argentine actor

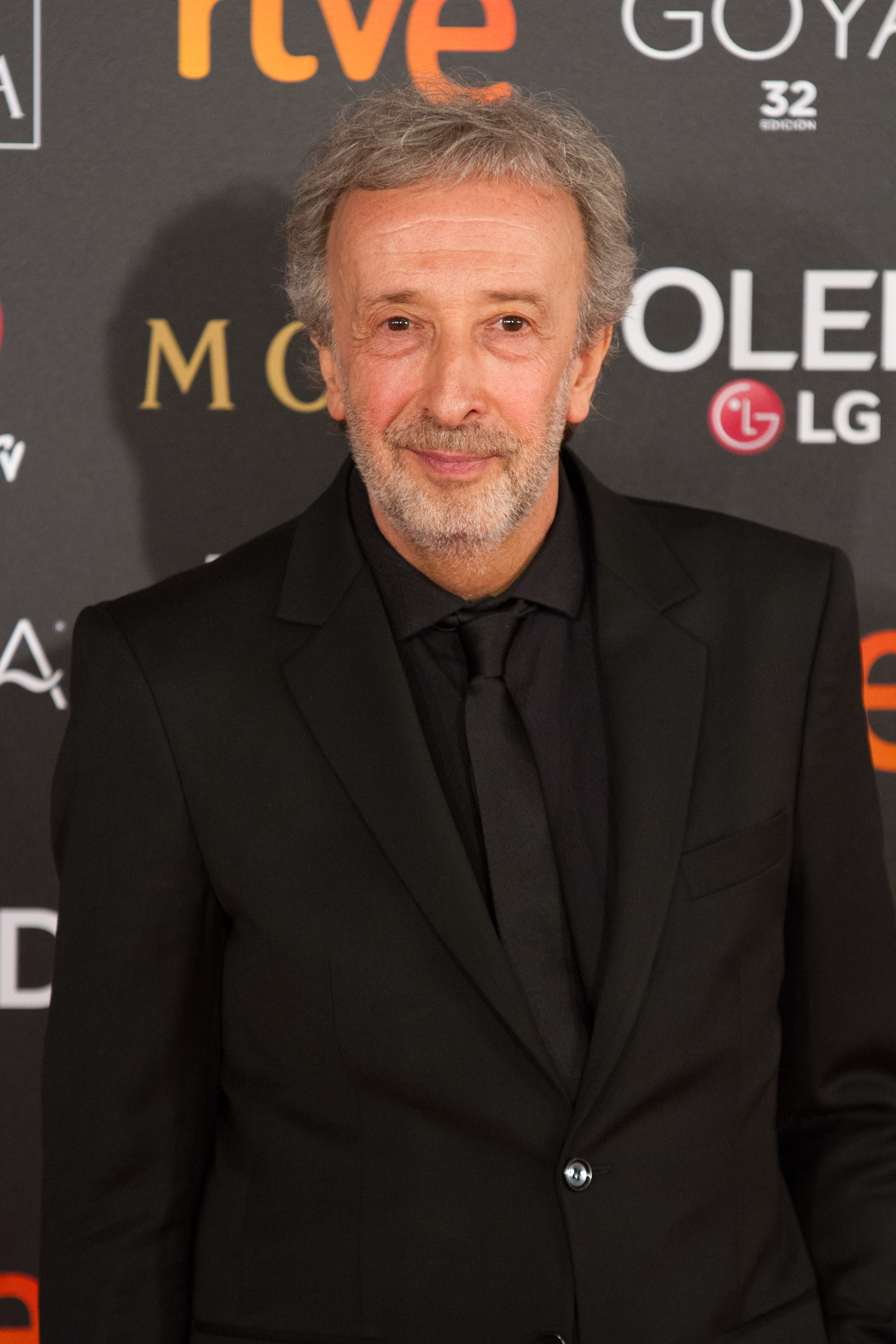
- Blanco at the 32nd Goya Awards in 2018
- Born: 28 February 1958 (age 67); Buenos Aires, Argentina
- Occupation: Actor
- Years active: 1984–present

Eduardo Blanco (born 28 February 1958) is an Argentine actor best known for his roles in the trilogy of films directed by Juan José Campanella, his friend and frequent collaborator: El mismo amor, la misma lluvia (1999), El hijo de la novia (2001) and Luna de Avellaneda (2004).

== Biography ==
Blanco was born in Buenos Aires, Argentina, to Galician parents from Silleda and Lalín. He started as a theater actor, most notably under the direction of Norma Aleandro in Cyrano de Bergerac as well as having roles in Shakespeare plays like A Midsummer Night's Dream and Macbeth. His screen debut was in Victoria 392, where he met and befriended director Juan José Campanella and fellow screenwriter Fernando Castets. Campanella and Castets would later on write roles specifically for him in a trilogy of movies that starred Ricardo Darín as the protagonist and Blanco as his friend: El mismo amor, la misma lluvia (1999), El hijo de la novia (2001) and Luna de Avellaneda (2004). Blanco went on to collaborate a fifth time with Campanella in the TV series, Vientos de agua (2006).

== Filmography ==
=== Film ===
- Victoria 392 (1984)
- El mismo amor, la misma lluvia (1999) .... Roberto
- Aunque tú no lo sepas (2000) .... Matón 2
- El hijo de la novia (2001) .... Juan Carlos
- Detrás de la imágen (2003, short)
- Conversaciones con mamá (2004) .... Jaime
- Luna de Avellaneda (2004) .... Amadeo Grimberg
- Dolores de casada (2004)
- Tapas (2005) .... Edgardo
- Un minuto de silencio (2005) .... Ernesto
- El tango de la psicoanalista (2005)
- Naranjo en flor (2008)
- Pájaros muertos (2008) .... Hugo
- La vida empieza hoy (2010) .... Alfredo
- Una hora más en Canarias (2010) .... Eduardo
- 180° (2010) .... Lazarte
- El pozo (2012) .... Franco
- Una mujer sucede (2012) .... Santos
- 20.000 besos (2013) .... El Jefe
- Paternoster (2013) .... Tito
- Kamikaze (2014) .... Eugene
- Cuando dejes de quererme (2018) .... Fredo

=== Television ===
- Duro como la roca... frágil como el cristal (1985)
- La viuda blanca (1986) .... Aurelio
- Por siempre mujercitas (1995) .... Mauro
- El hombre (1999) .... Gibelli (uncredited)
- Primicias (2000) .... Zorlegui
- El sodero de mi vida (2001) .... Filkenstein
- Franco Buenaventura, el profe (2002) .... Omar Peña
- Historias de sexo de gente común (2005) .... Daniel
- Mujeres asesinas (2005)
- Vientos de agua (2006) .... Ernesto Olaya
