= The Signal (2007 Argentine film) =

La señal
- Theatrical release poster
- Directed by: Ricardo Darín; Martín Hodara
- Written by: Eduardo Mignogna
- Starring: Ricardo Darín; Diego Peretti; Julieta Díaz; Andrea Pietra
- Cinematography: Marcelo Camorino
- Edited by: Alejandro Carrillo Penovi
- Music by: César Lerner
- Production companies: Patagonik Film Group; Buena Vista International
- Distributed by: Walt Disney Studios Motion Pictures
- Release date: 13 August 2007
- Running time: 95 minutes
- Country: Argentina
- Language: Spanish

The Signal (Spanish: La señal) is a 2007 Argentine-Spanish neo-noir mystery drama film written by Eduardo Mignogna. Mignogna was going to direct the film as well. However, due to his death one year before the start of production, his friend and frequent collaborator, Ricardo Darín, took up the task. He was aided by Martín Hodara, who had his directorial debut. Darín also starred in the lead role, along with Diego Peretti, Julieta Díaz and Andrea Pietra.

The film is dedicated to Eduardo Mignogna.

== Synopsis ==
The film starts in medias res, with Corvalán hiding in a safehouse and preparing himself for a gunfight. The film then takes a step back to the start, in the form of a flashback. The year is 1952: Eva Perón has retired from public life due to poor health, and her final days are being broadcast on the radio. Corvalán, alias "El Pibe" (The Kid, Ricardo Darín) and Santana (Diego Peretti) are two amateur private detectives living off oddjobs and gambling. Corvalán is also in a decaying relationship with Perla (Andrea Pietra). After one unlucky day at the tracks, Corvalán meets a mysterious woman, Gloria (Julieta Díaz), in a café. She passes him her telephone number and leaves. Corvalán tries to contact her, but unsuccessfully so until he is reached by Gloria herself, and presented with an assignment: trail a man, Nicolás Pertureta, all day and report his movements. Although Pertureta proves difficult to follow, Corvalán manages to garner information about Pertureta contacting a number of shady people.

Corvalán recruits his cautious partner, Santana, into the assignment - while keeping his regular tasks in hand. Perla is caught cheating on Corvalán, Pertureta is found strangled with barbed wire, and it is revealed that Gloria is married to a major mafia boss, "El Noruego" (The Norwegian), who is being stalked by Dino Capuano, the last surviving member of a family he massacred years ago in Sicily. Because El Noruego suspects a snitch, and Gloria fears for her safety, she confesses to Corvalán that she hired him to give her, and indirectly her husband, proof that the snitch is Pertureta.

Santana wants no business with the feud between El Noruego and Dino Capuano, but Corvalán, moved by Gloria's story, decides to help her, and together they go into hiding at a safehouse. It is here that the movie catches up with the start, and Corvalán engages in a gunfight with El Noruego's henchmen. He and Gloria escape after killing one of them, and as Corvalán runs out of bullets, Santana arrives and rescues them.

Upon getting word that El Noruego and his gang have been gunned down by Capuano's men, Gloria manages to convince Corvalán to disappear with her. To do so, Corvalán must first return to El Noruego's place and open the safe that holds savings worth a lifetime. In the movie's climax, Corvalán manages to open the safe and reads the "Remington" seal in the safe-box and remembers that days ago his father told him he had a safe-box with a five-digit combination.Corvalán is suddenly interrupted by Gloria's chauffeur, who points a gun at him and demands the money. Just as he is about to kill him, he is shot in the back by Gloria as he, in turn, shoots Corvalán. Gloria leaves Corvalán to die, and walks away with the money.

In the last scene, Santana painfully identifies Corvalán's body at the morgue. He mutters "So long, my friend" (in English) and leaves. In the radio, a speaker announces the death of Eva Perón and the national mourning.
