= Capitales del Fútbol =

- Genre: Sports documentary
- Created by: Esteban Apraez
- Directed by: Camilo Antolini
- Original languages: Spanish, Portuguese
- No. of episodes: 9

Production
- Producers: Juan José Campanella, Esteban Apraez, Camilo Antolini, Muriel Cabeza

Original release
- Network: ESPN, ESPN2, ESPN+, ESPN Deportes, ESPN Play
- Release: 17 April 2011 – 25 September 2012

Capitales del Fútbol (English: Football Capitals) is a documentary-series produced by ESPN's International Marketing Solutions group in collaboration with Juan José Campanella's studio 100Bares. The show, which profiles cities where football is a way of life, originally premiered across Latin America in April 2011. Entering a third season, the show has expanded to include the US. It is ESPN International's most successful original series ever with nearly 20 million viewers.

Capitales is both a travel documentary and a sports feature.

The original season featured Buenos Aires, Madrid, Milan, and Rio de Janeiro. Capitales del Fútbol went on to become the all-time highest-rated original series in Latin America, leading to the return of both a second and third season.

Both seasons were released simultaneously on ESPN's Spanish-speaking network ESPN Deportes in 2012 and 2013. The Home Depot was the program's presenting sponsor. Branded segments introducing the show were integrated using the "Futbol Center Construido por The Home Depot" platform.

== Episodes ==
The episodes premiered in different orders across various regions.

=== Season 1 (2011) ===
The first season had a total of 7 million viewers.

City	Featured Derby	Other matches	Notable appearances
"Capitales del Fútbol: Buenos Aires"	Boca Juniors vs. River Plate	TBA	Matías Almeyda, Roberto Perfumo, Matías Martin
"Capitales del Fútbol: Madrid"	Real Madrid vs. Atletico de Madrid	TBA	Diego Forlan
"Capitales del Fútbol: Milan"	AC Milan vs. Inter Milan	TBA	Javier Zanetti, Gianluca Zambrotta, Iván Cordoba, José Mourinho, Esteban Cambiasso
"Capitales del Fútbol: Rio de Janeiro"	Flamengo vs. Fluminense	TBA	Ronaldinho

=== Season 2 (2012) ===
The second season had a total of 11.5 million viewers.

City	Featured Derby	Other matches	Notable appearances
"Capitales del Fútbol: Barcelona"	FC Barcelona vs. Real Madrid	TBA	Xavi, Johan Cruyff, Joan Laporta, Mauricio Pochettino, Rafael Marañón
"Capitales del Fútbol: Bogota"	TBA	Millonarios vs. Deportivo Pasto, Independiente Santa Fe vs. Itagüí Ditaires	Freddy Rincón, Omar Pérez, Nelson Ramos
"Capitales del Fútbol: Manchester"	Manchester United vs. Manchester City	TBA	Sergio Agüero, Pablo Zabaleta, Nani, Patrick Vieira
"Capitales del Fútbol: Mexico City"	Club América vs. Pumas	Cruz Azul vs. Santos	Christian Giménez, Efraín Velarde, Ricardo Peláez, Molotov, Guillermo Vásquez
"Capitales del Fútbol: São Paulo"	Corinthians vs. Palmeiras	Sao Paulo FC vs. Catanduvense	Rogério Ceni, Freddy Rincón

=== Season 3 (2013) ===
Capitales del Fútbol was renewed for a third season, set to release in Latin America in 2013, with London being announced as the first capital.

== Reception ==
Capitales del Fútbol was an immediate success with more than seven million viewers tuning in during the first season, making it the highest rated original series ever in ESPN's history in Latin America. After two seasons, over 17 million viewers in Latin America had tuned in.
