= Prim, el asesinato de la calle del Turco =

2014 Spanish telefilm

- Genre: Political thriller Period drama
- Written by: Nacho Faerna; Virginia Yagüe
- Directed by: Miguel Bardem
- Starring: Francesc Orella; Javier Godino; Pedro Casablanc; Daniel Grao; Víctor Clavijo; Manolo Solo; Simón Andreu
- Country of origin: Spain
- Original language: Spanish

Production
- Running time: 98 minutes
- Production companies: TVE; TVC; Shine Iberia; Dream Team Concept

Original release
- Network: La 1
- Release: 15 December 2014

Prim, el asesinato de la calle del Turco is a Spanish television film directed by Miguel Bardem recreating the magnicide of Juan Prim in 1870. It originally aired on 15 December 2014 on La 1.

== Premise ==
Narrated by Benito Pérez Galdós, a young journalist at the time the events take place, the fiction accounts for the political intrigues and conspiracies in the last year of the life of General Prim, prime minister of Spain, who had to find a suitable candidate to the country's throne. It involves all the prime suspects behind Prim's murder, an unsolved case up to this date. Prim's carriage was shot in the Calle del Turco on 28 December 1870. Wounded in the assassination attempt, Prim would die two days later.

== Cast ==
- Francesc Orella as Juan Prim, Prime Minister of Spain also serving as Minister of War.
- Javier Godino as Benito Pérez Galdós, a young Canarian journalist.
- Pedro Casablanc as Felipe de Solís y Campuzano, Montpensier's confidant and personal secretary.
- Daniel Grao as José María Pastor, General Serrano's security chief.
- Víctor Clavijo as José Paúl y Angulo, a Republican politician, Prim's enemy.
- Javivi as Antonio de Orleans, Duke of Montpensier.
- Simón Andreu as Francisco Serrano y Domínguez, Regent of Spain.
- Manolo Solo as Juan José González Nandín, Prim's personal secretary.
- Yuriria del Valle as Francisca "Paca" Agüero, Prim's Mexican wife.
- Enrique Villén as Moya.
- Pepe Lorente as Bravo.
- Itsaso Arana as Josefa.
- Secun de la Rosa as Gaspar Ruiz.
- Luis Bermejo as Rojo Arias.
- José Luis Alcobendas as Felipe Ducazcal y Lasheras, the leader of the "Partida de la Porra".
- Alfonso Lara as Montesinos.
- Carmen Segarra as Doña Encarna.
- Jesús Noguero as López.
- Paco Marín as Sostrada.
- David Pinilla as Topete.
- Francisco Olmo as Don Bernardo.

== Production and release ==
A Televisión Española co-production together with Shine Iberia, Televisió de Catalunya and Dream Team Concept, the TV movie was written by Nacho Faerna and Virginia Yagüe and directed by Miguel Bardem. It was created on occasion of the 200th anniversary of Joan Prim's birth.

The movie was pre-screened at the Festival Internacional de Cine de San Sebastián. Gregorio de la Fuente Monge and José Álvarez Junco collaborated as historical advisors. Aired in prime time on La 1 on 15 December 2014, the telefilm earned a 13.2% audience share and 2,491,000 viewers.

== Awards and nominations ==
Year	Award	Category	Nominee(s)	Result	Ref.
2015	Zapping Awards	Best Actor	Francesc Orella	Won	
2015	3rd MiM Series Awards	Best Miniseries or TV Movie		Won	
