= National Priority =

- Directed by: Juan J. Campanella
- Written by: Juan J. Campanella
- Produced by: Juan J. Campanella
- Starring: Juan J. Campanella; Ricardo Cerone
- Edited by: Juan J. Campanella
- Release date: 1979
- Running time: 22 minutes
- Country: Argentina
- Language: Spanish

National Priority (Spanish: Prioridad nacional) is a 1979 Argentine short film. It was the first film made by Juan J. Campanella, Argentina's most successful contemporary filmmaker. The 22-minute film features Campanella himself and actor Ricardo Cerone.

== Cast ==
- Juan J. Campanella
- Ricardo Cerone
- Ismael Alba
- Jorge Rosas
- Carlos Muy
- Pablo Rossetti
- Carlos Seraphim
