= 7th Floor =

- Film poster
- Spanish: Séptimo
- Directed by: Patxi Amezcua
- Screenplay by: Patxi Amezcua; Alejo Flah
- Produced by: Álvaro Augustin; Jordi Gasull; Axel Kuschevatzky; Andrés Longares; Matías Mosteirín; Edmon Roch; Hugo Sigman
- Starring: Ricardo Darín; Belén Rueda; Abel Dolz Doval; Charo Dolz Doval; Luis Ziembrowski; Osvaldo Santoro; Guillermo Arengo
- Cinematography: Lucio Bonelli
- Edited by: Lucas Nolla
- Music by: Roque Baños
- Production companies: CEPA Audiovisual; El Toro Productions; Ikiru Films; K&S Films; Kramer & Sigman Films; Telecinco Cinema; Televisión Federal
- Distributed by: Film & TV House; Hispano Fox Film; 20th Century Fox; Batrax Entertainment; Film Factory Entertainment; GEM Entertainment
- Release date: September 5, 2013
- Running time: 88 minutes
- Countries: Spain; Argentina
- Language: Spanish

7th Floor (Spanish: Séptimo) is a 2013 Argentine-Spanish mystery film directed and co-written by Patxi Amezcua. The film stars Ricardo Darín and Belén Rueda.

== Plot ==
Sebastián Roberti is a successful lawyer in Buenos Aires. When his two children mysteriously disappear, he has to do everything in his power to find them.

== Cast ==
- Ricardo Darín as Sebastián
- Belén Rueda as Delia
- Luis Ziembrowski as Miguel
- Osvaldo Santoro as Rosales
- Guillermo Arengo as Rubio
- Jorge D'Elía as Goldstein

== Reception ==
The film was a box-office success in the Hispanic world and received mixed reviews from critics. Jonathan Holland from The Hollywood Reporter wrote: "It’s clear from watching 7th Floor that the primary aim at the planning stage was to generate suspense. There’s enough in the fact of a father losing his kids to sustain the first hour, but once the question of the kids’ location has been solved, then Alejo Flah's script runs into all sorts of thoughtless credibility issues which only the most undemanding viewer will be prepared to excuse. “Don’t use your phone,” Rosales instructs Sebastian, and he doesn't. So why does it then runs out of battery at an inappropriate moment?".

At the Miami International Film Festival, the film competed for the "Grand Jury Prize".
