= The Disco of Love =

- Spanish: La discoteca del amor
- Directed by: Adolfo Aristarain
- Produced by: Fernando Ayala
- Release date: 1980
- Running time: 90 minute
- Country: Argentina
- Language: Spanish

The Disco of Love (Spanish: La discoteca del amor) is a 1980 Argentine film written and directed by Adolfo Aristarain. Part of the detective genre, the film stars Cacho Castaña and Ricardo Darín.

== Summary ==
A police adventure about music piracy involving a detective and his assistant in a battle against a gang of criminals.

== Cast ==
- Cacho Castaña …Lucas Echeverry, alias Cacho Castaña
- Mónica Gonzaga …Gloria
- Ricardo Darín …Eddie Ulmer
- Tincho Zabala ...Guillermo Beaudine
- Stella Maris Lanzani …Francisca Luppo, alias Déborah
- Carlos del Burgo ...Romeo Pérez
- Silvia Pérez …Ángela
- Sergio Velasco Ferrero …Walter Pardo
- Arturo Maly …Dr. J. B.
- Tito Mendoza …Lugosi
- Eduardo Ruderman …Segundo de Lugosi
- Enrique Otranto ...Segundo de Lugosi
- Marcos Woinski …Orejas
- Enrique Latorre...Tomás Gómez
- Osvaldo Capiaggi
- Alberto Ferrós
- Luis Valles
- Adolfo Marcos
- Camilo Sesto
- Ángela Carrasco
- Tormenta
- Isidoro Chiodi
- Jorge Chernov …Cantor de protesta
- Leo Rivas …Presentador
- Adolfo Aristarain …Cameo (vendedor de disquería)
- Franco Simone
- José José
- Sonia Rivas
- Silvana Lis
- Hernán Gené
- Guillermo Chinetti
- José Cantero
- Juan Carlos Gioria
- Elena Schiavone
- Daniel Ripari
- Arturo Noal
- Alejandro Pimentel …Hombre que va al baño
- Horacio Maira …Hombre que va al baño
- Gonzalo Astorga …Patinador
- Juan Ritter …Fotógrafo
- Alejandro Arando …Fotógrafo
- Katunga

== Reception ==
Ángel Faretta in Convicción wrote: "It is, above all, a juicy homage to the American thriller... A fictional universe controlled down to the smallest details, as the plot... in addition to the game of references and homages already mentioned, constitutes a solid story that blends equally the most thrilling action and the most carefree humor."

La Opinión wrote: "A different comedy... in terms of its direction, it aligns with the previous ones, that's true, but here everything is different: from the good editing to the individual work of Tincho Zabala, Cacho Castaña, Silvia Pérez, Carlos del Burgo, and Tito Mendoza."

Manrupe and Portela write: "A true minor classic. And an example of how to turn a commercial product into an interesting and entertaining film. Aristarain achieves it through his screenplay and his actors, in a parody of genre cinema where Tito Mendoza's James Cagney-like performance stands out."
