= Soledad Villamil =

Argentine actress and singer

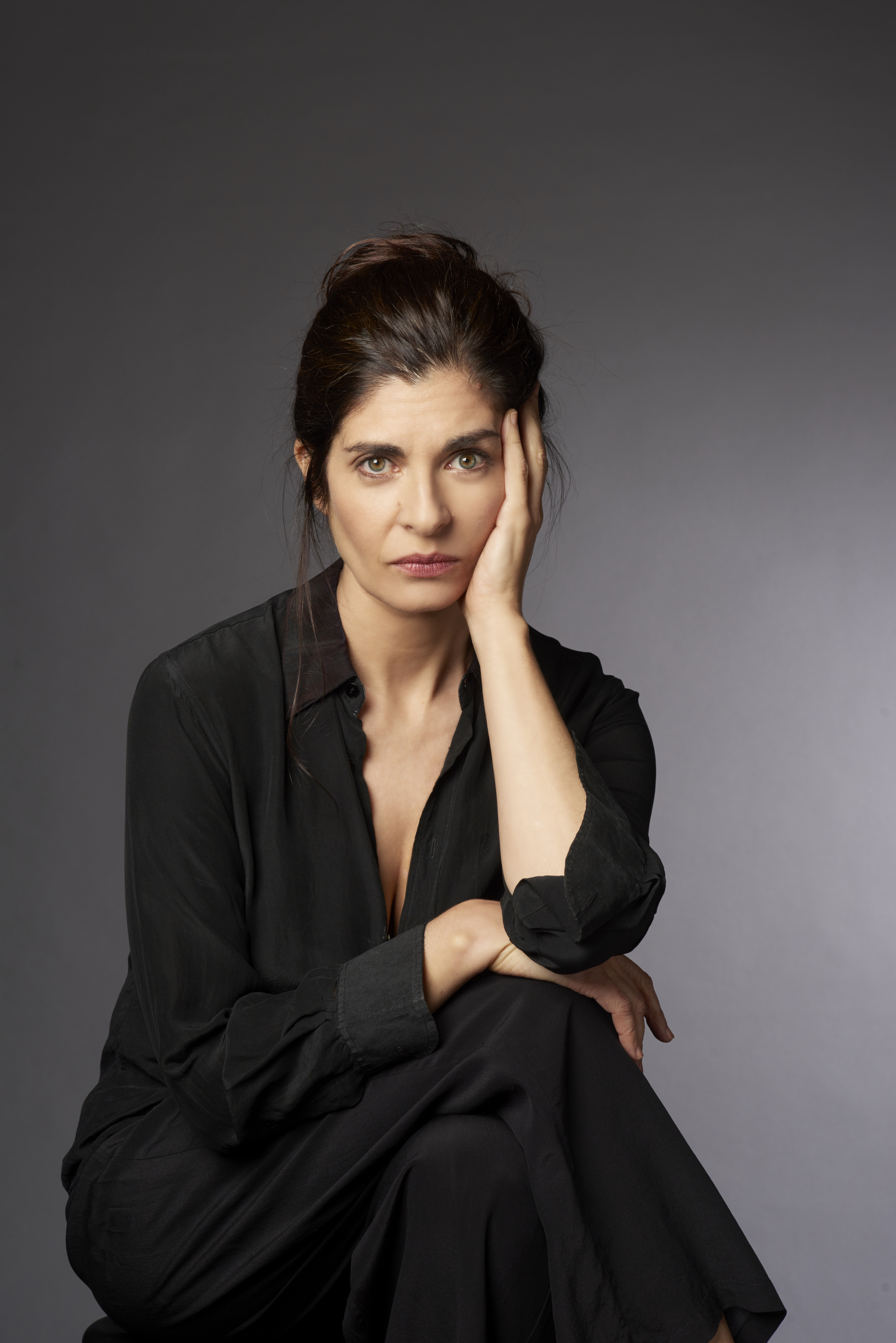
- Born: Soledad Villamil; June 19, 1969 (age 56); La Plata, Argentina
- Occupations: Actress, Singer
- Spouse: Federico Olivera
- Children: Violeta Olivera; Clara Olivera
- Parent: Hugo Sergio Villamil
- Website: www.soledadvillamil.com

Soledad Villamil (born June 19, 1969 in La Plata) is an Argentine film and television actress and singer. She has won two Carlos Gardel Awards, Argentine equivalent of American Grammy Awards and British BRIT Awards besides, Goya Award for Best New Actress for the film, The Secret in Their Eyes.

As an actress, she has worked in films, theatre and television.

As a singer she has released four albums so far, tackling Argentine tango and folklore themes.

== Personal life ==
She is married to Federico Olivera, also an actor, since 1997. They have two children, Violeta and Clara Olivera.

Her parents are Sergio Villamil, doctor and Laura Falcoff, journalist. She has two siblings, Camila and Nicolás.

== Filmography (partial) ==
- Goyo (2024)
- Corazón loco (2020)
- A Twelve-Year Night (2018)
- Todos tenemos un plan (2012) Everybody Has a Plan
- El secreto de sus ojos (2009) The Secret in Their Eyes
- No sos vos, soy yo (2004) It's Not You, It's Me
- Un oso rojo (2002) A Red Bear
- El mismo amor, la misma lluvia (1999) Same Love, Same Rain
- El sueño de los héroes (1997)
- La vida según Muriel (1997)
- Un Muro de Silencio (1993)
- Vivir mata (1991)

== Television (partial) ==
- Cromañon (2024)
- Televisión por la identidad (2007)
- Locas de amor (2004)
- Culpables (2001)
- Vulnerables (1999)
