= Moon of Avellaneda =

- Theatrical release poster
- Directed by: Juan José Campanella
- Written by: Juan José Campanella; Fernando Castets; Juan Pablo Domenech
- Produced by: Adrián Suar; Fernando Blanco; Geraldo Herrero; José Estrada Mora
- Starring: Ricardo Darín; Eduardo Blanco; Mercedes Morán; Valeria Bertuccelli
- Cinematography: Daniel Shulman
- Edited by: Camilo Antolini
- Music by: Ángel Illaramendi
- Release date: May 20, 2004 (Argentina)
- Running time: 123 minutes
- Countries: Argentina; Spain
- Language: Spanish

Moon of Avellaneda (Spanish: Luna de Avellaneda, also known as Avellaneda's Moon in English) is a 2004 Argentine comedy-drama film directed by Juan José Campanella, and written by Campanella, Fernando Castets and Juan Pablo Domenech. It stars Ricardo Darín in his third collaboration with Campanella and Eduardo Blanco in his fourth collaboration, as well as Mercedes Morán and Valeria Bertuccelli.

== Plot ==
Román Maldonado (Ricardo Darín) was born during a carnival fair held at "Luna de Avellaneda", a sports and social club located in Avellaneda, Buenos Aires province. He is made a member for life, and the club becomes a central part of his life.

The club used to have over 8,000 members in its heyday, but in the 2000s membership has dwindled to some 300. The neighbourhood is decaying, the surviving inhabitants are struggling financially and gatherings are hardly what they used to be. To top things off, Román discovers his wife Verónica is having an affair, and their marriage finds itself at its worst.

Together with Amadeo Grimberg (Eduardo Blanco) and Graciela (Mercedes Morán), friends from the club, he must fight for the survival of the place before it is sold off and turned into a casino.

The film chronicles the ups and downs of this fight, as well as Amadeo's struggling relationship with Cristina (Valeria Bertuccelli), Román's family crisis and the difficulties Graciela has after her husband leaves. In the end, a vote to keep the club alive is defeated 33 to 26, and the main characters find themselves parting ways in a bittersweet manner. The ending is however upbeat, as Román finds hope in finding his old club membership card, and together with Amadeo hints that they will start a new one.

== Cast ==
- Ricardo Darín as Román Maldonado
- Eduardo Blanco as Amadeo Grimberg
- Mercedes Morán as Graciela
- Valeria Bertuccelli as Cristina
- Silvia Kutika as Verónica
- José Luis López Vázquez as Don Aquiles
- Daniel Fanego as Alejandro
- Atilio Pozzobon as Atilio
- Horacio Peña as Julio
- María Victoria Biscay as Macarena
- Francisco Fernández De Rosa as Darío
- Micaela Moreno as Dalma
- Alan Sabbagh as Ismael
- Sofia Bertolotto as Yanina, Dario's girlfriend
- Ezequiel Merlino as Bruno

== Awards ==
- Clarin Entertainment Awards: Clarin Award, Best Supporting Actor - Film (Cine: Mejor Actor de reparto), Eduardo Blanco; 2004.
- Havana Film Festival: Coral, Sound, José Luis Díaz; 2004.

Nominations

- Goya Awards: Goya, Best Spanish Language Foreign Film (Mejor Película Extranjera de Habla Hispana), Juan José Campanella, Argentina; 2004.

== Inspiration ==
The film is inspired by a real club, the "Club Juventud Unida de Llavallol" of Buenos Aires, in which much of its scenes were filmed and also in real situations that occurred at the time of the 2001 Argentina crisis, that are represented in the film as everyday dramas suffered by a society which purchasing power and subsistence collapsed when incomes were not enough to pay even for basic services (gas, water, electricity), while the club struggles, trying to resist, against the onslaught of the debt-burdened economy.
