= Juan José Campanella =

Argentine television and film director, writer and producer

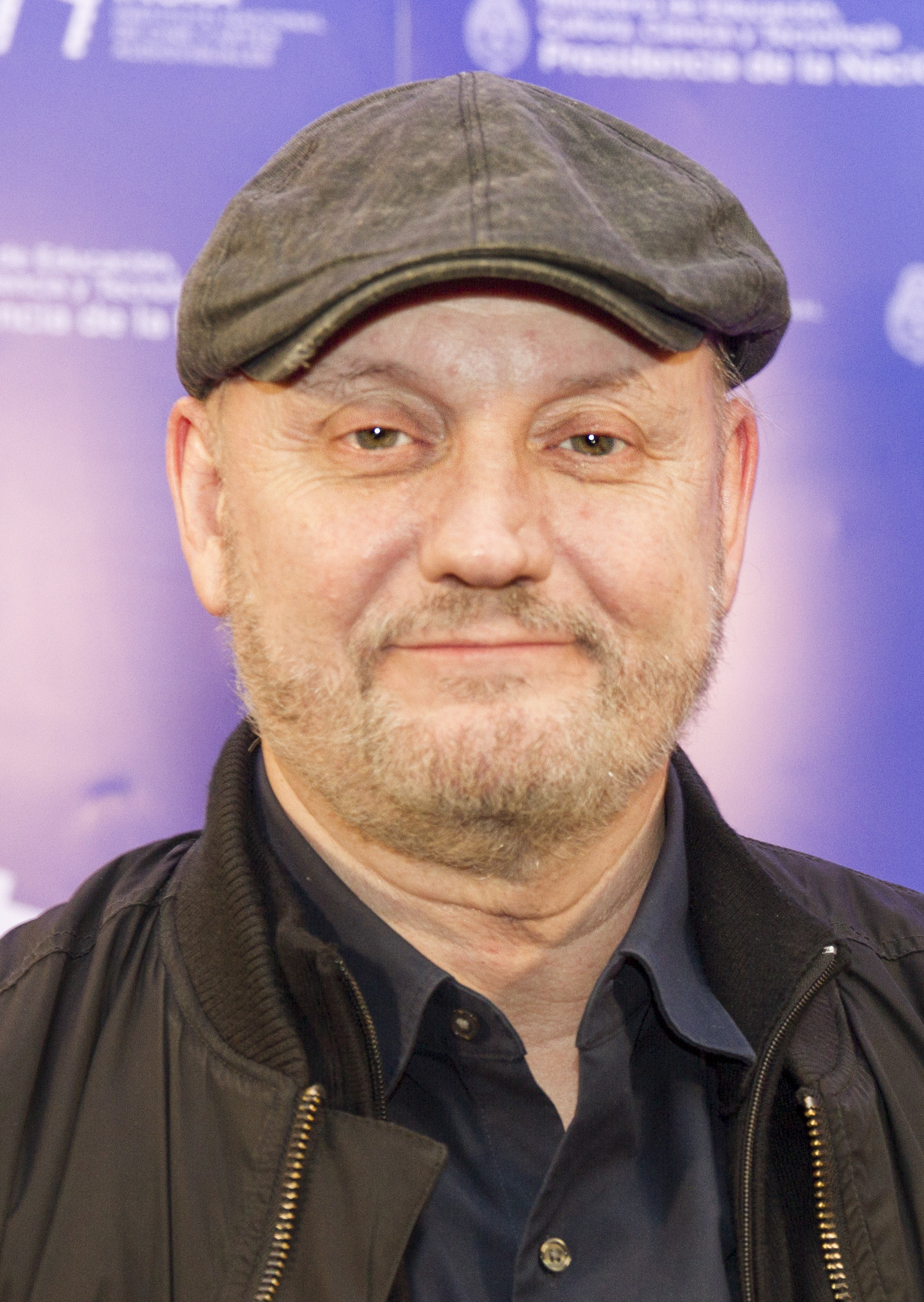
- Campanella in 2019
- Born: 19 July 1959 (age 67); Buenos Aires, Argentina
- Citizenship: Argentina; Spain
- Education: New York University
- Occupation: Filmmaker
- Years active: 1979–present

Juan José Campanella (born 19 July 1959) is an Argentine television and film director, writer and producer. He achieved worldwide attention with the release of The Secret in Their Eyes (2009), for which he was awarded the Academy Award for Best Foreign Language Film.

== Early life ==
Campanella was born in Buenos Aires, Argentina. He started studying engineering, but dropped out in 1980 after four years at university. He would later remark that the decisive factor for this decision was watching All That Jazz on the very day he was going to apply for a fifth year. His debut as director was in 1979, with the short Prioridad nacional. Campanella traveled to the United States and entered the Tisch School of the Arts. Four years later, in 1984, his second film, Victoria 392, which marked the first of five collaborations with actor friend Eduardo Blanco, as well as his first collaboration with screenwriter Fernando Castets, with whom he co-directed and co-wrote the film.

== Career ==
After graduating from NYU film school, Campanella went on to direct two American films: The Boy Who Cried Bitch in 1991 and Love Walked In in 1997.

In 1999, Campanella reunited once more with Castets to write El Mismo Amor, la Misma Lluvia, which starred actor friend Ricardo Darín (who had met Campanella 15 years before, abroad) and Eduardo Blanco. The formula would be repeated with two other films, in El Hijo de la Novia, 2001 (nominated for Oscar for best foreign language film in 2002) and in Luna de Avellaneda, 2004, all of which teamed Campanella and Castests as screenwriters, and Darín and Blanco as leading and supporting actor, respectively. Darín reprised the role of Campanella's leading man in the mystery film The Secret in Their Eyes (2009), Campanella's fourth feature-length film. It won the Academy Award for Best Foreign Language Film in 2010.

Campanella has directed episodes of American TV series such as House, Law & Order: Special Victims Unit, Law & Order: Criminal Intent, 30 Rock, Halt and Catch Fire and Colony.

Campanella has worked 5 times with Blanco, 4 times with Ricardo Darín and 2 times with Héctor Alterio. Campanella has also directed a number of Argentine actors, including Norma Aleandro, Alfredo Alcón, Ulises Dumont, Natalia Verbeke, Adrián Suar, Mercedes Morán, Valeria Bertuccelli and Rodrigo de la Serna, as well as English-speaking actors Christopher Meloni, Denis Leary, Adrien Brody, Moira Kelly, Justin Long, Vincent D'Onofrio, Alec Baldwin, Tina Fey, Tracy Morgan, Rachel Dratch, Hope Davis, Jay Hernandez, Bridget Moynahan, Stephen Colbert, and Hugh Laurie.

== Personal life ==
Campanella holds a Master in Fine Arts from New York University and is studying towards a Masters in Political Science from Universidad Torcuato di Tella. He has held Spanish citizenship since 2006.

== Filmography ==
=== Film ===
Year	Title	Director	Writer	Producer	Editor	Notes
1979	National Priority	Yes	Yes	Yes	Yes	Short film; Also actor
1984	Victoria 392	Yes	Yes	Yes	Yes	Amateur film, Co-directed with Fernando Casttetes; Also actor
1986	Commercial for Murder	No	No	No	Yes	Short film
1991	The Boy Who Cried Bitch	Yes	No	No	No	
1997	Love Walked In	Yes	Yes	No	No	
1999	Same Love, Same Rain	Yes	Yes	No	No	
2001	Son of the Bride	Yes	Yes	No	No	Also cameo role as "Doctor"
2004	Moon of Avellaneda	Yes	Yes	No	No	
2009	The Secret in Their Eyes	Yes	Yes	Yes	Yes	
2013	Metegol	Yes	Yes	Yes	Yes	Also voice role as: "Armando", "Eusebio", "Lechuga" and "Clark"
2019	The Weasel's Tale	Yes	Yes	Yes	Yes	
2026	Parque Lezema	Yes	Yes	No	Yes	

==== Producer only ====
Year	Title	Notes
2007	Aminga, de un pueblo a una ciudad	Executive producer; Short film
2008	Los celulares	Executive producer; Short film
2010	Plumíferos-Aventuras Voladoras	Associate producer
2010	Belgrano	Producer
2015	Secret in Their Eyes	Executive producer; American remake of his film The Secret in Their Eyes
2018	Ián, una historia que nos movilizara	Executive producer; Short film
2020	El límite infinito	Producer; Documentary film
2023	The Extortion	Executive producer

== Television ==
Year	Title	Director	Writer	Producer	Notes
1993	Lifestories: Families in Crisis	Yes	No	No	6 episodes
1996–1998	Remember WENN	Yes	No	No	16 episodes
1998	Upright Citizens Brigade	Yes	No	No	
2000	Strangers with Candy	Yes	No	No	8 episodes
2000–present	Law & Order: Special Victims Unit	Yes	No	No	23 episodes
2001	Culpables	Yes	Yes	No	34 episodes
2002	Law & Order: Criminal Intent	Yes	No	No	2 episodes
2002	Ed	Yes	No	No	Episode "Youth Bandits"
2003	Dragnet	Yes	No	No	Episode "The Brass Ring"
2006	Six Degrees	Yes	No	No	Episode "The Puncher"
2006	30 Rock	Yes	No	No	Episode "Jack Meets Dennis"
2006	Vientos de agua	Yes	Yes	No	Miniseries; Wrote the 13 episodes and directed 5; Also creator and edited 1 episode
2007–2010	House	Yes	No	No	5 episodes
2010	Kathy Griffin: My Life on the D-List	Yes	No	No	1 episode
2011	Capitales del Fútbol	No	No	Executive	8 episodes
2011	Recordando el Show de Alejandro Molina	Yes	No	Executive	Documentary miniseries; 7 episodes
2011	Fronteras	No	No	Yes	Miniseries; 8 episodes
2011–2012	El hombre de tu vida	Yes	Yes	Associate	Also creator; 24 episodes
2014	30 for 30: Soccer Stories	No	No	Yes	Episode "White, Blue and White"
2014	Halt and Catch Fire	Yes	No	No	5 episodes
2015	Entre Caníbales	No	Yes	Yes	65 episodes
2016–2017	Colony	Yes	No	Executive	Executive produced 14 episodes and directed 9
2017	Mini-Beat Power Rockers	No	No	Executive	
2022	Night Sky	Yes	No	Executive	

== Plays ==
- Parque Lezama (2014)
- ¿Que hacemos con Walter? (2018)

== Awards and nominations ==
=== Wins ===
- 1995 Daytime Emmy Award for Outstanding Directing in a Children's Special for Lifestories: Families in Crisis: A Child Betrayed: The Calvin Mire Story
- 1997 Daytime Emmy Award for Outstanding Directing in a Children's Special for Lifestories: Families in Crisis: Someone Had to be Benny
- 1999 Silver Condor Award for Best Film for Same Love, Same Rain
- 1999 Silver Condor Award for Best Director for Same Love, Same Rain
- 1999 Silver Condor Award for Best Original Screenplay for Same Love, Same Rain
- 2001 Silver Condor Award for Best Film for Son of the Bride
- 2001 Silver Condor Award for Best Director for Son of the Bride
- 2001 Silver Condor Award for Best Original Screenplay for Son of the Bride
- 2009 Silver Condor Award for Best Film for The Secret in Their Eyes
- 2009 Silver Condor Award for Best Director for The Secret in Their Eyes
- 2009 Silver Condor Award for Best Adapted Screenplay for The Secret in Their Eyes
- 2009 Ariel Award for Best Best Ibero-American Film for The Secret in Their Eyes
- 2009 Goya Award for Best Spanish Language Foreign Film for The Secret in Their Eyes
- 2009 Academy Award for Best Foreign Language Film for The Secret in Their Eyes
- 2013 Goya Award for Best Animated Film for Futbolín (Metegol)

=== Nominations ===
- 1993 Daytime Emmy Award for Outstanding Directing in a Children's Special for Lifestories: Families in Crisis: Public Law 106: The Becky Bell Story
- 1994 Daytime Emmy Award for Outstanding Directing in a Children's Special for Lifestories: Families in Crisis: Dead Drunk: The Kevin Tunell Story
- 1996 Daytime Emmy Award for Outstanding Directing in a Children's Special for CBS Schoolbreak Special: Stand Up
- 2001 Academy Award for Best Foreign Language Film for Son of the Bride
- 2009 Goya Award for Best Film for The Secret in Their Eyes
- 2009 Goya Award for Best Director for The Secret in Their Eyes
- 2009 Goya Award for Best Adapted Screenplay for The Secret in Their Eyes
- 2010 César Award for Best Foreign Film for The Secret in Their Eyes
- 2010 European Film Award for Best Film for The Secret in Their Eyes
- 2011 David di Donatello for Best European Film for The Secret in Their Eyes
- 2011 BAFTA Award for Best Film Not in the English Language for The Secret in Their Eyes
