= Valeria Bertuccelli =

Argentine actress, director and writer (born 1969)

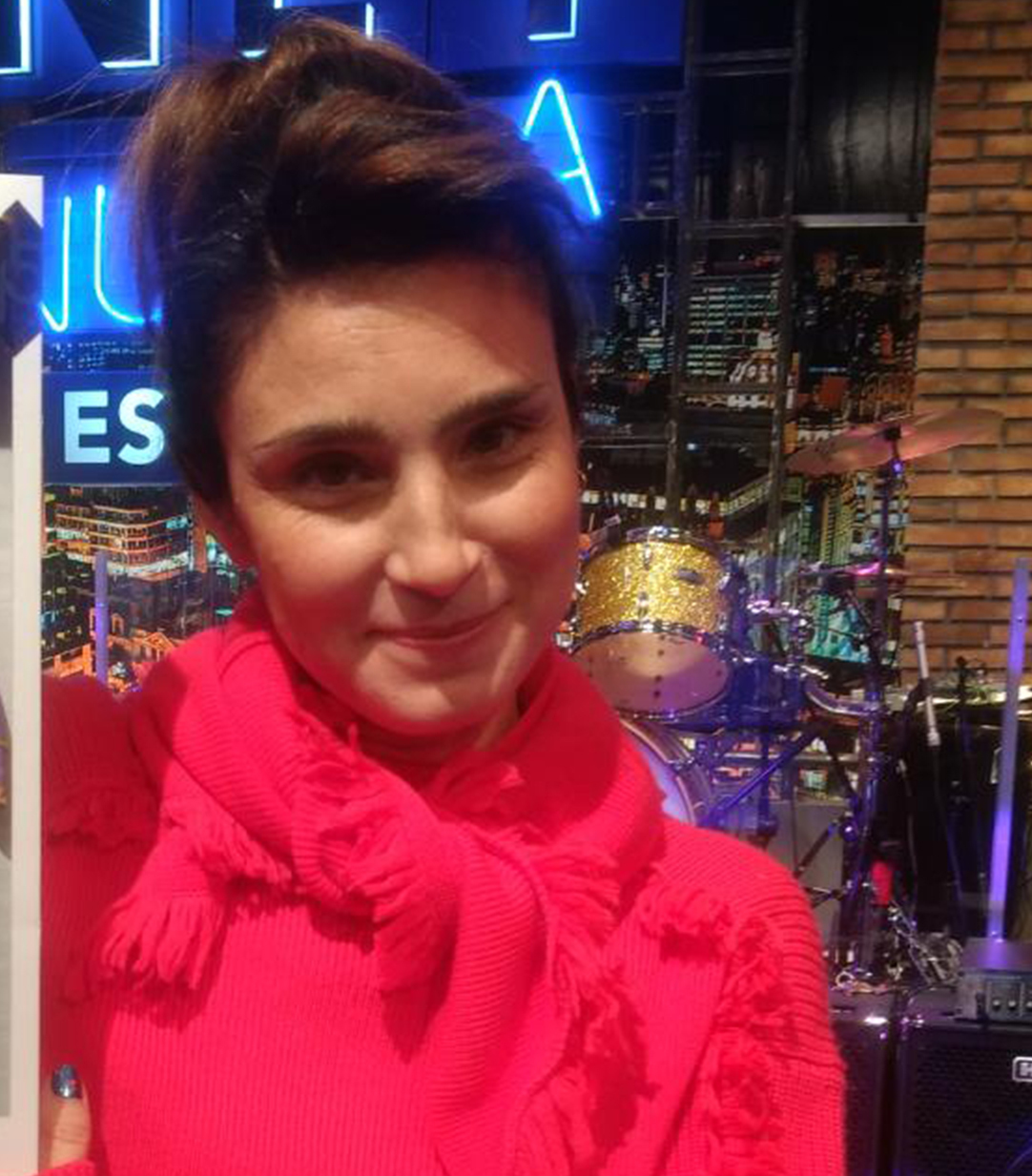
- Bertuccelli in 2018
- Born: Mónica Valeria Bertuccelli; 30 November 1969 (age 55); San Nicolás de los Arroyos, Buenos Aires, Argentina
- Occupations: Actress; director; writer
- Years active: 1995–present
- Spouse: Vicentico (m. 1994)
- Children: 2

Mónica Valeria Bertuccelli (born 30 November 1969) is an Argentine actress, director and writer.

Born in San Nicolás de los Arroyos, Buenos Aires Province, Argentina, she began her career in experimental theatre, and later worked in the San Martín and Cervantes theatres. She was first cast in the cinema of Argentina by director Mariano Galperin, and received a Silver Condor Award for her role in Daniel Barone's Alma mía (2000). She won another Silver Condor for her leading role in Diego Lerman's Mientras tanto, in 2007.

Her husband, Vicentico, is co-founder and lead vocalist of the Argentine rock group Los Fabulosos Cadillacs. They have two sons together, Florián and Vicente.

== Filmography ==
- 1000 Boomerangs (1995)
- Alma mía (1999)
- Silvia Prieto (1999) a.k.a. Silvia Prieto
- Los Guantes mágicos (2003) a.k.a. The Magic Gloves
- Extraño (2003) a.k.a. Strange
- Boca de fresa (2003)
- Próxima salida (2004)
- Luna de Avellaneda (2004) a.k.a. Moon of Avellaneda
- Hermanas (2005)
- Mientras tanto (2006)
- La Antena (2007) a.k.a. The Aerial
- Hotel Tívoli (2007)
- XXY (2007)
- Lluvia (2008)
- Un novio para mi mujer (2008)
- Widows (2011)
- Vino para robar (2013)
- The Queen of Fear (2018)

== Television ==
- "Verdad consecuencia" (1996)
- "Carola Casini" (1997)
- "Gasoleros" (1998)
- "Tiempofinal" (2000) a.k.a. "Final Minute"
- "Cuatro amigas" (2001) (Mini TV series) a.k.a. "Four Friends"
- "Máximo corazón" (2002) a.k.a. "Máximo in My Heart"
- "Mujeres asesinas" (2005)
- "Vientos de agua" (2006)
