= 64th Locarno Film Festival =

Film festival in Locarno, Switzerland

- Opening film: Super 8 directed by J.J. Abrams
- Location: Locarno, Switzerland
- Founded: 1946
- Awards: Golden Leopard: Back to Stay directed by Milagros Mumenthaler
- Artistic director: Olivier Père
- Festival date: Opening: 3 August 2011; Closing: 13 August 2011
- Website: LFF

Locarno Film Festival
- 65th 63rd

The 64th Locarno Film Festival was held from 3 to 13 August 2011 in Locarno, Switzerland. There were 14 world premieres for films in competition. The opening film of the festival was J.J. Abrams' Super 8. Another American film, Cowboys & Aliens, also screened on the Piazza Grande, the 8,000-seat open-air theater. It was presented at the festival by the film's stars Harrison Ford, Daniel Craig and Olivia Wilde and director Jon Favreau. Spike Jonze also screened his hand-made stop-motion short To Die by Your Side.

The festival featured a retrospective of American director Vincente Minnelli. Leslie Caron, star of his film An American in Paris, attended the festival for the retrospective. Other stars at the festival included Magali Noel, Claudia Cardinale, Gérard Depardieu, and Isabelle Huppert, who received the Excellence award.

The Leopard of Honor was awarded to Abel Ferrara for lifetime achievement in cinema Ferrara received the award on the Piazza Grande in front of a 5,000 person crowd. During his acceptance he unveiled a surprise band and began to sing. After the first song Ferrara kept singing and artistic director Olivier Pere was described as standing by "helplessly". The audience began to yell out and boo, eager to watch the two movies on schedule that night, Friends with Benefits and Attack the Block. Ferrara sung several more songs, and finally walked off smiling. The Guardian speculated that, with his rebellious reputation, Ferrara did it just to amuse himself. Ferrara later denied this saying it was an accident and while on-stage he thought the calls to get him to leave were cheers for an encore.

The Golden Leopard, the festival's top prize, was awarded to Back to Stay directed by Milagros Mumenthaler.

== Official Jury ==
- Paulo Branco, Portuguese film producer, Jury president

== Official Sections ==
The following films were screened in these sections:

=== Piazza Grande ===
The following films were screened on the Piazza Grande:

Piazza Grande: Prefestival

Original Title	English Title	Director(s)	Year	Production Country
Amarcord		Federico Fellini	1973	Italy
Breakfast at Tiffany's		Blake Edwards	1961	

Piazza Grande

English Title	Original Title	Director(s)	Year	Production Country
4 Days in May	4 Tage Im Mai	Achim Von Borries	2011	Germany
An American in Paris		Vincente Minnelli	1951	USA
Attack the Block		Joe Cornish	2011	Great Britain
Monsieur Lazhar	Bachir Lazhar	Philippe Falardeau	2011	Canada
Cowboys & Aliens		Jon Favreau	2011	USA
Drive		Nicolas Winding Refn	2011	USA
All Together	Et Si On Vivait Tous Ensemble?	Stéphane Robelin	2011	France
Friends with Benefits		Will Gluck	2011	USA
Headhunters		Morten Tyldum	2011	Norway
Hell		Tim Fehlbaum	2011	Germany
The Art of Love	L'Art D'Aimer	Emmanuel Mouret	2011	France
Le Havre		Aki Kaurismäki	2011	Finland
Red State		Kevin Smith	2011	USA
Scabbard Samurai	Saya Zamurai	Hitoshi Matsumoto	2011	Japan
Sport De Filles		Patricia Mazuy	2011	France
Super 8		J. J. Abrams	2011	USA

Piazza Grande: Shorts

Original Title	English Title	Director(s)	Year	Production Country
Mourir Auprès De Toi	To Die by Your Side	Simon Cahn, Spike Jonze	2010	France
Romance		Georges Schwizgebel	2011	Switzerland

=== International Competition ===
The following films were screened in the International Competition:

Original Title	English Title	Director(s)	Year	Production Country
Abrir Puertas y Ventanas	Back to Stay	Milagros Mumenthaler	2011	Argentina
Another Earth		Mike Cahill, Mike Cahill	2010	USA
Beirut Hotel		Danielle Arbid	2011	Lebanon
Crulic - Drumul Spre Dincolo	Crulic: The Path to Beyond	Anca Damian	2011	Romania
Dernière Séance	Last Session	Laurent Achard	2011	France
Din Dragoste Cu Cele Mai Bune Intentii	Best Intentions	Adrian Sitaru	2011	Romania
El Año Del Tigre	The Year of the Tiger	Sebastián Lelio	2011	Chile
Hashoter	Policeman	Nadav Lapid	2011	Israel
Les Chants De Mandrin	Smugglers' Songs	Rabah Ameur-Zaïmeche	2011	France
Low Life		Nicolas Klotz, Elisabeth Perceval	2011	France
Mangrove		Frédéric Choffat, Julie Gilbert	2011	Switzerland
Onder Ons	Among Us	Marco Van Geffen	2011	Netherlands
Saudade		Katsuya Tomita	2011	Japan
Sette Opere Di Misericordia	Seven Acts of Mercy	Massimiliano De Serio, Gianluca De Serio	2011	Italy
Tanathur	Last Days in Jerusalem	Tawfik Abu Wael	2011	Israel
Terri		Azazel Jacobs	2011	USA
The Loneliest Planet		Julia Loktev	2011	USA
Tokyo Koen	Tokyo Park	Shinji Aoyama	2011	Japan
Un Amour De Jeunesse	Goodbye First Love	Mia Hansen-Løve	2010	France
Vol Spécial	Special Flight	Fernand Melgar	2011	Switzerland

=== Filmmakers of the Present ===
The Concorso Cineasti del Presente, also known as the Filmmakers of the Present competition, showcases first and second feature films from emerging filmmakers. The following films were screened in the Concorso Cineasti del Presente section:

Filmmakers of the Present

Original Title	English Title	Director(s)	Year	Production Country
El Estudiante	The Student	Santiago Mitre	2011	Argentina
El Árbol De Las Fresas	The Strawberry Tree	Simone Rapisarda Casanova	2011	Canada
Hanaan		Ruslan Pak	2011	South Korea
Hello! Shu Xian Sheng	Mr. Tree	Jie Han	2011	China
L'Estate Di Giacomo	Summer of Giacomo	Alessandro Comodin	2011	Italy
Nana		Valerie Massadian	2011	France
Papirosen		Gastón Solnicki	2011	Argentina
Señorita		Vincent Sandoval	2010	Philippines
Solnetchniye Dni	Sunny Days	Nariman Turebayev	2011	Kazakhstan
Tai Yang Zong Zai Zuo Bian	The Sun Beaten Path	Sonthar Gyal	2011	China
The Color Wheel		Alex Ross Perry	2011	USA
The Substance - Albert Hofmann's LSD		Martin Witz	2011	Switzerland
Without		Mark Jackson	2011	USA
É Na Terra Não É Na Lua	It's on Earth it's not on the Moon	Gonçalo Tocha	2011	Portugal

=== Out of Competition ===
The following films were screened out of competition:

Out of Competition: Corpsondences Filmiques

Original Title	English Title	Director(s)	Production Country
El Senyor Ha Fet En Mi Meravelles	The Lord Worked Wonders in Me	Albert Serra	Spain
Sin Título (Carta Para Serra)	Untitled (Letter to Serra)	Lisandro Alonso	Argentina

Out of Competition: Dreileben

Original Title	English Title	Director(s)	Production Country
Dreileben – Eine Minute Dunkel	Dreileben: One Minute of Darkness	Christoph Hochhäusler	Germany
Dreileben – Etwas Besseres Als Den Tod	Dreileben: Beats Being Dead	Christian Petzold	Germany
Dreileben – Komm Mir Nicht Nach	Dreileben: Don't Follow Me Around	Dominik Graf	Germany

Out of Competition: Jeonju Digital Project

Original Title	English Title	Director(s)	Production Country
Aller Au Diable	To the Devil	Claire Denis	South Korea
Memories Of A Morning		José Luis Guerín	South Korea
Un Héritier	An Heir	Jean-Marie Straub	France

Out of Competition – Feature Films

Original Title	English Title	Director(s)	Year	Production Country
1 Due 100 Officine	1 Two 100 Workshops	Danilo Catti	2011	Switzerland
Buenas Noches, España	Good Night, Spain	Raya Martin	2011	Spain
Carte Blanche		Heidi Specogna	2011	Switzerland
Els Noms De Crist	The Names of Christ	Albert Serra	2010	Spain
Glauser		Christoph Kuehn	2011	Switzerland
Gotthard Schuh. Una Visione Sensuale Del Mondo	Gotthard Schuh. a Sensual Vision of the World	Villi Hermann	2011	Switzerland
Inconscio Italiano	Italian Unconscious	Luca Guadagnino	2011	Italy
Let The Bullets Fly		Wen Jiang	2010	China
Milano 55,1. Cronaca Di Una Settimana Di Passioni	Milan 55.1. Chronicle of a Week of Passions	Luca Mosso, Bruno Oliviero	2011	Italy
Ninifuni	Aspiring	Tetsuya MARIKO	2011	Japan
Tahrir		Stefano Savona	2011	France

=== Open Doors ===
The Open Doors section was dedicated to India this year. The following films were screened in the Open Doors section:

Open Doors Satyajit Ray

Original Title	English Title	Director(s)	Year	Production Country
Charulata		Satyajit Ray	1964	India
Joi Baba Felunath	The Elephant God	Satyajit Ray	1979	India
Kapurush	The Coward	Satyajit Ray	1965	India
Mahanagar		Satyajit Ray	1964	India
Mahapurush	Great Man	Satyajit Ray	1965	India
Nayak		Satyajit Ray	1966	India

Open Doors Screenings

Original Title	English Title	Director(s)	Year	Production Country
Aag	Fire	Raj Kapoor	1948	India
Halodhia Choraye Baodhan Khai	The Catastrophe	Jahnu Barua	1987	India
Kanasemba Kudureyaneri	Riding a Stallion of a Dream	Girish Kasaravalli	2010	India
Manthan	The Churning	Shyam Benegal	1976	India
Meghe Dhaka Tara	The Cloud-Capped Star	Ritwik Ghatak	1960	India
Mr. and Mrs. Iyer		Aparna Sen	2002	India
Neecha Nagar	Lowly City	Chetan Anand	1946	India
Nizhalkuthu		Adoor Gopalakrishnan	2002	India
Prapancha Pash	A Throw of Dice	Franz Osten	1929	India
Pyaasa		Guru Dutt	1957	India
Udaan		Vikramaditya Motwane	2010	India
Valu		Umesh Kulkarni	2008	India
Vanaja		Rajnesh Domalpalli	2006	India

=== Leopards of Tomorrow ===
The following films were screened in the Leopards of Tomorrow (Pardi di Domani) section:

==== International Competition ====
International Competition (Concorso Internazionale) – Leopards of Tomorrow
Original Title	English Title	Director(s)	Year	Production Country
At The Formal		Andrew Kavanagh	2010	Australia
Babyland		Marc Fratello	2010	USA
Bez Sniegu	Snowless	Magnus Von Horn	2011	Poland
Bora Bora		Bogdan Mirica	2011	Romania
Brainy		Daniel Borgman	2011	Denmark
Chupachups	Quietly	Ji-suk Kyung	2011	South Korea
Do You Have A Story?		Dario Jurican	2010	Croatia
Domingo Violeta	Violet Sunday	Ana Cristina Barragán	2010	Ecuador
Il Respiro Dell'Arco	The Breath of the Arch	Enrico Maria Artale	2011	Italy
Innocente	Innocent	Samuel Doux	2011	France
Jamgyr		Aygul Bakanova	2011	Great Britain
Just A Perfect Day		Evris Papanikolas	2011	Greece
La Ronde	The Round	Sophie Goyette	2011	Canada
Les Enfants De La Nuit	Night Children	Caroline Deruas	2011	France
Liberdade	Freedom	Gabriel Abrantes, Benjamin Crotty	2011	Portugal
Links-Rechts	Left Right	Tom Willems	2010	Belgium
Mens Sana In Corpore Sano	Mind Sound in a Healthy Body	Juliano Dornelles	2011	Brazil
Neighbours		Josh Levinsky	2011	Great Britain
Opowieści Z Chłodni	Tales from the Cold Store	Grzegorz Jaroszuk	2011	Poland
Praça Walt Disney	Walt Disney Square	Sergio Oliveira, Renata Pinheiro	2011	Brazil
Rauschgift	Drug	Peter Baranowski	2011	Germany
Respect		Benoit Forgeard	2010	France
Ringo		Yaara Sumeruk	2011	USA
Srak	Slip	Michal Vinik	2011	Israel
Séptimo	Seventh	Valentina Chamorro	2011	Sweden
The Balcony Affair		Jamie Cussen	2011	Canada
Végtelen Percek	Infinite Minutes	Cecilia Felméri	2011	Hungary

==== National Competition ====
National Competition (Concorso Nazionale) – Leopards of Tomorrow
Original title	English title	Director(s)	Year	Production country
Alle Werden	Everyone will	Piet Baumgartner	2011	Switzerland
Blitzeis	Flash	Georg Isenmann	2011	Switzerland
Bowling Chez Denise	Bowling at Denise	Kristina Wagenbauer	2010	Canada
Chasse À L'Âne	Donkey Hunt	Maria Nicollier	2011	Switzerland
L'Ambassadeur & Moi	The Ambassador & Me	Jan Czarlewski	2011	Switzerland
Le Début De La Fin	The Start of the End	Jean-François Vercasson	2011	Switzerland
Le Tombeau Des Filles	Girls' Tomb	Carmen Jaquier	2011	Switzerland
Signs & Vibrations		Nalia Giovanoli	2011	Switzerland
Streifen	Strip	Moira Himmelsbach	2011	Switzerland
Tirages En Série	Serial Prints	Kevin Haefelin	2011	Switzerland
À Quoi Tu Joues	What are you Playing	Jean-guillaume Sonnier	2011	Switzerland

Leopards of Tomorrow (Pardi di Domani) - Shorts of Artist

Shorts of Artist
Original title	English title	Director(s)	Year	Production country
Boxing In The Philippine Islands		Raya Martin	2011	Philippines
Sack Barrow		Ben Rivers	2011	Great Britain
The Cloud Of Unknowing		Tzu Nyen Ho	2011	Singapour

=== Author's Shorts (Corti d'Autore) ===
The following films were screened in the Author's Shorts (Corti d'Autore) section:

Original Title	English Title	Director(s)	Production Country
Alvorada Vermelha	Red Dawn	João Rui Guerra da Mata, João Pedro Rodrigues	Portugal
Camelia	Camellia	Marian Crisan	Romania
La Règle De Trois	The Rule of Three	Louis Garrel	France
Le Marin Masqué	The Masked Sailor	Sophie Letourneur	France
Projet Corrida - 5:30	Corrida Project - 5:30	Marco D'Anna	Switzerland
Projet Corrida - Corrida, Uno Sguardo Di René Burri	Project Corrida - Corrida, a Look of René Burri	René Burri, Marco D'Anna	Switzerland

=== Films of the Jury ===
The following films were screened in the Films of the Jury section:

Original Title	English Title	Director(s)	Year	Production Country
Attenberg		Athina Rachel Tsangari	2010	Greece
Belle Épine	Dear Prudence	Rebecca Zlotowski	2010	France
Brownian Movement		Nanouk Leopold	2010	Netherlands
Falscher Bekenner	I Am Guilty	Christoph Hochhäusler	2005	Germany
Ha-Lev Haraev	Hai-Lave Defeated	Tom Shoval	2005	Israel
I Will Drink My Tears		Tom Shoval	2011	Israel
Il Dono	The Gift	Michelangelo Frammartino	2003	Italy
Les Chansons D'Amour	Love Songs	Christophe Honoré	2007	France
Maicling Pelicula Nañg Ysañg Indio Nacional		Raya Martin	2005	Philippines
Mes Copains	My Friends	Louis Garrel	2008	France
Mundo Civilizado	Civilized World	Luca Guadagnino	2003	Italy
Okhotnik	Hunter	Bakur Bakuradze	2011	Russia
Petach Tikva	Pumpkin	Tom Shoval	2007	Israel
Petit Tailleur	Small Tailor	Louis Garrel	2010	France
Re Nao		WANG Wo	2007	China
Shultes		Bakur Bakuradze	2008	Russia
Tannöd		Bettina Oberli	2009	Germany
Up & Down		WANG Wo	2008	China
Vai E Vem	Go and	João César Monteiro	2003	Portugal
Świteź	Swing	Kamil Polak	2010	Poland

=== Retrospective – Vincente Minnelli ===
The following films were screened in the Retrospective for Vincente Minnelli:

Title	Director(s)	Year	Production Country
A Matter of Time	Vincente Minnelli	1976	USA
Bells Are Ringing	Vincente Minnelli	1960	USA
Brigadoon	Vincente Minnelli	1954	USA
Cabin in the Sky	Vincente Minnelli	1943	USA
Designing Woman	Vincente Minnelli	1957	USA
Father of the Bride	Vincente Minnelli	1950	USA
Father's Little Dividend	Vincente Minnelli	1951	USA
Gigi	Vincente Minnelli	1958	USA
Goodbye Charlie	Vincente Minnelli	1964	USA
Home from the Hill	Vincente Minnelli	1960	USA
I Dood It	Vincente Minnelli	1943	USA
Kismet	Vincente Minnelli	1955	USA
Lust for Life	Vincente Minnelli	1956	USA
Madame Bovary	Vincente Minnelli	1949	USA
Meet Me in St. Louis	Vincente Minnelli	1944	USA
On a Clear Day You Can See Forever	Vincente Minnelli	1970	USA
Some Came Running	Vincente Minnelli	1958	USA
Tea and Sympathy	Vincente Minnelli	1956	USA
The Four Horsemen of the Apocalypse	Vincente Minnelli	1962	USA
The Bad and the Beautiful	Vincente Minnelli	1952	USA
The Band Wagon	Vincente Minnelli	1953	USA
The Clock	Vincente Minnelli	1945	USA
The Cobweb	Vincente Minnelli	1955	USA
The Courtship of Eddie's Father	Vincente Minnelli	1963	USA
The Long, Long Trailer	Vincente Minnelli	1953	USA
The Pirate	Vincente Minnelli	1948	USA
The Reluctant Debutante	Vincente Minnelli	1958	USA
The Sandpiper	Vincente Minnelli	1965	USA
The Story of Three Loves	Vincente Minnelli, Gottfried Reinhardt	1953	USA
Two Weeks in Another Town	Vincente Minnelli	1962	USA
Undercurrent	Vincente Minnelli	1946	USA
Yolanda and the Thief	Vincente Minnelli	1945	USA
Ziegfeld Follies	Lemuel Ayers, Roy Del Ruth,Robert Lewis, Vincente Minnelli, Merrill Pye,George Sidney, Charles Walters	1945	USA

=== Special Premiere ===
The following films were screened in the Special Premiere section:

Special Premiere: Depardieu - Pialat
Original Title	English Title	Director(s)	Year	Production Country
Le Garçu	The Boy	Maurice Pialat	1995	France
Loulou		Maurice Pialat	1980	France
Police		Maurice Pialat	1985	France
Sous Le Soleil De Satan	Under the Sun of Satan	Maurice Pialat	1987	France

=== Special Programs ===
The following films were screened in the Special Programs section:

Original Title	English Title	Director(s)	Year	Production Country
Andrei Rublev		Andrei Tarkovsky	1966	ex URSS
Ayneh	The Mirror	Jafar Panahi	1997	Iran
Despair		Rainer Werner Fassbinder	1978	Repubblica Federale Tedesca
Lo Zio Di Brooklyn	The Uncle from Brooklyn	Daniele Ciprì, Franco Maresco	1995	Italy
Schatten Der Engel	Shadow of the Angel	Daniel Schmid	1975	Switzerland
50 Years DSC
L'Autre Côté Du Monde – Histoires De La Suisse Humanitaire	The Other Side of the World - Histoires of Humanitarian Switzerland	David Bernet, Frédéric Gonseth, Thomas Gull, Daniel Maurer, Severin Rüegg, Dominik Schnetzer, Marc-Antoine Schüpfer, Theo Stich, Marcella Völgyi	2011	Switzerland
Anri Sala
1395 Days Without Red		Anri Sala	2011	Great Britain
Answer Me		Anri Sala	2008	Germany
Le Clash	The Clash	Anri Sala	2010	France
Long Sorrow		Anri Sala	2005	Germany
Bruno Ganz - Career Leopard
Der Untergang	Downfall	Oliver Hirschbiegel	2004	Germany
Die Marquise Von O...	The Marquise of O	Éric Rohmer	1976	Repubblica Federale Tedesca
Messer Im Kopf	Knife in the Head	Reinhardt Hauff	1979	Repubblica Federale Tedesca
Claude Goretta - Career Leopard
Bon Vent Claude Goretta		Lionel Baier	2011	Switzerland
L'Invitation	The Invitation	Claude Goretta	1973	Switzerland
La Dentellière	The Lacemaker	Claude Goretta	1977	France
La provinciale	The Provincial	Claude Goretta	1980	France
Claudia Cardinale - Career Leopard
Otto E Mezzo	8½	Federico Fellini	1963	Italy
Hitoshi Matsumoto
Dai Nipponjin	Big Man Japan	Hitoshi Matsumoto	2007	Japan
Shinboru	Symbol	Hitoshi Matsumoto	2009	Japan
Jean-Marie Stub
Dell'Avventura 2/1	Of Adventure 2/1	Romano Guelfi	2010	Italy
L'Inconsolable		Jean-Marie Straub	2011	France
Lothringen!	Lorraine!	Danièle Huillet, Jean-Marie Straub	1994	France
Schakale Und Araber	Jackal and Arab	Jean-Marie Straub	2011	Switzerland
Swiss Cinema Rediscovered
Die Vier Im Jeep	The Four in the Jeep	Leopold Lindtberg, Elizabeth Montagu	1951	Switzerland
Ticino Cinema Prize
Innocenza	Innocence	Villi Hermann	1986	Switzerland

=== Special Prizes ===
The following films were screened in the Special Prizes section:

Special Prizes: Abel Ferrara
Original Title	English Title	Director(s)	Year	Production Country
Bad Lieutenant		Abel Ferrara	1992	USA
King of New York		Abel Ferrara	1990	USA
Mary		Abel Ferrara	2005	France
The Funeral		Abel Ferrara	1996	USA
Special Prizes: Isabelle Huppert
La Pianiste	The Piano Teacher	Michael Haneke	2001	Austria
Merci Pour Le Chocolat	Nightcap	Claude Chabrol	2000	France
Villa Amalia		Benoît Jacquot	2009	France
White Material		Claire Denis	2009	France
Special Prizes: Mike Medavoy
Apocalypse Now Redux		Francis Ford Coppola		USA
Dances With Wolves		Kevin Costner	1990	USA
One Flew Over the Cuckoo's Nest		Miloš Forman	1975	USA
Shutter Island		Martin Scorsese	2010	USA

== Independent Sections ==
=== Critics Week ===
The Semaine de la Critique is an independent section, created in 1990 by the Swiss Association of Film Journalists in partnership with the Locarno Film Festival. The following films were screened in the Semaine de la Critique section:

Original Title	English Title	Director(s)	Year	Production Country
Calvet	Baldness	Dominic Allan	2011	Great Britain
Carte Blanche		Alexandre Goetschmann	2011	Israel
Die Evolution Der Gewalt	The Evolution of Violence	Fritz Ofner	2011	Austria
Gangsterläufer	Gangster Runner	Christian Stahl	2010	Germany
Messies, Ein Schönes Chaos	Messies, a Beautiful Chaos	Urlich Grossenbacher	2011	Switzerland
Not In My Backyard		Matthias Bittner	2011	Germany
Sketches Of Myahk		Koichi Onishi	2011	Japan

=== Appellation Swiss ===
The following films were screened in the Appellation Swiss section:

Original Title	English Title	Director(s)	Year	Production Country
180Â°		Cihan Inan	2010	Switzerland
An African Election		Jarret Merz	2010	Switzerland
Der Sandmann	The Sandman	Peter Luisi	2011	Switzerland
Die Grosse Erbschaft	The Great Inheritance	Fosco Dubini, Donatello Dubini	2010	Switzerland
Goddesses - We Believe We Were Born Perfect		Sylvie Cachin	2010	Switzerland
Ich Bin'S Helmut	I'm Helmut	Nicolas Steiner	2010	Germany
Kampf Der Königinnen	Fight of the Queens	Nicolas Steiner	2011	Germany
Nuvem (Le Poisson-Lune)	Cloud (Le Poisson-Lune)	Basil Da Cunha	2011	Switzerland
Rio Sonata		Georges Gachot	2010	Switzerland
Satte Farben Vor Schwarz	Rich Colors in Front of Black	Sophie Heldman	2010	Switzerland
Sennentuntschi		Michael Steiner	2010	Switzerland
Silberwald		Christine Respond	2010	Switzerland
Toulouse		Lionel Baier	2010	Switzerland

== Official Awards ==
The following films and people received awards at the festival:

=== International Competition (Concorso Internazionale) ===
- Golden Leopard: Abrir Puertas y Ventanas (Back to Stay) directed by Milagros Mumenthaler, Argentina/Switzerland
- Special Golden Leopard (Pardo d'oro speciale della giuria): Shinji Aoyamafor the film TOKYO KOEN and his outstanding career
- Special Jury Prize: Hashoter (Policeman) directed by Nadav Lapid, Israel
- Leopard for Best Direction: to Adrian Sitarufor the film DIN DRAGOSTE CU CELE MAI BUNE INTENTII (Best Intentions), Romania/Hungary
- Best Actress Award: María Canalefor the film Abrir Puertas Y Ventanas (Back to Stay) directed by Milagros Mumenthaler, Argentina/ Switzerland
- Best Actor Award: Bogdan Dumitrachefor the film Din Dragoste Cu Cele Mai Bune Intentii (Best Intentions) directed by Adrian Sitaru, Romania/Hungary
- Special Mention: Un Amour De Jeunesse (Goodbye First Love) directed by Mia Hansen-Løve, France/Germany

=== Filmmakers of the Present Competition (Concorso Cineasti del presente) ===
- Golden Leopard – Filmmakers of the Present - Premio George Foundation: L'Estate Di Giacomo directed by Alessandro Comodin, Italy/France/Belgium
- Premio speciale della giuria Ciné+ Cineasti del presente: El Estudiante (The Student) directed by Santiago Mitre, Argentina
- Special Mention: É Na Terra NÃO É Na Lua (It's the Earth Not the Moon) directed by Gonçalo Tocha, Portugal

=== Best First Feature Jury ===
- Pardo per la migliore opera prima (Best First Film): Nana directed by Valérie Massadian, France

=== Leopards of Tomorrow (Pardi di Domani) ===
- Pardino d'oro for the Best International Short Film: Rauschgift (Addicted) directed by Peter Baranowski, Germany
- Pardino d'argento: Les Enfants De La Nuit directed by Caroline Deruas, France
- Special Mention: Mens Sana In Corpore Sano by Juliano Dornelles, Brazil
- Locarno Short Film nominee for the European Film Awards - Pianifica Prize: Opowiesci Z Chlodni (Frozen Stories) directed by Grzegorz Jaroszuk, Poland
- The Film und Video Untertitelung Prize: Liberdade directed by Gabriel Abrantes and Benjamin Crotty, Portugal
- Pardino d'oro for the Best Swiss Short Film: L'Ambassadeur & Moi (The Ambassador & me) directed by Jan Czarlewski
- Pardino d'argento: Le Tombeau Des Filles (The Girls' Grave) directed by Carmen Jaquier
- Premio Action Light for the Best Swiss Newcomer: À Quoi Tu Joues (Another Game) directed by Jean Guillaume Sonnier

=== Piazza Grande ===
- Prix du Public UBS: Monsieur Lazhar directed by Philippe Falardeau, Canada
- Variety Piazza Grande Award: Monsieur Lazhar directed by Philippe Falardeau, Canada

=== SRG SSR idée suisse / Semaine de la critique 2011 Jury ===
- Special Mention (SRG SSR idée suisse / Semaine de la critique 2011): Sketches Of Myahk directed by Koichi Onishi
- SRG SSR idée suisse / Semaine de la critique 2011 Prize: Messies, Ein Schönes Chaos directed by Ulrich Grossenbacher

=== FIPRESCI Jury ===
- International Critics' Prize (FIPRESCI Prize): Abrir Puertas y Ventanas directed by Milagros Mumenthaler

=== Ecumenical Jury ===
- Ecumenical Prize: Vol Spécial directed by Fernand Melgar
- Special Mention (Ecumenical Jury): Onder Ons directed by Marco Van Geffen, Abrir Puertas Y Ventanas directed by Milagros Mumenthaler

=== CICAE Jury ===
- Art Cinema Award – CICAE Art & Essai Prize: Onder Ons directed by Marco Van Geffen

=== Junior Jury ===
- First Prize: Vol Spécial directed by Fernand Melgar
- Second Prize: Sette Opere Di Misericordia directed by Massimiliano De Serio e Gianluca De Serio
- Third Prize: Terri directed by Azazel Jacobs
- "Environment is quality of life" Prize: El Año Del Tigre directed by Sébastián Lelio
- Special Mention: Another Earth directed by Mike Cahill, Abrir Puertas Y Ventanas directed by Milagros Mumenthaler

=== FICC/IFFS Jury ===
- Don Quijote Prize: Sette Opere Di Misericordia directed by Massimiliano De Serio e Gianluca De Serio
- Special Mention: Crulic – Drumul Spre Dincolo directed by Anca Damian
