= Anghileri =

Anghileri is an Italian surname. Notable people with the surname include:

- Marco Anghileri (born 1991), Italian footballer
- Mariana Anghileri (born 1977), Argentine television and film actress
