= Mar del Plata International Film Festival =

Annual film festival held in Mar del Plata, Argentina

Mar del Plata Film Festival
- Location: Mar del Plata, Buenos Aires, Argentina
- Founded: 1954; 72 years ago
- Awards: Ástor Award
- Language: International
- Website: www.mardelplatafilmfest.com

The Mar del Plata International Film Festival (Spanish: Festival Internacional de Cine de Mar del Plata) is an international film festival that takes place every November in the city of Mar del Plata, Argentina. It is the only competitive feature festival in Latin America that is recognized by the FIAPF, and it is the oldest in this category in the Americas. The festival is organized by the National Institute of Cinema and Audiovisual Arts (INCAA).

== History ==
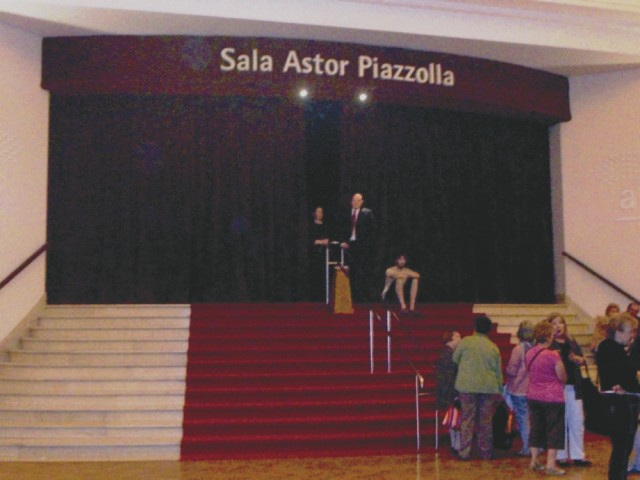
Astor Piazzolla hall, the Festival main venue

Created in 1954 by Jesus Miller, it was not considered to be a competitive festival, it was just an exhibition of selected international movies; during this stage the event was named Festival Cinematográfico Internacional (International Cinematographic Festival).

In the early years famous international guests such as Mary Pickford, Gina Lollobrigida, Edward G. Robinson and Errol Flynn attended the event. The festival continued in this way until 1959, when the Argentine Film Critics Association took charge of running it; during this time the festival was approved and recognized by FIAPF.

In 1964 the festival moved temporarily to Buenos Aires, and the name was changed to Festival Cinematográfico Internacional de la República Argentina (International Cinematographic Festival of the Argentine Republic). In 1966 there was a military coup d'état in Argentina; in 1968 and 1970 the Instituto de Cine took charge of the festival.

From 1967 to 1969 the festival was cancelled because there were other festivals in Rio de Janeiro, Brazil. During the 1960s several well-known guests appeared, including: Paul Newman, Alberto Sordi, Pier Paolo Pasolini, Vittorio Gassman, Toshirō Mifune, François Truffaut, Karel Reisz, Catherine Deneuve, Juan Antonio Bardem, Anthony Perkins, Jean-Paul Belmondo, Maria Callas, Cantinflas, Andrzej Wajda, Jacques Tati, Lee Strasberg, George Hamilton.

After the 1970 edition, the festival was canceled when Argentina entered an unstable sociopolitical period that culminated in the highly repressive military dictatorship that ruled Argentina from 1976 to 1983. There were some attempts to reactivate it, but none succeeded until 1996, when the festival returned with new renovations. Since then there have been several changes. In the first years the event was not held in March; from 2001 to 2007 it returned to that month, and since 2008 it has been held in November. During this stage the festival was granted a 'Category A', the highest class assigned by FIAPF, making it the most important film festival of Latin America. Nowadays, after a history marked by unstable political situations in Argentina, the festival is in constant growth and slowly regaining its historical reputation.

== Awards ==
The main prize of the International Competition had different names throughout the history of the festival, but in 2004 it was definitely changed to Ástor in honor of the Argentine musician Ástor Piazzolla. The twenty-second Mar del Plata Film Festival, held in March 2007, introduced a new competition specifically for Latin American film-makers. Now days, the festival helds four main competitions organised in various sections of the official selection: International Competition, Latin American Competition, Argentine Competition and, the more experimental one, Altered States Competition.

Currently, the awards given by the jury at the International Competition are: Golden Ástor for Best Film, Silver Ástor for Best Director, Silver Ástor for Best Actress, Silver Ástor for Best Actor, Silver Ástor for Best Script, and a Special Jury Award.

== Golden Ástor Winners ==
Year	Film	Original Title	Director	Country
1954	No awards given			
Awarded as "Great Jury Prize"
1959	Wild Strawberries	Smultronstället	Ingmar Bergman	Sweden*
1960	The Bridge	Die Brücke	Bernhard Wicki	West Germany*
1961	Saturday Night and Sunday Morning		Karel Reisz	United Kingdom*
1962	His Days Are Numbered	I giorni contati	Elio Petri	Italy*
1963	Land of Angels	Angyalok földje	György Révész	Hungary*
1964	The Organizer	I compagni	Mario Monicelli	Italy
1965	Time of Indifference	Gli Indifferenti	Francesco Maselli	Italy
1966	Long Live the Republic!	Ať žije Republika!	Karel Kachyňa	Czechoslovakia*
1967	Festival Not Held			
Awarded as "Great Condor Prize"
1968	Bonnie and Clyde		Arthur Penn	United States*
1969	Festival Not Held			
1970	Macunaíma		Joaquim Pedro de Andrade	Brazil*
1971–1995	Festival Cancelled			
Awarded as "Golden Ombú"
1996	The Dog in the Manger	El Perro del Hortelano	Pilar Miró	Spain*
1997	The Tango Lesson		Sally Potter	United Kingdom
1998	The Cloud and the Rising Sun	Abr-O Aftaab	Mahmoud Kalari	Iran*
1999	God's Wedding	As Bodas de Deus	João César Monteiro	Portugal*
2000	Festival Not Held			
2001	It's Me, the Thief	To ja, złodziej	Jacek Bromski	Poland*
2002	Bolivar Is Me	Bolívar Soy Yo	Jorge Alí Triana	Colombia*
2003	Breaking Up	Separações	Domingos de Oliveira	Brazil
Awarded as "Golden Ástor"
2004	Good Life Delivery	Buena Vida Delivery	Leonardo Di Cesare	Argentina*
2005	Le Grand Voyage		Ismaël Ferroukhi	France* / Morocco*
2006	News from Afar	Noticias Lejanas	Ricardo Benet	Mexico*
2007	Fiction	Ficció	Cesc Gay	Spain
2008	Still Walking	歩いても 歩いても / Aruitemo aruitemo	Hirokazu Koreeda	Japan*
2009	Nora's Will	Cinco días sin Nora	Mariana Chenillo	Mexico
2010	Essential Killing		Jerzy Skolimowski	Poland
2011	Back to Stay	Abrir puertas y ventanas	Milagros Mumenthaler	Argentina
2012	Beyond the Hills	Dupa dealuri	Cristian Mungiu	Romania*
2013	The Golden Dream	La jaula de oro	Diego Quemada-Díez	Mexico
2014	Come to My Voice	Were Dengê Min	Hüseyin Karabey	Turkey*
2015	Embrace of the Serpent	El abrazo de la serpiente	Ciro Guerra	Colombia
2016	People That Are Not Me	Anashim shehem lo ani	Hadas Ben Aroya	Israel*
2017	Wajib	واجب	Annemarie Jacir	Palestine*
2018	Between Two Waters	Entre dos aguas	Isaki Lacuesta	Spain
2019	Fire Will Come	O que arde	Óliver Laxe	Spain
2020	The Year of the Discovery	El año del descubrimiento	Luis López Carrasco	Spain
2021	Hit the Road	Jadde Khaki	Panah Panahi	Iran
2022	Bittersweet Rain	Saudade fez morada aqui dentro	Haroldo Borges	Brazil
2023	Motherland	Kinra	Marco Panatonic	Peru*
2024	On the Edge	Au bord du monde	Sophie Muselle and Guérin van de Vorst	Belgium*
2025	Calle Málaga		Maryam Touzani	Morocco

- Denotes the country's first win

== Complete list of winners ==
Year	Winners
1954	No awards given out
1959	Best Film: Smultronstället, by Ingmar Bergman (Sweden); Best Director: Rolf Thiele, for Das Madchen Rosemarie (West Germany); Best Actor: Victor Sjöström, for Smultronstället (Sweden); Best Actress: Susan Hayward, for I Want to Live! (United States); Best Spanish Film: El jefe, by Fernando Ayala (Argentina)
1960	Best Film: Die Brücke, by Bernhard Wicki (West Germany); Best Director: Pietro Germi, for The Facts of Murder (Italy); Best Actor: Paul Muni, for The Last Angry Man (United States); Best Actress: Eleonora Rossi Drago, for Violent Summer (Italy)
1961	Best Film: Saturday Night and Sunday Morning, by Karel Reisz (United Kingdom); Best Director: Henri-Georges Clouzot, for La Vérité (France); Best Actor: Albert Finney, for Saturday Night and Sunday Morning (United Kingdom); Best Actress: Susan Strasberg, for Kapò (Italy); Best Spanish Film: Shunko, by Lautaro Murúa (Argentina)
1962	Best Film: I Giorni Contati, by Elio Petri (Italy); Best Director: François Truffaut, for Jules et Jim (France); Best Actor: Paul Newman, for The Hustler (United States); Best Actress: Nadezhda Rumyantseva, for The Girls (Soviet Union); Best Spanish Film: Cerca de las estrellas, by César Fernández Ardavín (Spain)
1963	Best Film: Az Angyalok Földje, by Gyorgy Révész (Hungary); Best Director: Dino Risi, for Il Sorpasso (Italy); Best Actor: Tom Courtenay, for The Loneliness of the Long Distance Runner (United Kingdom); Best Actress: Wanda Łuczycka, for Głos z tamtego świata (Poland)
1964	Best Film: I compagni, by Mario Monicelli (Italy); Best Director: Karel Kachyňa, for Nadeje (Czechoslovakia); Best Actor: Vittorio Gassman / Ugo Tognazzi, for I Mostri (Italy); Best Actress: Natalie Wood, for Love with the Proper Stranger (United States); Best Spanish Film: Demon in the Blood, by René Múgica (Argentina)
1965	Best Film: Gli Indifferenti, by Francesco Maselli (Italy); Best Director: Claude Lelouch, for Une fille et des fusils (France); Best Actor: Martin Held, for Die Festung (Germany); Best Actress: Nuria Torray, for Diálogos de la Paz (Spain)
1966	Best Film: Long Live the Republic!, by Karel Kachyňa (Czechoslovakia); Best Director: Antonio Pietrangeli, for I Knew Her Well (Italy); Best Actor: Yevgeni Lebedev, for Last Month of Autumn (Soviet Union); Best Actress: Mireille Darc, for Galia (France); Best Spanish Film: El bote, el rio y la gente, by Enrique Cahen Salaberry (Argentina)
1968	Best Film: Bonnie and Clyde, by Arthur Penn (United States); Best Director: Gyorgy Révész, for Egy Szerelem Három Éjszakája (Hungary); Best Actor: Tony Musante, for The Incident (United States); Best Actress: Annie Girardot, for Vivre pour vivre (France)
1970	Best Film: Macunaíma, by Joaquim Pedro de Andrade (Brazil); Best Director: Frank Perry, for Last Summer (United States); Best Actor: Ugo Tognazzi, for Police Chief Pepe (Italy); Best Actress: Liza Minnelli, for The Sterile Cuckoo (United States); Best Spanish Film: Juan Lamaglia y Sra., by Raúl de la Torre (Argentina)
1996	Best Film: El Perro del Hortelano, by Pilar Miró (Spain); Best Director: Zhang Yuan, for East Palace, West Palace (China); Best Actress: Renée Zellweger, for The Whole Wide World (United States); Best Actor: Silvio Orlando, for La Mia Generazione (Italy); Best Script: Zhang Yuan and Wang Xiaobo, for East Palace, West Palace (China); Best Iberoamerican Film: Buenos Aires Vice Versa, by Alejandro Agresti (Argentina); Special Jury Award: Warshots, by Heiner Stadler (Germany); Special Mention: Zhang Jian, for the photography of East Palace, West Palace (China); Special Mention: Pierre Louis Thevenet for art direction of Tranvía a la Malvarrosa
1997	Best Film: The Tango Lesson, by Sally Potter (United Kingdom); Best Director: Ricardo Franco, for La Buena Estrella (Spain); Best Actress: Geno Lechner, for Gesches Gift (Germany); Best Actor: Antonio Resines / Jordi Molla, for La Buena Estrella (Spain); Best Script: Thom Fitzgerald, for The Hanging Garden (Canada); Best Iberoamerican Film: Plaza de Almas, by Fernando Díaz (Argentina); Special Jury Award: Mrs. Brown, by John Madden (United Kingdom); Special Mention: Star Maps, by Miguel Arteta (United States)
1998	Best Film: Abr-O Aftaab, by Mahmoud Kalari (Iran); Best Director: Paolo y Vittorio Taviani, for Tu Ridi (Italy); Best Actress: Yelda Reynaud, for Yara ("The Wound", Germany/Turkey); Best Actor: Regis Royer, for Lautrec (France) / Paschalis Tsarouchas, for Vassiliki (Greece); Best Script: Pablo Torre, for La Cara del Ángel (Argentina); Best Iberoamerican Film: Amor & Cia, by Helvécio Ratton (Brazil); Special Jury Award: Inquietude, by Manoel de Oliveira (Portugal); Special Mention: Mala Época, by Mariano De Rosa, Rodrigo Moreno, Salvador Roselli and Nicolás Saad (Argentina); Special Mention: La Primera Noche de mi Vida, by Miguel Albaladejo (Spain)
1999	Best Film: As Bodas de Deus, by João César Monteiro (Portugal); Best Director: Giuseppe Bertolucci, for The Sweet Sounds of Life (Italy); Best Actress: Reddy Gibbs, for Crossing Fields (United States); Best Actor: Matthew Lillard, for SLC Punk (United States); Best Script: Pablo Nisenson and José Pablo Feinmann, for Angel, la diva y yo (Argentina); Best Iberoamerican Film: Ángel, la diva y yo, by Pablo Nisenson (Argentina); Special Jury Award: Sokkotansi, by Matti Ijas (Finland); Special Mention: El mar de Lucas, by Víctor Laplace (Argentina)
2001	Best Film: To ja, złodziej, by Jacek Bromski (Poland); Best Director: Jean-Pierre Denis, for Murderous Maids (France); Best Actress: Julie-Marie Parmentier, for Murderous Maids (France); Best Actor: Ulises Dumont and Federico Luppi, for Rosarigasinos (Argentina); Best Script: To ja, złodziej, by Jacek Bromski (Poland); Best Iberoamerican Film: Anita no pierde el tren, by Ventura Pons (Spain); Special Jury Award: Shahr-E Zanan, by Ataollah Hayati; Special Mention: for the work of Rosa María Sardá, for Anita no pierde el tren (Spain)
2002	Best Film: Bolívar Soy Yo, by Jorge Alí Triana (Colombia); Best Director: István Szabó, for Taking Sides (Germany/Hungary); Best Actress: Kirsten Dunst, for The Cat's Meow (United States); Best Actor: Stellan Skarsgård, for Taking Sides and Libero de Rienzo, for Santa Maradona (Italy); Best Script: Caryl Phillips, for The Mystic Masseur (United Kingdom/India); Best Iberoamerican Film: Bolívar soy yo, by Jorge Alí Triana (Colombia); Special Jury Award: Caja Negra, by Luis Ortega (Argentina); Special Mention: Annas Sommer, by Jeanine Meerapfel (Germany); Special Mention: Revolution nº 9, by Tim McCann (United States)
2003	Best Film: Separações, by Domingos de Oliveira (Brazil); Best Director: Antonio Chavarrías, for Volverás (Spain); Best Actress: Zooey Deschanel, for All the Real Girls (United States); Best Actor: Domingos de Oliveira, for Separações (Brazil); Best Script: David Ofek/Yossi Madmon/Lior Shefer, for Hamangalistim (Israel); Best Iberoamerican Film: El Fondo del Mar, by Damián Szifron (Argentina); Special Jury Award: Valentín, by Alejandro Agresti (Argentina); Special Mention: At kende sandheden, by Nils Malmros (Denmark); Special Mention: Tristán Ulloa, for his work in Volverás (Spain)
2004	Best Film: Buena Vida Delivery, by Leonardo Di Cesare (Argentina); Best Director: Benedek Fliegauf, for Dealer (Hungary); Best Actress: Nicoletta Braschi, for I Like to Work (Mobbing) (Italy); Best Actor: Luis Tosar, for El lápiz del carpintero (Spain) and Alejandro Urdapilleta, for Adiós querida luna (Argentina); Best Script: Leonardo Di Cesare and Hans Garrino, for Buena Vida Delivery (Argentina); Best Iberoamerican Film: O Outro Lado da Rua, by Marcos Bernstein (Brazil); Special Jury Award: I Like to Work (Mobbing), by Francesca Comencini (Italy); Special Mention: Dealer, by Benedek Fliegauf (Hungary); Special Mention: Touching the Void, by Kevin Macdonald (Great Britain)
2005	Best Film: Le grand voyage, by Ismaël Ferroukhi (France/Morocco); Best Director: Yasmine Kassari, for The Sleeping Child (Morocco/Belgium); Best Actress: Emmanuelle Devos, for La Femme de Gilles (Belgium) and Laura Linney, for P.S. (United States); Best Actor: Mohamed Majd, for Le grand voyage (France/Morocco); Best Script: Bernd Eichinger, for Der Untergang, by Oliver Hirschbiegel (Germany/Italy); Best Iberoamerican Film: Quase Dois Irmaos, by Lucía Murat (Brazil); Special Jury Award: Jab-e Talj, by Mohsen Amiryoussefi (Iran)
2006	Best Film: Noticias lejanas, by Ricardo Benet (Mexico); Best Director: Marco Martins, for Alice (Portugal); Best Actress: Justine Clarke, for Look Both Ways (Australia); Best Actor: William Macy, for Edmond (United States); Best Script: Sarah Watt, for Look Both Ways (Australia); Best Iberoamerican Film: Cinema, Aspirins and Vultures, by Marcelo Gómez (Brazil) and Derecho de familia, by Daniel Burman (Argentina); Special Mention: Be with Me, by Eric Khoo (Singapore); Special Mention: Café Transit, by Kambozia Partovi (France/Iran)
2007	Best Film: Ficció, by Cesc Gay (Spain); Special Jury Award: Gardens in Autumn, by Otar Iosseliani (France-Italy-Russia); Best Director: Marina Spada, for As the Shadow (Italy) and Hong Sang-soo, for Woman on the Beach (South Korea); Best Actress: Sandra Hüller, for Madonna (Germany-Switzerland-Belgium); Best Actor: Carlos Resta, for A Wrecked Filmmaker (Argentina); Best Script: Zaza Rusadze and Dito Tsintsadze, for The Man from the Embassy (Germany); Special Mention: The Greatest Love in the World, by Carlos Diegues (Brazil)
2008	Best Film: Still Walking, by Hirokazu Kore-eda (Japan); Special Jury Award: Involuntary, by Ruben Östlund (Sweden); Best Director: Kiyoshi Kurosawa, for Tokyo Sonata (Japan); Best Actress: Isabelle Huppert, for Home, by Ursula Meier (Switzerland/France /Belgium); Best Actor: Ulrich Thomsen, for Fear Me Not, by Kristian Levring (Denmark); Best Script: Kristian Levring and Anders Thomas Jensen, for Fear Me Not; Special Mention: Regreso a Fortín Olmos, by Patricio Coll and Jorge Goldenberg (Argentina); Best Iberoamerican Film: Los bastardos, by Amat Escalante (Mexico/France/USA)
2009	Best Film: Cinco días sin Nora, by Mariana Chenillo (Mexico); Special Jury Award: El Cuerno de la Abundancia, by Juan Carlos Tabío (Cuba); Best Director: Elia Suleiman, for The Time That Remains (Palestine); Best Actress: Allison Janney, for Life During Wartime, by Todd Solondz (United States); Best Actor: Gary Piquer, for Mal día para pescar, by Alvaro Brechner (Spain/Uruguay); Best Script: Cesc Gay, for V.O.S. (Spain); Special Mention: El Cuerno de la Abundancia, by Juan Carlos Tabío (Cuba); Best Iberoamerican Film: La hora de la siesta, by Sofia Mora (Argentina); Best Short Film: Ana y Mateo, by Natural Arpajou (Argentina); 2º Best Short: "Marcela", by Gastón Siriczman (Argentina)
2010	Best Film: Essential Killing, by Jerzy Skolimowski (Poland); Special Jury Award: White, White World, by Oleg Norkovic (Serbia); Best Director: Aleksey Fedorchenko, for Silent Souls (Russia); Best Actress: Mirela Oprisor and Maria Popistașu, for Tuesday, After Christmas (Romania); Best Actor: Vincent Gallo, for Essential Killing; Best Script: Denis Osokin, for Silent Souls; Special Mention: Chantrapas, by Otar Iosseliani (Georgia)
2011	Best Film: Abrir puertas y ventanas, by Milagros Mumenthaler (Argentina); Special Jury Award: Tyrannosaur, by Paddy Considine (United Kingdom); Best Director: Milagros Mumenthaler, for Abrir puertas y ventanas (Argentina); Best Actress: Joslyn Jensen, for Without (United States); Best Actor: Olivier Gourmet, for L'Exercise de L'État (Belgium/France); Best Script: Paddy Considine, for Tyrannosaur (United Kingdom); Special Mention: Girimunho, by Helvécio Marins Jr. and Clarissa Campolina (Brazil); Special Mention: El lugar más pequeño, by Tatiana Huezo Sánchez (Mexico/El Salvador); Best Iberoamerican Film: Las malas intenciones, by Rosario Garcia-Montero (Peru/Argentina/Germany)
2012	Best Film: Dupa dealuri, by Cristian Mungiu (Romania); Best Director: Reis Çelik, for Night of Silence (Turkey); Best Actress: Soko, for Augustine (France); Best Actor: Ilyas Salman, for Night of Silence (Turkey) / Pablo Pinto, for De martes a martes (Argentina); Best Script: Alice Lowe, Steve Oram and Amy Jump, for Sightseers (United Kingdom); Special Mention: Memories Look at Me, by Song Fang (China); Argentine Official Competition: Best Film: Hermanos de sangre, by Daniel de la Vega (Argentina); Best Director: José Celestino Campusano, for Fango (Argentina); Best Short Film: Ojos, by Pablo Gonzalo Pérez (Argentina); Best Short Film Director: Geraldine Baron, for Hotel Y (Argentina)
2013	Best Film: La jaula de oro, by Diego Quemada-Diez (Mexico-Spain); Best Director: Mariana Rondón, for Pelo malo (Venezuela); Best Actress: Marian Álvarez, for La herida (Spain); Best Actor: Vincent Macaigne, for Age of Panic (France); Best Script: Mariana Rondón, for Pelo malo (Venezuela); Special Mention: The Bright Day, by Hossein Shahabi (Iran); Argentine Official Competition: Best Film: La utilidad de un revistero, by Adriano Salgado (Argentina); Best Director: Ada Frontini, for Escuela de sordos (Argentina); Best Short Film: Espacio personal, by Natural Arpajou (Argentina); Best Short Film Director: Mariano Luque, for Sociales (Argentina)
2014	Best Film: Come to My Voice, by Hüseyin Karabey (Turkey/France/Germany); Best Director: Mathieu Amalric, for La Chambre bleue (France); Best Actress: Negar Javaherian, for Melbourne (Iran); Best Actor: Park Jung-bum, for Alive (South Korea); Best Script: Alice Rohrwacher, for Le meraviglie (Italy); Special Mention for Cinematography: Cavalo Dinheiro, by Pedro Costa (Brasil); Argentine Official Competition: Best Film: Su realidad, by Mariano Galperin (Argentina); Best Director: Adrián Biniez, for El 5 de Talleres (Argentina); Best Short Film: Zombies, by Sebastián Dietsch (Argentina); Best Short Film Director: Gastón Siriczman, for Nueve segundos (Argentina)
2015	Best Film: Embrace of the Serpent, by Ciro Guerra (Colombia/Venezuela/Argentina); Best Director: Ivan Ostrochovský, for Koza (Slovakia/Czech Republic); Best Actress: Érica Rivas, for Incident Light (Argentina); Best Actor: Alfredo Castro, Roberto Farías, Alejandro Goic, Jaime Vadell for The Club (Chile); Best Script: Pablo Larraín, Guillermo Calderón, Daniel Villalobos for The Club (Chile); Audience Award: Remember, by Atom Egoyan (Canada); Argentine Official Competition: Best Film: The Movement (El movimiento), by Benjamín Naishtat (Argentina/South Korea); Best Director: Fernando Salem, for How Most Things Work (Argentina); Best Short Film: Fantástico, by Tomás Sposato (Argentina); Best Short Film Director: Pablo Camaiti, for Gomorra (Argentina)
2016	Best Film: People That Are Not Me, by Hadas Ben Aroya (Israel); Best Director: Radu Jude, for Scarred Hearts (Romania); Best Actress: Sonia Braga, for Aquarius (Brazil); Best Actor: Mahershala Ali, for Moonlight (United States); Best Script: Andrei Konchalovsky, Elena Kiseleva for Paradise (Russia/Germany); Special Mention for Cinematography: Nocturma, by Leo Hinstin (France); Audience Award: Aquarius, by Kleber Mendonça Filho (Brazil); Argentine Official Competition: Best Film: El Aprendiz, by Tomás De Leone (Argentina); Best Director: Lukas Valenta Rinner, for Los Decentes (Argentina); Best Short Film: Murciélagos, by Felipe Ramírez Vilches (Argentina); Best Short Film Director: Mariano Cócolo, for Al Silencio (Argentina)
2017	Best Film: Wajib, by Annemarie Jacir (Palestine); Best Director: Valeska Grisebach, for Western (Germany); Best Actress: Eili Harboe, for Thelma (Norway); Best Actor: Mohammad Bakri, for Wajib (Palestine); Best Script: Kim Dae-hwan for The First Lap (South Korea); Audience Award: Primas, by Laura Bari (Canada); Argentine Official Competition: Best Film: El Azote, by José Celestino Campusano (Argentina); Best Short Film: Y ahora elogiemos las películas, by Nicolás Zukerfeld (Argentina)
2018	Best Film: Between Two Waters, by Isaki Lacuesta (Spain); Special Jury Award: Chuva É Cantoria Na Aldeia Dos Mortos, by Renée Nader Messora & João Salaviza (Portugal) and Vendrán lluvias suaves, by Iván Fund (Argentina); Best Director: Roberto Minervini, for What You Gonna Do When the World's on Fire? (Italy); Best Actress: Judy Hill, for What You Gonna Do When the World's on Fire? (Italy); Best Actor: Israel Gómez Romero, for Between Two Waters (Spain); Best Script: Federico Veiroj for Belmonte (Uruguay); Audience Award: If Beale Street Could Talk, by Barry Jenkins (United States); Argentine Official Competition: Best Film: El árbol negro, by Máximo Ciambella & Damián Coluccio (Argentina); Special Mention: Julia y el zorro, by Inés Barrionuevo (Argentina); Best Short Film: Aquel verano sin hogar, by Santiago Reale (Argentina) and Mientras las olas, by D. Gavaldá & C. Rivoira (Argentina)
2019	Best Film: O que arde, by Óliver Laxe (Spain); Best Director: Pedro Costa, for Vitalina Varela (Portugal) and Angela Schanelec, for I Was at Home, But (Germany); Best Actress: Liliana Juárez, for Planta Permanente (Argentina); Best Actor: Ventura, for Vitalina Varela (Portugal); Best Script: Óliver Laxe for O que arde (Spain); Audience Award: The Invisible Life of Eurídice Gusmão, by Karim Aïnouz (Brazil); Argentine Official Competition: Best Film: Angélica, by Delfina Castagnino (Argentina); Best Director: Laura Citarella and Mercedes Halfon, for Las poetas visitan a Juana Bignozzi; Special Mention: Maternal, by Maura Delpero (Argentina); Best Short Film: Playback. Ensayo de una despedida, by Agustina Comedi (Argentina); Latin American Official Competition: Best Film:A febre, by Maya Da-Rin (Brazil) and Nunca subí el Provincia, by Ignacio Agüero (Chile); Special Mention: Vendrá la muerte y tendrá tus ojos, by José Luis Torres Leiva (Chile); Best Short Film: Plano controle, by Juliana Antunes (Brazil)
