= Toselli =

Toselli is an Italian surname originating in Northern Italy.

It is one of many related surnames with roots in the nickname Tóso, from the term tóso which referred to boys or young men in northern Italian languages such as Lombard, Venetian, and Emilian-Romagnol. The term itself came from the Latin word tonsus, meaning clipped or shorn, which became a term for young males due to the custom of them having short hair. Toselli historically has its highest frequency in Lombardy, Emilia-Romagna, and Tuscany.

Notable people with the surname include:

- Angelo Toselli (c.1765–1827), Italian architect and scenographer, master of vedute
- Antonio Toselli (1884–1954), Italian engineer and politician
- Cristopher Toselli (born 1988), Chilean football goalkeeper
- Enrico Toselli (1883–1926), Italian pianist and composer
- Ignacio Toselli, Argentine film actor
- Pietro Toselli (1856–1895), Italian military officer
- Bernard of Bologna (1701–1770, born Flovitano Toselli), theologian and author

== See also ==
- Tosello
