= The Corporation (2012 film) =

- Film poster
- Spanish: La corporación
- Directed by: Fabián Forte
- Starring: Osmar Núñez; Mariana Anghileri
- Release date: 19 November 2012 (MIFF)
- Running time: 90 minutes
- Country: Argentina
- Language: Spanish

The Corporation (Spanish: La corporación) is a 2012 Argentine drama film directed by Fabián Forte.

== Cast ==
- Osmar Núñez as Felipe Mentor
- Mariana Anghileri as Luz
- Juan Palomino as Robledo
- Sergio Boris as Juan Carlos
- Federico Luppi as Dalmaso
- Carlos Echevarría as Driznik
