= Good Life Delivery =

Buena vida delivery
- Theatrical release poster
- Directed by: Leonardo Di Cesare
- Written by: Leonardo Di Cesare; Hans Garrino
- Produced by: Executive Producer: Leonardo Di Cesare; Sabina Sigler; Edgard Tenenbaum
- Starring: Ignacio Toselli; Mariana Anghileri
- Cinematography: Leandro Martínez
- Edited by: Liliana Nadal
- Music by: Pablo Della Miggiora
- Production companies: La Normanda Producciones; INCAA; Los Irrompibles Producciones; Tu Vas Voir Productions; Hubert Bals Fund; Fonds Sud Cinéma; Centre national du cinéma et de l'image animée Daniel Rosenfeld Films
- Distributed by: Distribution Company (Argentina); ID Distribution (France)
- Release dates: 27 January 2004 (Netherlands); 12 August 2004 (Argentina); 2 April 2005 (France)
- Running time: 93 minutes
- Countries: Argentina; France; Netherlands
- Language: Spanish

Good Life Delivery (Spanish: Buena vida delivery) is a 2004 Spanish-language black comedy film, directed by Leonardo Di Cesare, and written by Di Cesare and Hans Garrino. The film features Ignacio Toselli as Hernán, Mariana Anghileri as Pato, and Oscar Nuñez as Venancio, Pato's manipulative father, among others. The film was partly funded by INCAA.

== Plot ==
Good Life Delivery revolves around the lives of ordinary individuals residing in González Catán, a working-class suburb situated southwest of Buenos Aires, as they grapple with the challenges of making ends meet. It begins with Hernán assisting his brother and sister-in-law in preparing for their significant relocation to Spain. Fleeing the repercussions of Argentina's economic crisis, Hernán's parents are compelled to depart the country. Left on his own in the Buenos Aires suburbs, Hernán finds employment with a messaging agency, riding a small motorcycle to deliver messages. During a visit to a gas station, he encounters Pato, an attractive woman tending to the pumps. Impressed by Hernán's offer, Pato agrees to rent the room left vacant by his brother.

Pato, a enigmatic young woman, becomes aware of Hernán's affection and reciprocates, albeit her motives are unclear. A surprising twist arises when Hernán returns home one evening to find that Pato's parents and her young daughter have moved in, catching him off guard. Venancio, Pato's slick and charismatic father played by Oscar Nuñez, extends gratitude to Hernán, who initially assumes their presence is temporary.

However, it becomes apparent that Pato's family intends to stay. The intricate and lengthy process of Argentina's property laws makes eviction challenging and costly. Venancio and his wife convert the kitchen into a small bakery, producing and selling churros on the streets. Hernán's efforts to evict Pato's family prove futile until he takes matters into his own hands and employs a tactic to frighten them away.

Meanwhile, Pato finds herself caught between her inability to develop a relationship with Hernán and the advances of a handsome young man named José Luis, a patron at the gas station. When Pato learns of José Luis' wealth, she sees an opportunity. Venancio, along with his wife and daughter, make an appearance at José Luis' residence. In a subsequent scene, Venancio is depicted at the dinner table, expressing gratitude to José Luis using a speech similar to the one he used for Hernán.

== Cast ==
- Ignacio Toselli as Hernán
- Mariana Anghileri as Pato
- Oscar Nuñez as Venancio
- Alicia Palmes as Elvira
- Sofia da Silva as Luli
- Ariel Staltari as Beto
- Pablo Ribba as Seba
- Marcelo Nacci as José Luis
- Ricardo Niz as Colifa
- Oscar Alegre as Roberto
- Hernán Ticona as Ramón
- Gabriel Goity as Dr. Linares

== Background ==
The film's backdrop is the economic crisis Argentina faced from 1999-2002. The poverty rate of Argentina grew from an already high 35.9% in May 2001 to a peak of 57.5% in October 2002. In addition, the May 2000 unemployment rate was 15.4%; it climbed to 18.3% in December 2001.

== Distribution ==
The picture was first presented at the International Film Festival Rotterdam in the Netherlands on January 27, 2004. Later it was shown at the Toulouse Latin America Film Festival in France on March 22, 2004.

The film was screened at various film festivals, including: the Karlovy Vary Film Festival, Czech Republic; the Rencontres Internationales de Cinéma à Paris; France; Puchon International Fantastic Film Festival, South Korea; Copenhagen International Film Festival, Denmark; the Biarritz La Cita Film Festival, France; the Chicago International Film Festival, USA; the Valladolid International Film Festival, Spain; and others.

== Critical reception ==
Deborah Young, film critic for Variety magazine and reporting from the International Film Festival Rotterdam, liked the film and wrote, "Argentina's economic crisis furnishes fertile background material in Buena Vida (Delivery), a clever social drama spiked with black humor...Well-written and acted, pic vividly conveys the country's dire straits with clenched-teeth humor and compassion for all. It should benefit from the growing aud for Argentine product...From a low-key naturalistic drama, pic turns into an ironic comedy that catches the viewer up in seemingly unsolvable social and personal problems."

Film critic Ed Gonzalez, who writes for Slant Magazine, liked the film and the way director Leonardo Di Cesare approached the material and wrote, "Nostalgia sweetly and sensitively tinges the sobering film's emotional politics, as it does in Leonardo Di Cesare's Buena Vida Delivery, the story of a female gas station employee, Pato (Mariana Anghileri), who moves in with a young man, Hernán (Ignacio Toseli), whose parents leave Argentina in order to escape the ravages of the country's economic crisis. Infinitely more charming than Daniel Burman's self-obsessed Lost Embrace, the film is a romantic comedy that accommodates the dejected mood of the country's people...where Lost Embrace worried only for its main character, Buena Vida frets for an entire nation."

British film critic K.H. Brown liked considered the film deeply ironic and wrote, "Making black comedy out of national economic disaster, the title of this Argentine drama can only be understood as deeply ironic. No one is being delivered a particularly good life. Rather, everyone is struggling to get by, doing what they feel is best for them and theirs...Straightforward, unflashy direction – one suddenly notices the previous absence of music when a few ominous chords signal the beginning of act three, for instance – is counterbalanced by well-observed and nuanced performances and a satisfactorily bittersweet resolution. If Buena Vida Delivery probably won't put film-maker Leonardo Di Cesare up there with the likes of Walter Salles and Alejandro González Iñárritu at the forefront of current Latin American cinema, it's a pleasing enough way to spend 90 minutes."

== Awards ==
Wins

- Clarin Entertainment Awards: Clarin Award; Best First Work - Film; 2004.
- Mar del Plata Film Festival: Best Film, Leonardo Di Cesare; Best Screenplay, Leonardo Di Cesare and Hans Garrino: 2004.
- Toulouse Latin America Film Festival, France: Grand Prix; Leonardo Di Cesare; 2004.
- Valladolid International Film Festival, Spain: Best New Director, Leonardo Di Cesare; 2004.
- Argentine Film Critics Association Awards: Silver Condor; Best First Film, Leonardo Di Cesare; Best New Actress, Mariana Anghileri; Best Screenplay, Original, Leonardo Di Cesare and Hans Garrino; 2005.

Nominations

- Valladolid International Film Festival: Golden Spike, Leonardo Di Cesare; 2004.
- Argentine Film Critics Association Awards: Silver Condor; Best New Actor, Ignacio Toselli; Best Supporting Actor, Oscar Nuñez; 2005.
