= Pablo Torre (director) =

Argentine producer, film director, and screenplay writer

Pablo Torre is a producer, film director, and screenplay writer. He works in the cinema of Argentina.

== Filmography ==
Director

- El Amante de las películas mudas (1994) a.k.a. The Lover of Silent Films
- La Cara del ángel (1998)
- La Mirada de Clara (2007)

== Awards ==
Wins

- Bogota Film Festival: Silver Precolumbian Circle; for: El Amante de las películas mudas; 1995.
- Mar del Plata Film Festival: Best Screenplay; for: La Cara del ángel; 1998.
