= Gastón Siriczman =

Argentine filmmaker (born 1967)

Gastón Siriczman (born in 1967 in Córdoba), is an Argentine filmmaker, animator, teacher and playwright.

As a filmmaker he directed more than forty short and medium-length films and videos, as well as television shows and advertising spots. His work has been screened in both national and international festivals and has won several awards.

In 2005 he created the Estudio del Bosque.

== Cinematography ==
Among his works are

- Marcela (2009)
- Prelude in blue (2010)
- Nine seconds (2014) (2014)
- Antonio (2015)

== Awards ==
Marcela

- Second Award Short – 24º Mar del Plata International Film Festival
- Second Award Coral – 32º Festival Internacional del Nuevo Cine Latinoamericano de La Habana – Cuba
- Best Animation Short – 17º Festival Latinoamericano de Video de Rosario – Argentina

"Nine seconds"

- Best Director – 29º Mar del Plata International Film Festival – Argentina

"Antonio"

- Best Short Film – (RAFMA Award) – 5º Festival Internacional de Cine de Gualeguaychú – Argentina
- Mención Especial del Jurado de Derechos Humanos – 23º Festival Latinoamericano de Rosario -Argentina
- Primer Premio – 6º Festival Internacional de Cine Político de Buenos Aires
