= The Currents (film) =

2025 psychological drama film

- Theatrical release poster
- Spanish: Las corrientes
- Directed by: Milagros Mumenthaler
- Written by: Milagros Mumenthaler
- Produced by: Eugenia Mumenthaler; Violeta Bava; Rosa Martínez Rivero; David Epiney
- Starring: Isabel Aimé González Sola; Esteban Bigliardi; Ernestina Gatti; Jazmín Carballo; Emma Fayo Duarte; Patricia Mouzo; Susana Saulquin
- Cinematography: Gabriel Sandru
- Edited by: Gion-Reto Killias
- Production companies: Alina Film; Ruda Cine
- Distributed by: Cinetren
- Release dates: September 2025 (TIFF); 13 November 2025 (Argentina)
- Countries: Switzerland; Argentina
- Language: Spanish
- Box office: $73,150

The Currents (Spanish: Las corrientes) is a 2025 psychological drama film written and directed by Milagros Mumenthaler starring Isabel Aimé González Sola. It is a Swiss-Argentine co-production.

== Plot ==
The plot tracks the plight of stylist Lina, who returns to Argentina from Switzerland on a sudden urge.

== Cast ==
- Isabel Aimé González Sola as Lina
- Esteban Bigliardi as Pedro
- Emma Fayo Duarte as Sofia
- Jazmín Carballo as Amalia
- Ernestina Gatti as Julia
- Claudia Sánchez
- Patricia Mouzo
- Susana Saulquin

== Production ==
The Currents is a Swiss-Argentine co-production by Alina Film and Ruda Cine.

== Release ==
Paris-based outfit Luxbox acquired international sales rights on the film ahead of its premiere. The Currents had its world premiere in the Platform section of the 50th Toronto International Film Festival in September 2025. For its European premiere, it was presented on 23 September 2025 in the official selection of the 73rd San Sebastián International Film Festival. Its festival run also included selections for screenings at the 63rd New York Film Festival (for its U.S. premiere) and the 61st Chicago International Film Festival.

The film was sold in France (to Dulac Distribution).

It is expected to be released theatrically in Argentina on 13 November 2025 by Cinetren.

== Reception ==
On the review aggregator website Rotten Tomatoes, 97% of 30 critics' reviews are positive, with an average rating of 7.4/10. On Metacritic, which uses a weighted average, the film holds a score of 79/100 based on 12 critics, indicating "generally favorable" reviews.

Jon Frosch of The Hollywood Reporter deemed the film to be "a lush, hypnotic character study".

Guy Lodge of Variety wrote that the film is "elevated by its meticulous, silkily textured formal construction".

William Repass of Slant Magazine rated the film out of 4 stars, assessing that the picture offers a "view of mental illness as a sensitivity not wholly pathological, but rather capable of reframing and refreshing the world".

Olivia Popp of Cineuropa singled out the film's "dedication to emphasising, in an unexpected way, how generational trauma manifests itself" as its strongest thematic throughline.

Philipp Engel of Cinemanía rated the "monumenthaler" film 5 out of 5 stars, describing it as "neither concrete nor elusive, neither abstract nor classical, but purely cinematic, outside of time and almost outside of space".

=== Accolades ===
Award	Date of ceremony	Category	Recipient	Result	Ref.
Golden Apricot Yerevan International Film Festival	19 July 2026	Golden Apricot	The Currents	Won	

== See also ==
- List of Argentine films of 2025
