= Tosello =

Tosello is a surname. Notable people with the surname include:

- Danilo Tosello (born 1969), retired Argentine football player
- Guerrino Tosello (born 1943), Italian racing cyclistn

== See also ==
- Tonello
- Torello
- Toselli
