= González Catán =

City in Buenos Aires Province, Argentina

- City
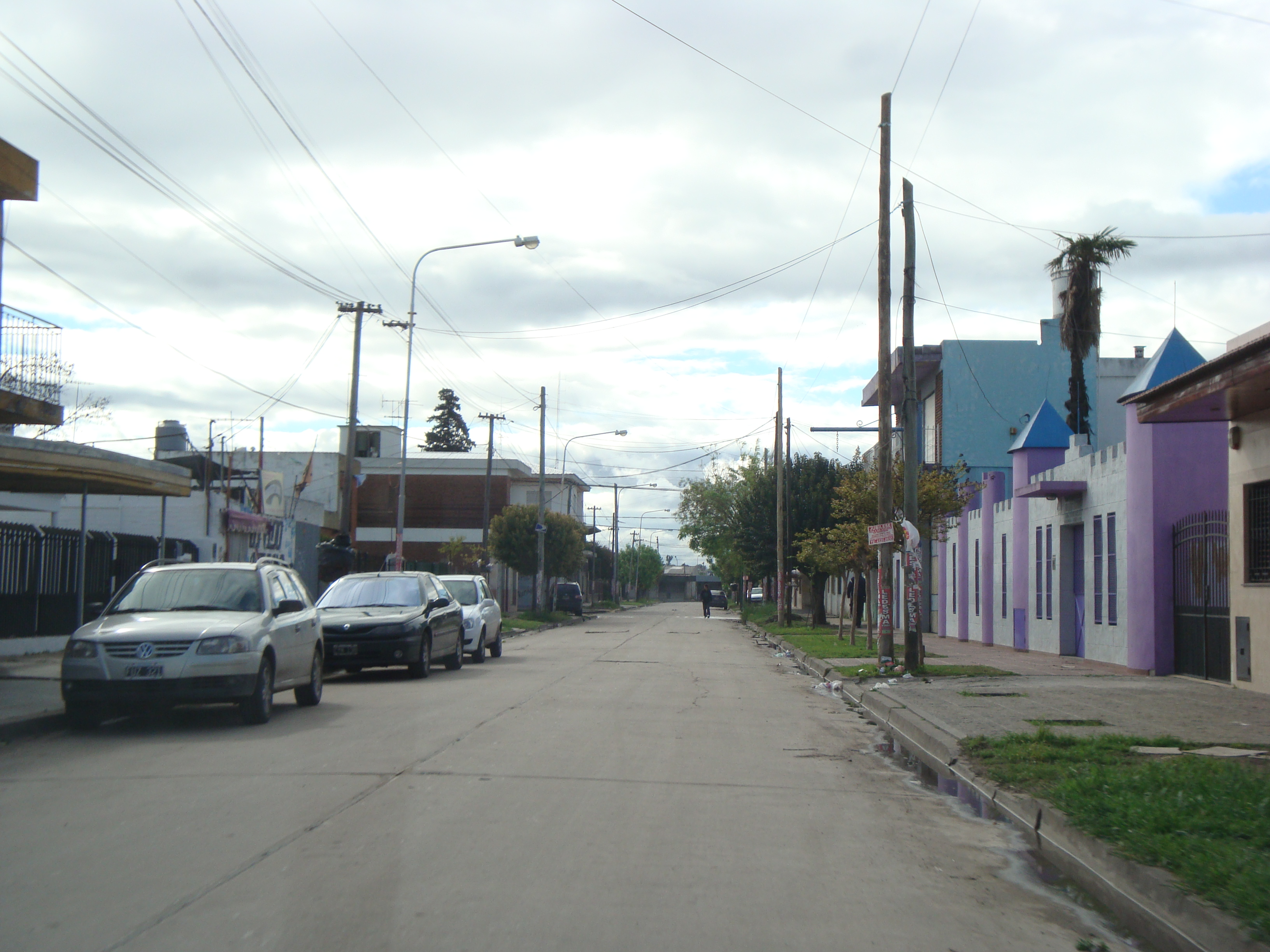

- Location in Greater Buenos Aires
- Coordinates: 34°46′S 58°37′W
- Country: Argentina
- Province: Buenos Aires
- Partido: La Matanza Partido
- Established: April 3, 1910
- Elevation: 19 m (62 ft)

Population (2001 census [INDEC])
  - Total: 163,815
  - Density: 3,189/km^{2} (8,260/sq mi)
- CPA Base: B 1759
- Area code: +54 2202
- Website: www.gonzalezcatan.com

González Catán is a city located in La Matanza Partido, Buenos Aires Province, Argentina. The city is the second-largest by area in the county (52 km^{2}), and the second most-populous. The city is located near the southwestern end of the Greater Buenos Aires metropolitan area, 20 miles (32 km) from Buenos Aires along Route 3.

== Overview ==
The settlement is the oldest one in La Matanza County, and was founded in 1570 as a garrison by a Conquistador, Captain Juan de Garay. The modern settlement originated with the 1869 sale of the land by Germán Carrizo to Dr. Mauricio González Catán, a prominent surgeon and provincial legislator. He set aside the land for recreational purposes, christening it the Finca San Mauricio, in honor of his patron saint. He and his wife, Juana del Carmen Palacios, set aside a parcel for the establishment of the Colegio San Mauricio in 1879, and he died in 1895.

Home to a dairy, an orchard and numerous other agricultural businesses, the town was established on April 3, 1910, by Dr. Enrique Simón Pérez, a dentist and brother-in-law of González Catán. Writer Martiniano Leguizamón had La Morita, his home, built nearby at the time, and the opening of a Ferrocarril Compañía General en la Provincia de Buenos Aires station promoted the town's growth. The growth in manufacturing establishments in the county from 140 to over 1,600 between 1935 and 1954 led to an influx of migrants from the hinterland, and González Catán grew to become the second-largest city on the county. It social problems increased as well, however, and the city was the site of Father Mario Pantaleo's chapel and day care center from the 1970s onwards. The Provincial Legislature declared it a city on September 19, 1974. The city's socioeconomic difficulties were dramatized in a 2004 film, Buena Vida Delivery.

CEAMSE operates one of the nation's largest landfills in González Catán. Opened in 1977, this facility receives waste from the City of Buenos Aires and 14 Greater Buenos Aires municipalities, and has become a source of health problems for local residents; the construction of recycling and waste-to-energy plants was approved by the county in 2010.

González Catán is also known for the Campanópolis theme park. Begun by local businessman Antonio Campana in 1976, Campanópolis was built on a former dump site in a Gothic style reminiscent of a Tim Burton film set and occupies 200 hectares (490 acres) east of Route 3.

== Gallery ==
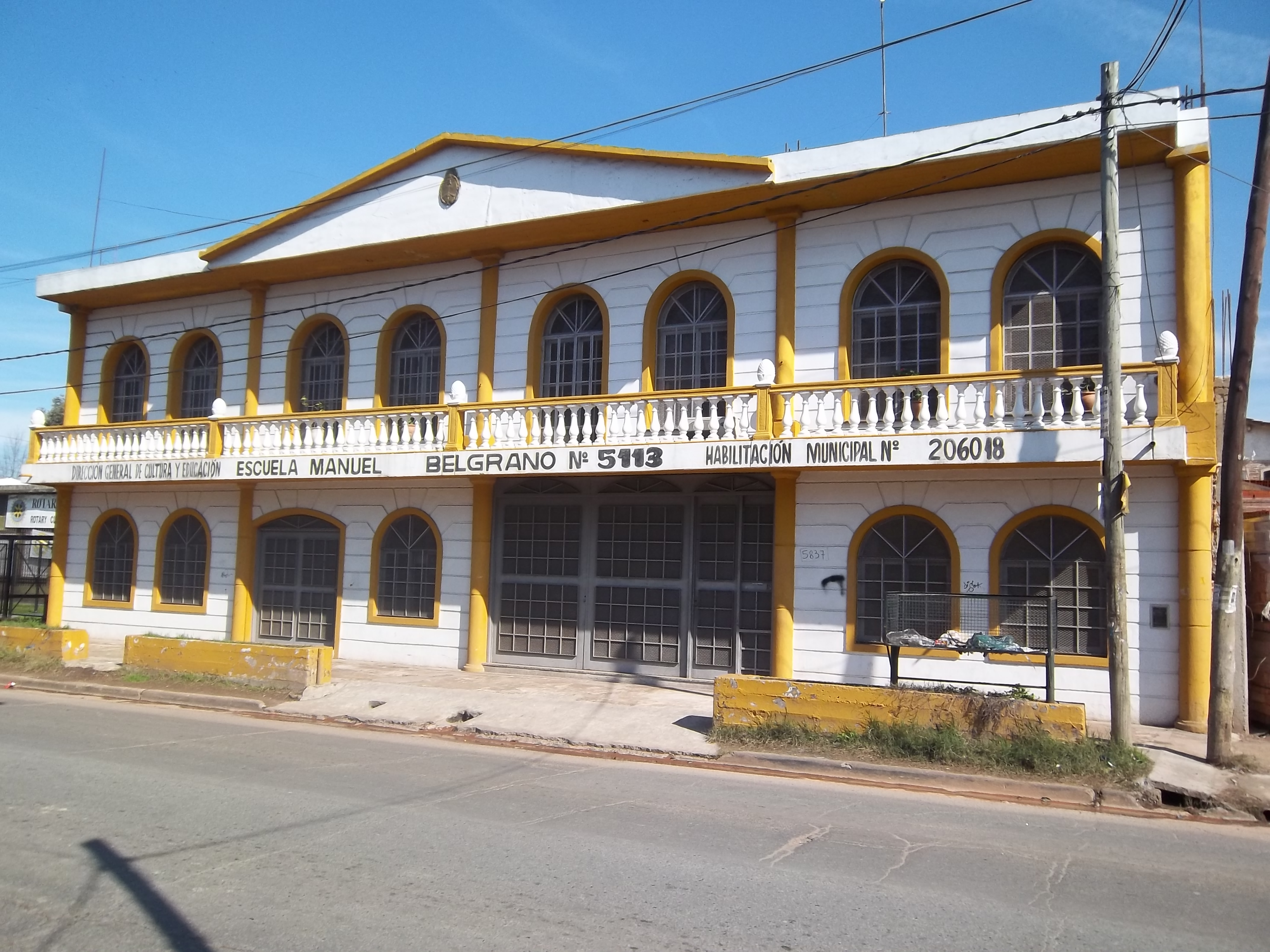
Manuel Belgrano School

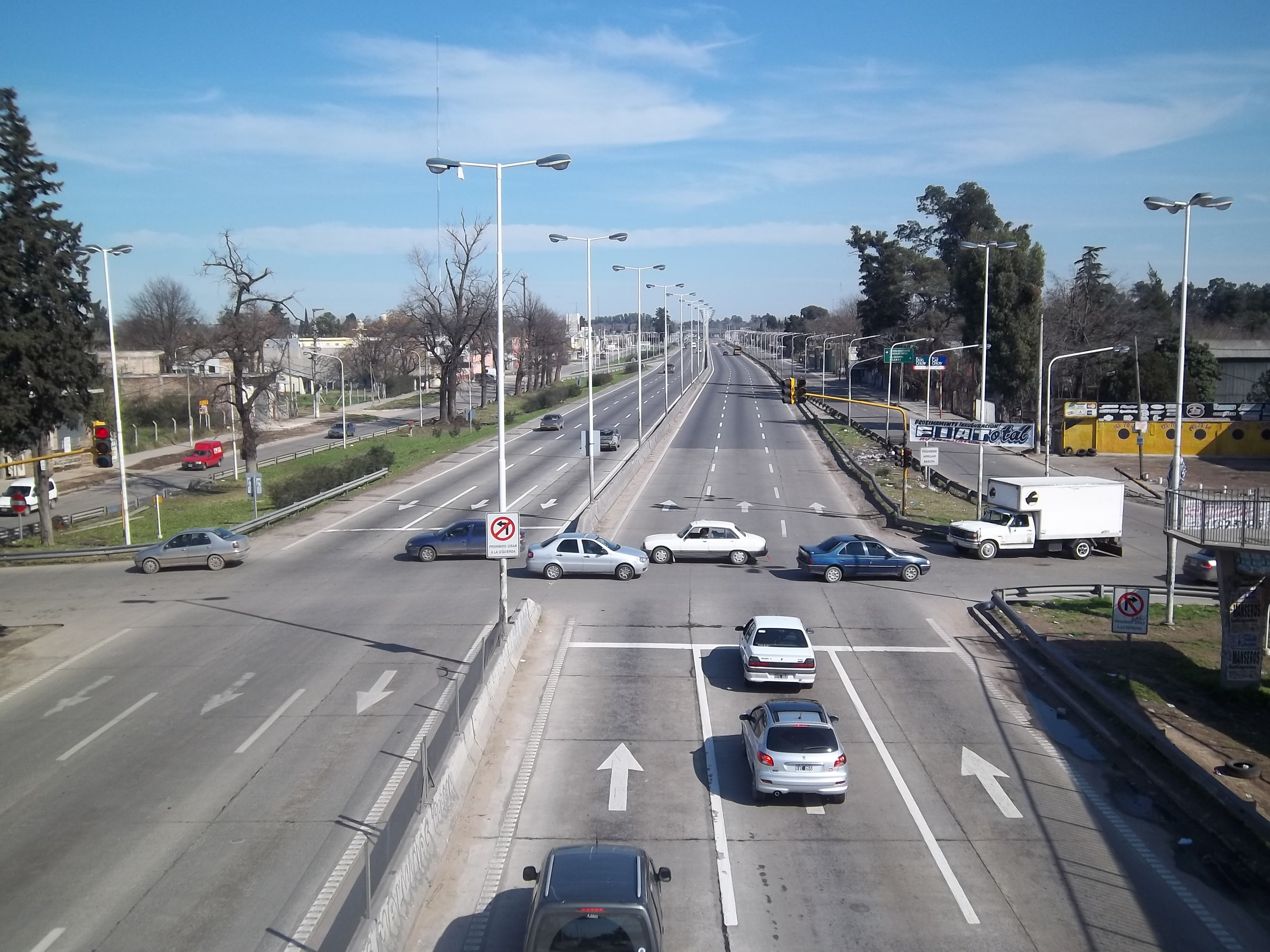
Intersection along Route 3

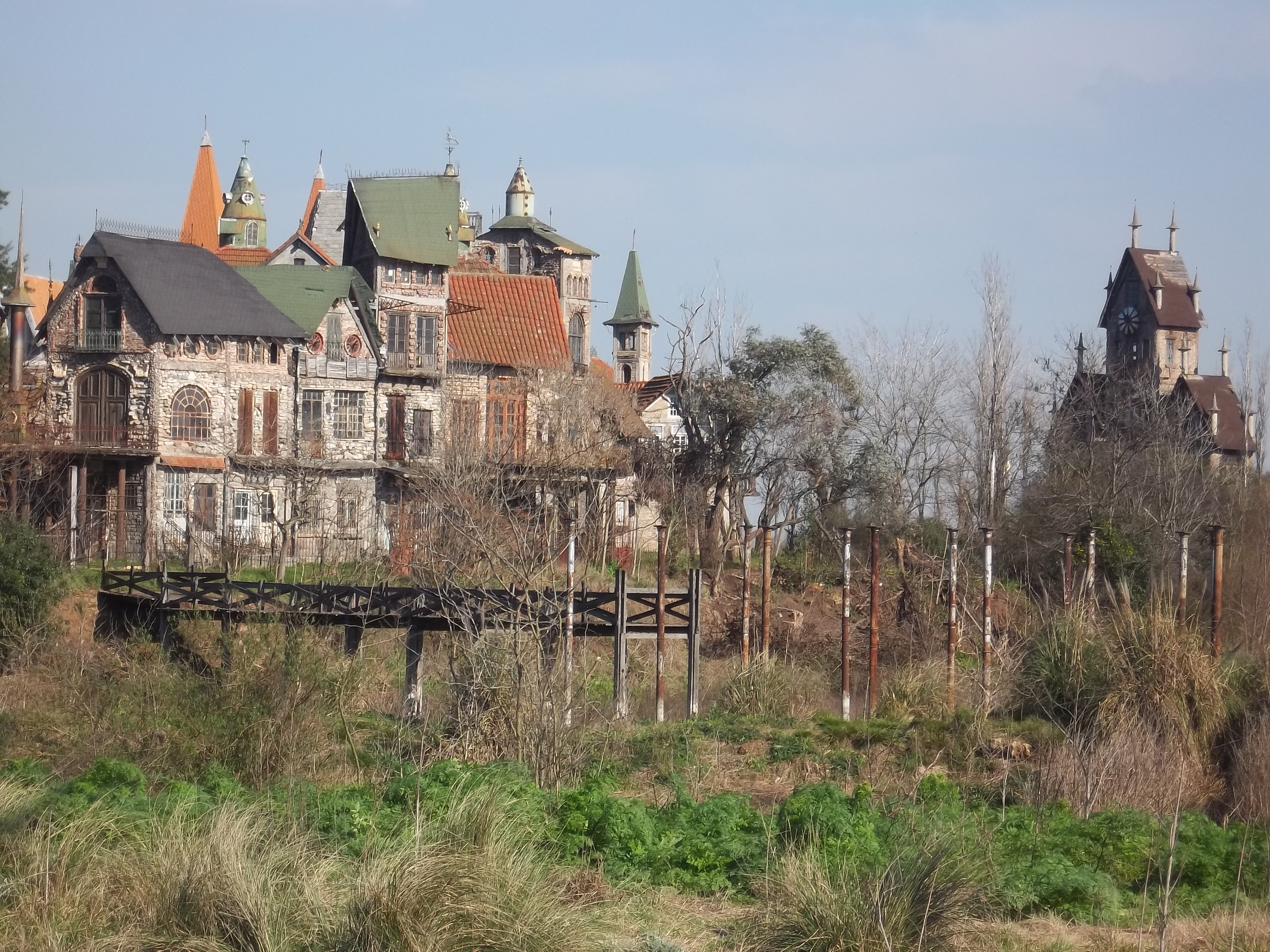
Campanópolis
