= Oscar Núñez =

Argentine actor

Oscar Núñez (1929 – 9 February 2012) was an Argentine actor known for his work in film and theatre. Some of his best known film credits included Nine Queens in 2000, Good Life Delivery in 2004, and Un novio para mi mujer in 2008.

Núñez died from complications of cancer on 9 February 2012, at the age of 83. He was buried at the La Chacarita Cemetery in Buenos Aires.
