= Angel Face (1998 film) =

- Directed by: Pablo Torre
- Written by: Pablo Torre
- Produced by: Pablo Torre
- Starring: Virginia Innocenti; Mario Pasik
- Cinematography: Eduardo Pinto
- Edited by: Santiago Ricci
- Music by: Luis María Serra
- Distributed by: Contracampo
- Release date: November 1998 (Argentina)
- Running time: 92 minutes
- Country: Argentina
- Language: Spanish

Angel Face (Spanish: La cara del ángel) is a 1998 Argentine film, written and directed by Pablo Torre. The film features Virginia Innocenti, Mario Pasik, Enrique Pinti, among others.

The director, Pablo Torre, dedicated the film to the approximately 30,000 people who "disappeared" during Argentina's military dictatorship between 1976 and 1983.

== Plot ==
The story takes place during the period of the ruling military junta in Argentina from the mid-seventies to the early eighties, focusing on one particular family. The story is told from the viewpoint of Nicolas, a young boy.

By mistake the mother of the family is killed by right-wing extremists because they believe she had photographed a civilian protest march and the violent suppression by a military patrol in Buenos Aires. In fact, her twin sister actually took the pictures. She recognized its leader as the father of her nephew and she shows the pictures to her sister.

One day while the sister is out, the man shows up with his political thugs and murders the mother and then hunts for Nicolas who hides inside a large grandfather clock. Nicolas (Mario Pasik) is soon taken by his aunt to her home in the country, where he attends the local Catholic school, where most of the children's parents are in the military.

At the school the fascist bullies and kids who are frightened by them offer a parallel to Argentina's political situation at the time. The boys imitate their parents with dirty tricks toward a boy they call a mixto (born from a marriage of Jews and Christians) who they regularly beat and torment.

Nicolas develops a friendship with the mixto and confides in him about what happened to his mother.

A few years later, after the mixto has been taken away, Nicolas and the other bullies take part in the Malvinas/Falklands War. Afterward, Nicolas settles an old, old score.

== Cast ==
- Virginia Innocenti
- Mario Pasik as Nicolas
- Enrique Pinti
- Victor Moll
- Mariano Marín
- Facundo Garcia

== Background ==
The film is based on the real political events that took place in Argentina after Jorge Rafael Videla's reactionary military junta assumed power on March 24, 1976. During the junta's rule: the parliament was suspended, unions, political parties and provincial governments were banned, and in what became known as the Dirty War between 9,000 and 30,000 people deemed left-wing "subversives" disappeared from society.

According to Pablo Torre, the film's producer and director, the film is loosely based on a story written by Hans Christian Andersen. In his tale, a wolf wants to eat a family of little lambs. One day, the wolf goes into the house and eats the lambs and the smallest lamb hides in a clock and then escapes. La cara del ángel is adapted by Torre for a larger narrative.

== Critical reception ==
Variety magazine film critic Howard Feinstein, reporting from the Puerto Rico Film Festival, gave the drama a mixed review, writing, "Once again, an Argentine pic attempts to probe the national psyche for clues to what fueled the cruel military junta that ruled from 1976 to 1982. Angel Face is most successful in linking the friendships, fantasies, curiosity and vulgarity of childhood with the workings of the surrounding society. Unfortunately, despite a few fine performances, many of the characters are drawn with a heavy brush, and the direction, photography and editing of this obviously low-budget affair are too uninspired to sustain such a weighty load. Outside of a few Latin American sites, draw will be limited."

== Distribution ==
The film was first presented at the Mar del Plata Film Festival in November 1998. It was released wide in Argentina on June 24, 1999.

The film has been screened at various film festivals, including: the Chicago Latino Film Festival, United States; the San Diego Latino Film Festival, USA; the Puerto Rico Film Festival, and others.

== Awards ==
Wins

- Mar del Plata Film Festival: Best Screenplay, Pablo Torre; 1998.
