= Eliseo Basurto =

Fictional character in television series El Encargado

- El encargado character
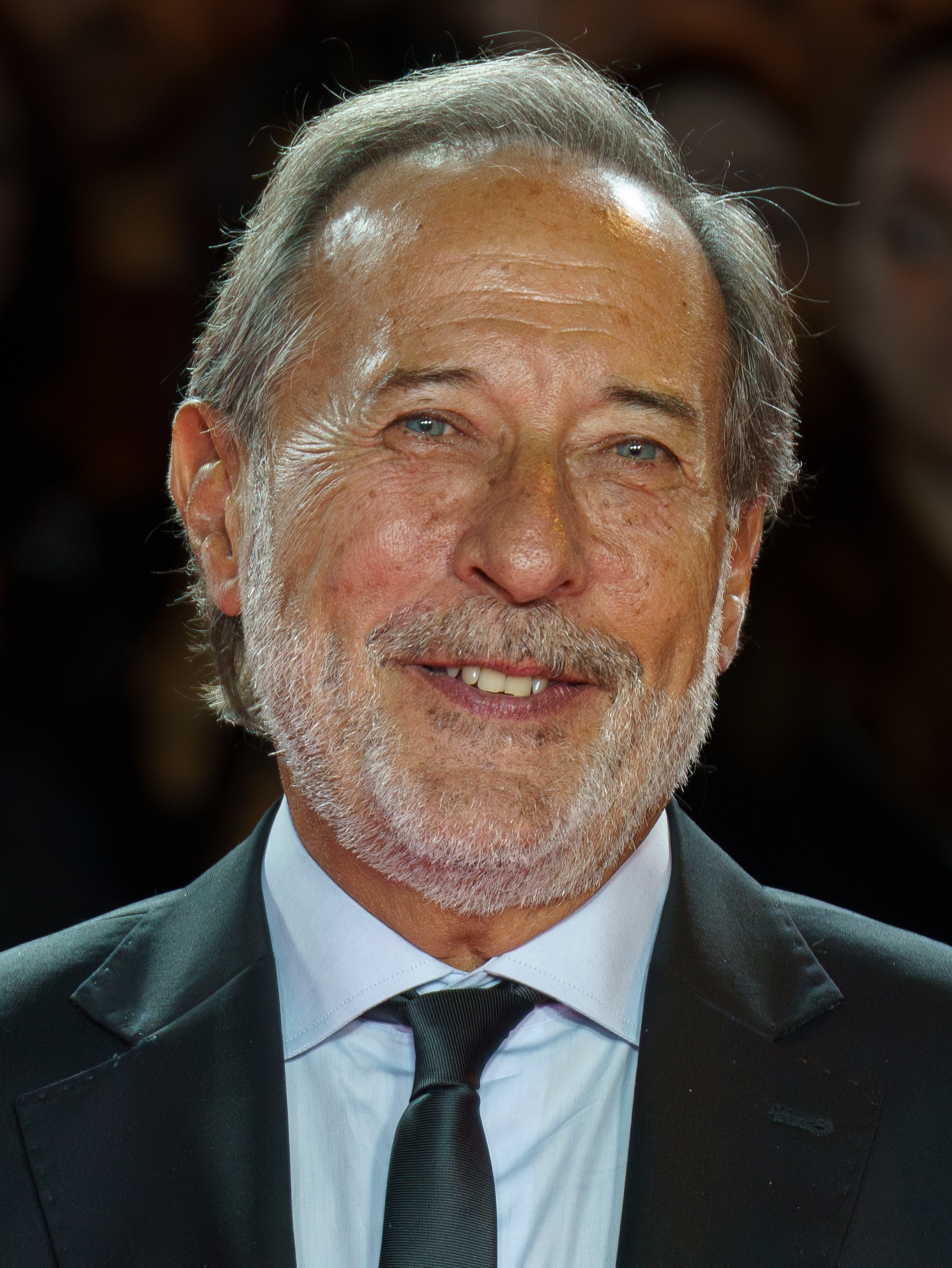
- Guillermo Francella, the actor who plays the character.
- First appearance: "A Dangerous Project" (2022)
- Last appearance: "The doorman little heaven" (2026)
- Created by: Gastón Duprat & Mariano Cohn
- Portrayed by: Guillermo Francella

In-universe information
- Full name: Eliseo Omar Basurto
- Gender: Male
- Occupation: Concierge
- Family: Eladio Basurto (father); Estefanía Roncoli (mother); Teresa Basurto (sister)
- Significant other: Clara Basurto (ex-wife)
- Nationality: Argentinean
- Location: Buenos Aires, Argentina
- Current status: Alive
- Years of service: 1992–present

Eliseo Omar Basurto is a fictional character and the main protagonist from the Disney+ comedy drama television series El encargado. He works as a doorman at a building in Buenos Aires, the character was created by Gastón Duprat & Mariano Cohn and portrayed by Guillermo Francella.

== Character overview ==
The character is characterized by a marked duality in his behavior. To others, he presents an image of a kind, helpful, and cordial person, acting as an efficient manager with a close relationship to the building's residents.

This characteristic allows him to maintain good relations with the owners and tenants, as well as sustain his position within the building association. However, in his private life, he displays manipulative, calculating, and opportunistic behavior. He uses his knowledge of the building's inner workings and the lives of its residents to intervene in everyday situations, monitor the tenants, and exert influence over various conflicts.

Basurto deviates from the archetype of the heroic protagonist, as his actions are often morally questionable. However, his motivations are primarily linked to preserving his job as building manager, rather than an explicit intention to cause harm. In this sense, his actions respond to a logic of self-preservation within the environment in which the series takes place.

== Controversies ==
The series generated controversy in some sectors related to the work of building doormen. Union representatives questioned the characterization of the protagonist, considering that it could contribute to a negative or stereotypical image of the profession.

These criticisms led to media debates about the representation of workers in television fiction. In particular, the Single Union of Rental and Horizontal Property Building Workers (SUTERH) of Argentina, expressed its discontent with the way the superintendent's role was portrayed.

According to them, the construction of the character of Basurto as an amoral and manipulative figure even prompted labor inspections at the building where filming took place, as well as the sending of letters of protest addressed to both the series' production team and Guillermo Francella.

== Awards and nominations ==
List of awards and nominations
Year	Awards	Category	Nominee	Result
2023	Platino Awards	Best actor in a miniseries or TV series	Guillermo Francella	Winner
2023	Produ Award	Best Lead Actor - Comedy-Drama Series and Miniseries	Guillermo Francella	Nominee
2023	Cóndor de Plata Awards	Best leading actor in a comedy and/or musical	Guillermo Francella	Nominee
2024	Aura Awards	Best comedy performance	Guillermo Francella	Nominee
2024	Produ Awards	Best lead actor - comedy series and miniseries	Guillermo Francella	Winner
2024	Martín Fierro de Cine y Series Awards	Best actor	Guillermo Francella	Winner
2024	Cóndor de Plata Awards	Best leading actor	Guillermo Francella	Nominee
2025	Martín Fierro Awards	Best lead actor in a daily drama	Guillermo Francella	Nominee
2025	Produ awards	Best lead actor in a dark comedy	Guillermo Francella	Winner
2025	Martín Fierro Awards for Film and Television	Best lead actor in a series	Guillermo Francella	Nominee
