= Leonardo Di Cesare =

Argentine film director

Leonardo Di Cesare is an Argentine producer, film director, and screenplay writer.

He works in the cinema of Argentina.

His first film Buena Vida Delivey was a huge success in film festivals and was well received by film critics.

== Filmography ==
Director, producer and writer

- Buena Vida Delivery (2004)

== Awards ==
Wins

- Clarin Entertainment Awards: Clarin Award; Best First Work - Film; 2004.
- Mar del Plata Film Festival: Best Film, Leonardo Di Cesare; Best Screenplay, Leonardo Di Cesare and Hans Garrino: 2004.
- Toulouse Latin America Film Festival, France: Grand Prix; Leonardo Di Cesare; 2004.
- Valladolid International Film Festival, Spain: Best New Director, Leonardo Di Cesare; 2004.
- Argentine Film Critics Association Awards: Silver Condor; Best First Film, Leonardo Di Cesare; Best Original Screenplay, Leonardo Di Cesare and Hans Garrino; 2005.
