= The Ignorance of Blood (film) =

- Film poster
- Spanish: La ignorancia de la sangre
- Directed by: Manuel Gómez Pereira
- Screenplay by: Nicolás Saad
- Based on: The Ignorance of Blood by Robert Wilson
- Produced by: Gerardo Herrero
- Starring: Juan Diego Botto; Paz Vega; Alberto San Juan; Cuca Escribano; Francesc Garrido
- Cinematography: Aitor Mantxola
- Edited by: José Salcedo
- Music by: Federico Jusid
- Production companies: HATIMI Production; Hernández y Fernández Producciones Cinematográficas; Maestranza Films; Televisión Española; Tornasol Films
- Distributed by: Film Movement; Latido Films
- Release date: 7 November 2014 (Seville)
- Running time: 109 min
- Country: Spain

The Ignorance of Blood (Spanish: La ignorancia de la sangre) is a 2014 Spanish thriller film directed by Manuel Gómez Pereira and written by Nicolás Saad which stars Juan Diego Botto and Paz Vega alongside Alberto San Juan, Cuca Escribano and Francesc Garrido.

== Cast ==
- Juan Diego Botto as Falcón
- Paz Vega as Consuelo
- Alberto San Juan as Yacub
- Cuca Escribano as Cristina Ferrera
- Francesc Garrido as Pablo
- Hamza Zaidi as Abdulá
- Marco Corrientes Biggie as Dario
- Laura Ramos as Marisa
- Saïd El Mouden as Mustafá Barakat
- Pablo Martín as Belenki
- Pilar Mayo as Rita
- Vladimir Cruz as Cubano
- María Alfonsa Rosso as Mustafá Barakat's mother
- Jaroslaw Bielski as Vasili Lukyanov
- Sebastián Haro as Superintendent Elvira
- Algis A. Pinedo as Leonid Revnik
- Mariví Carrillo as Consuelo
- Farah Hamed as Saná
- Lina Madueño as Leila
- Fran Millán as Vicente Cortés
- Francisco Campos as Civil Guard
- Rolando Raimjanov as Alexei
- Ken Appledorn as TV journalist
- Latifa Bouali as TV journalist
- Francisco Javier García as police man
- Marta Verdugo as Pablo's daughter
- Ignacio Herráez as hired assassin
- Dacio Caballero as kidnapper
