= El encargado =

- Promotional release poster
- Genre: Comedy drama
- Created by: Mariano Cohn; Gastón Duprat
- Written by: Leonardo Di Cesare; Alejandro Angelini; Jerónimo Carranza; Mariano Cohn; Gastón Duprat; Leonardo D'Espósito; Emanuel Diez; Juan José Becerra; Diego Bliffeld; Martín Bustos
- Directed by: Mariano Cohn; Gastón Duprat; Jerónimo Carranza; Diego Bliffeld
- Starring: Guillermo Francella; Gabriel Goity; Moro Anghileri; Gastón Cocchiarale; Pochi Ducasse; María Abadi; Martín Slipak; Manuel Vicente
- Composers: Alejandro Kauderer; Ignacio Gbriel
- Country of origin: Argentina
- Original language: Spanish
- No. of seasons: 4
- No. of episodes: 32

Production
- Executive producers: César Markus; Claudio Sambi; Franco Vilche; Mariana Pérez; Leonardo Aranguibel; Fernando Barbosa
- Producers: Agustín Pichot; Juan Makintach; Fernando Rizzi
- Production location: Buenos Aires
- Cinematography: Rodrigo Pulpeiro
- Editor: Luis Barros
- Running time: 27–39 minutes
- Production company: Pampa Films

Original release
- Network: Star+ (2022–2023); Disney+ (since 2024)
- Release: 26 October 2022 – present

El encargado (English: The Boss) is an Argentine comedy drama television series created by Mariano Cohn and Gastón Duprat originally for Star+. Guillermo Francella stars in the lead role of Eliseo, a doorman at a high-class apartment building in Belgrano, Buenos Aires, who deals with some problems with the neighbors who don't want him anymore as doorman and want to remove his job. To avoid this, he is resorting to unethical moves to keep his job, like invading the privacy of the owners of the apartments. The supporting cast includes Gabriel Goity, Gastón Cocchiarale, and Pochi Ducasse, alongside Moro Anghileri in season one, María Abadi and Martín Slipak in the second season, and Manuel Vicente in season three after recurring in the previous seasons.

The series was released on Star+ in Latin America on 26 October 2022, while it is available on Hulu for the United States and on Disney+ for Europe. A second season was announced in November 2022 and was released on 29 November 2023. The same month, a third season was confirmed, which premiered with its first two episodes on 19 July 2024 on Disney+ following its fusion with Star+ in Latin America, concluding on 23 August.

== Premise ==
The series follows Eliseo, the manager of an upscale residential building, who secretly abuses his position for spying and meddling with the lives of the residents. While masking his true intentions and putting on a facade of kindness and diligence, he deceitfully manipulates them for his own gain. In the first season, Eliseo thwarts a condo board's plan to replace his living quarters with a rooftop pool. The second season pits him against Lucila Morris, a new tenant whose transparency efforts threaten his control. In the third season, he battles union protests and legal challenges after launching a shady doorman startup.

== Cast and characters ==
=== Main ===
- Guillermo Francella as Eliseo Basurto
- Gabriel Goity as Matías Zambrano
- Moro Anghileri as Paola (season 1, guest season 4)
- Gastón Cocchiarale as Miguel
- Pochi Ducasse as Beba Montes de Oca (seasons 1–3)
- María Abadi as Lucila Morris (season 2, guest season 4)
- Martín Slipak as Maxi (season 2, guest season 4)
- Manuel Vicente as Gómez (seasons 3–4, recurring seasons 1–2)

=== Recurring ===
- Darío Barassi as Gabriel (seasons 1–3)
- Malena Sánchez as Florencia (season 1, guest seasons 2, 4)
- Magela Zanotta as María Pía
- Lucas García Pedano as Thiago (season 1)
- Mirta Busnelli as Tatiana Yrigoyen (season 1, guest season 4)
- Adriana Aizemberg as Consuelo Salustri (season 1, guest season 4)
- Jorge D'Elía as Enrique Salustri (season 1, guest season 4)
- Mariano Argento as Renato Di Lella (season 1, guest seasons 2–4)
- Alejandro Paker as Mario Messina
- Daniel Aráoz as Froilán (seasons 3–4)
- Alan Sabbagh as Nacho (season 3, guest seasons 1, 4)
- Benjamín Vicuña as Shuster (season 3, guest season 4)

=== Guest ===
==== Introduced in season 1 ====
- Viviana Puerta as Romina Zambrano
- Micaela Riera as Marina
- Diego De Paula as Germán Echagüe
- Daniel Miglioranza as Ricardo Galurdian
- Fabián Arenillas as Hugo Martínez
- Miriam Odorico as Susana
- Romina Pinto as Carola Echagüe
- Agus Barrasa as Eugenia
- Azul Fernández as Chiara Di Lella
- Facundo Calvo as Augusto
- Martín Seefeld as Ariel / Jordi
- Francisco Andrade as Rómulo
- Sophie Tirouflet as Juliette
- Alma Gandini as Lorena
- Sofía Palomino as Alejandra
- Camila Pizzo as Victoria Slavsky
- Martín Stark as Pablo Slavsky
- Nati Jota as Cony Musel
- Luis Brandoni as Polaco
- René Bertrand as Rubino
- Marcelo D'Andrea as Basavilbaso
- Dani "La Chepi" as Muriel Baldini

==== Introduced in season 2 ====
- Eugenia "China" Suárez as Ángeles
- Norman Briski as Juan
- Diego Torres as Ventura
- Thomas Nicolás Tobar "Rusherking" as Bautista
- Cumelén Sanz as Agustina Morris

==== Introduced in season 3 ====
- José María Listorti as Morales
- Claudia Fontán as Clarita

== Episodes ==
Season	Episodes	Originally released		
Season	Episodes	First released	Last released	Network
1	11	26 October 2022		Star+
2	7	29 November 2023		Star+
3	7	19 July 2024	23 August 2024	Disney+
4	7	30 April 2026		Disney+

=== Season 1 (2022) ===
No. overall	No. in season	Title	Original release date
1	1	"A Dangerous Project" (Un proyecto peligroso)	26 October 2022
2	2	"A Sympathetic Move" (Una acción solidaria)	26 October 2022
3	3	"A Tourist in Buenos Aires" (Un turista en Buenos Aires)	26 October 2022
4	4	"A Lover for Zambrano" (Una amante para Zambrano)	26 October 2022
5	5	"Surprise Visit" (Visita sorpresa)	26 October 2022
6	6	"Night Driver" (Chofer nocturno)	26 October 2022
7	7	"Therapeutic Companion" (Acompañante terapéutico)	26 October 2022
8	8	"Sabotage in the Engine Room" (Sabotaje en la sala de máquinas)	26 October 2022
9	9	"The Squatter in 5B" (El ocupa del 5B)	26 October 2022
10	10	"The Moment of Truth" (La hora de la verdad)	26 October 2022
11	11	"The Phoenix" (El ave fénix)	26 October 2022

=== Season 2 (2023) ===
No. overall	No. in season	Title	Original release date
12	1	"A Woman of Solidarity" (Una mujer solidaria)	29 November 2023
13	2	"An Unexpected Alliance" (Una alianza inesperada)	29 November 2023
14	3	"Just a Little Scare" (Un pequeño susto)	29 November 2023
15	4	"The Last Goodbye" (El último adiós)	29 November 2023
16	5	"Surprise Occurrence" (Allanamiento sorpresa)	29 November 2023
17	6	"Medical Assessment" (Junta médica)	29 November 2023
18	7	"Olives for Everyone" (Aceitunas para todos)	29 November 2023

=== Season 3 (2024) ===
No. overall	No. in season	Title	Original release date
19	1	"The Convention" (La convención)	19 July 2024
20	2	"Basurto Integrated Solutions" (Soluciones Integrales Basurto)	19 July 2024
21	3	"Well Then..." (Y bueh...)	26 July 2024
22	4	"A Second Chance" (Una segunda oportunidad)	2 August 2024
23	5	"A Peck on the Lips" (Piquito)	9 August 2024
24	6	"Supercide" (Portericidio)	16 August 2024
25	7	"Eliseo versus the Argentine State" (Eliseo versus el Estado Nacional Argentino)	23 August 2024

=== Season 4 (2026) ===
No. overall	No. in season	Title	Original release date
26	1	"A Green Buck" (Un palo verde)	30 April 2026
27	2	"Operation Basurto" (Operación Basurto)	30 April 2026
28	3	"The Perimeter" (La perimetral)	30 April 2026
29	4	"Pampa and the Way" (Pampa y la vía)	30 April 2026
30	5	"The Heir" (El heredero)	30 April 2026
31	6	"The Last Wish" (El último deseo)	30 April 2026
32	7	"The Little Heaven of the Doormen" (El cielito de los encargados)	30 April 2026
