= Nicolás Saad =

Nicolás Saad (born 1970 in Buenos Aires) is an Argentine film director, screenplay writer, and film editor.

He works in the cinema of Argentina.

Saad is a graduate of Argentina's primary film school, the Universidad del Cine.

== Filmography ==
Director

- Mala época (1998)
- La Piel de la gallina (1995)
- Un Ojo en la ruta (1993)

Writer

- La ignorancia de la sangre (2014)
- Atlas de geografía humana (2007)
- Mala época (1998)
- La Piel de la gallina (1995)
- Un Ojo en la ruta (1993)

Editing

- La Piel de la gallina (1995)
