= The Strawberry Tree =

- Spanish: El árbol de las fresas
- Directed by: Simone Rapisarda Casanova
- Release date: August 2011 (Locarno)
- Running time: 71 minutes
- Countries: Cuba; Canada; Italy
- Language: Spanish

The Strawberry Tree (Spanish: El árbol de las fresas) is a 2011 experimental film directed by Simone Rapisarda Casanova. The film premiered at the 2011 Locarno Film Festival.

== Subject ==
A year after Hurricane Ike swept their village away, fishermen from Juan Antonio, Cuba, recall their vanished homes and daily lives. Their memories call forth images that had been shot just a few days before the devastation. However, the ethnographic documentary film that ensues is neither predictable nor conventional. For the filmmaker-ethnographer has rejected the use of scripts of any kind and has become entangled in a paradoxical dialogue with his subjects. The poor yet educated Cuban fishermen prove to be familiar with ethnography and documentary film techniques and continuously interact with the filmmaker. The traditional fly-on-the-wall paradigm is thus both defeated and rendered obsolete.

== Production ==
Rapisarda Casanova's stylistic hallmarks include his elliptical, metacinematic approach to storytelling, his use of non-actors, diegetic off-screen sound, meticulously composed static single-takes, low camera angles and careful elaboration of natural light and colour. His approach to filmmaking is mostly process-driven, after careful research of the thematic base. The intent behind such stylistic and methodological choices is to create cinematic occasions where people and places may reveal their deepest nature.

== Release and critical response ==
In 2011, The Strawberry Tree was screened at the Locarno Film Festival and the International Documentary Film Festival Amsterdam. In 2012 it screened at the Los Angeles Film Festival and the Miami Film Festival, and it received the Most Promising Filmmaker Award at the Ann Arbor Film Festival. The film ranked 33rd in Film Comment's list of the "50 Best Undistributed Films of 2012".

=== Awards ===
- Most Promising Filmmaker award, Ann Arbor Film Festival, MI, USA
- NFB Award for Most Innovative Canadian Documentary, DOXA Documentary Film Festival, Vancouver, Canada
- Best Documentary award, Cine Las Americas International Film Festival, Austin, TX, USA
- Grand Jury Honorable Mention, Miami International Film Festival, FL, USA

=== Collections ===
- Bibliothèque nationale de France
- Library and Archives Canada
