= Milagros Mumenthaler =

Argentine-Swiss Film director and screenwriter

Milagros Mumenthaler (born 1977 in La Falda, Argentina) is a film director, and screenplay writer. Born in Argentina and raised in Switzerland, Mumenthaler filmography includes two feature-length films and several short films. Back to Stay her first feature-length film was a major critical success and collected many awards in film festivals all around the world.

== Filmography ==
Year	Title	Original title	Notes
2000	¿Cuándo llega papá?		Short Film
2003	Cape Cod		Short Film
2004	The Patio	El Patio	Short Film
2006	Amancay		Short Film
2011	Back to Stay	Abrir puertas y ventanas	Feature-length debut
2012	Menuet		Short Film
2016	The Idea of a Lake	La idea de un lago	
2025	The Currents	Las corrientes	

== Awards and nominations ==
Year	Award	Category	Title	Result
2004	Buenos Aires International Festival of Independent Cinema	Best Short Film	The Patio	Won
2011	Locarno Film Festival	Golden Leopard	Back to Stay	Won
2011	Locarno Film Festival	FIPRESCI Prize	Back to Stay	Won
2011	San Sebastián International Film Festival	Horizons Award	Back to Stay	Nominated
2011	Mar del Plata International Film Festival	Golden Astor	Back to Stay	Won
2011	Mar del Plata International Film Festival	Best Director	Back to Stay	Won
2011	Munich International Film festival	Best Film By An Emerging Director	Back to Stay	Won
2016	Locarno Film Festival	Golden Leopard	The Idea of a Lake	Nominated
