= Back to Stay =

2011 film

- Theatrical release poster
- Directed by: Milagros Mumenthaler
- Written by: Milagros Mumenthaler
- Produced by: David Epiney; Eugenia Mumenthaler; Violeta Bava; Rosa Martinez Rivero
- Starring: María Canale; Martina Juncadella; Ailín Salas; Julián Tello
- Cinematography: Martín Frías
- Edited by: Gion-Reto Killias
- Release date: August 2011
- Running time: 99 minutes
- Countries: Argentina; Switzerland
- Language: Spanish

Back to Stay (Spanish: Abrir puertas y ventanas) is a 2011 Argentine-Swiss film written and directed by Milagros Mumenthaler. At the 2011 Locarno Film Festival, it won multiple awards, including the Golden Leopard, the Best Actress Award for María Canale, and the FIPRESCI Prize. It later won the Golden Astor at the Mar del Plata International Film Festival and the CineVision Award at Filmfest München.

== Synopsis ==
After the death of the grandmother who raised them, three sisters are left on their own in their parents’ house in Buenos Aires. Each responds differently to the loss: Marina focuses on her studies and the running of the household, Sofia becomes absorbed in her appearance and possessions, and Violeta spends much of her time apart from the others while occasionally receiving an older man. As the sisters try to adjust to life on their own, Violeta suddenly disappears.

== Cast ==
The cast includes:

- María Canale as Marina
- Martina Juncadella as Sofia
- Ailín Salas as Violeta
- Julián Tello as Francisco
- Andrés Granier as Pedro

== Reception ==
Filmdienst described the film as a sensitive debut feature about three young women coming to terms with life on their own while remaining deeply attached to one another. It also noted that the film draws on Anton Chekhov’s Three Sisters. Variety described it as “a self-conscious, ultimately slight debut”, while praising its visual style and Martin Frías’s cinematography.

== Awards ==
Award	Date of ceremony	Category	Recipients and nominees	Result
Locarno Film Festival	13 August 2011	Golden Leopard	Back to Stay	Won
Locarno Film Festival	13 August 2011	Best Actress Award	María Canale	Won
Locarno Film Festival	13 August 2011	FIPRESCI Prize	Back to Stay	Won
Mar del Plata International Film Festival	13 November 2011	Golden Astor	Back to Stay	Won
Mar del Plata International Film Festival	13 November 2011	Best Director	Milagros Mumenthaler	Won
Filmfest München	7 July 2012	CineVision Award	Milagros Mumenthaler	Won

== Festival screenings ==
The film premiered at the Locarno Film Festival in August 2011. Later that year, it was also screened at festivals including the Toronto International Film Festival, the San Sebastián International Film Festival, the BFI London Film Festival, and the Vancouver International Film Festival. In 2012, it was also shown at festivals including the International Film Festival Rotterdam, the Hong Kong International Film Festival, the San Francisco International Film Festival, the Jeonju International Film Festival, and Filmfest München.
