= Sunny Days (film) =

2011 film

- Directed by: Nariman Turebayev
- Written by: Nariman Turebayev
- Starring: Inkar Abdrash
- Cinematography: Boris Troshev
- Release date: 11 August 2011 (Locarno)
- Running time: 101 minutes
- Country: Kazakhstan
- Language: Russian

Sunny Days (Russian: Solnetchniye dni) is a 2011 Kazakhstani drama film directed by Nariman Turebayev.

== Cast ==
- Inkar Abdrash
- Asel Kaliyeva
- Yuri Radin
- Erlan Utepbergenov
