= Marco Anghileri =

Italian footballer

Personal information
- Date of birth: 11 April 1991 (age 35)
- Place of birth: Valmadrera, Italy
- Height: 1.75 m (5 ft 9 in)
- Position: Right back

Youth career
- Monza

Senior career*
Years	Team	Apps	(Gls)
2009–2015	Monza	118	(3)
2015	AlbinoLeffe	15	(0)
2015–2025	Renate	307	(10)
- * Club domestic league appearances and goals as of 25 April 2025

Marco Anghileri (born 11 April 1991) is an Italian professional footballer who plays as a right back.

== Club career ==
Born in Valmadrera, Anghileri made his professional debut for Monza in 2009–10 Lega Pro season. He spent six seasons at the club, and in March 2014 played his 100th match for Monza.

In 2015, after a Monza club economic crisis, Anghileri signed with AlbinoLeffe.

In July 2015, Anghileri joined Serie C club Renate, where was named captain of the team. On 15 May 2021, he extended his contract with the club until 2023. In December 2022, he signed another new deal with Renate, committing to stay until June 2024.

== Personal life ==
In June 2021, he married Barbara Colombo.
