= Salvador Roselli =

Salvador Roselli is a film director and screenplay writer.

He works in the cinema of Argentina.

Roselli is a graduate of Argentina's primary film school, the Universidad del Cine.

== Filmography ==
Director and writer

- Mala época (1998)

Screenplay

- El Perro (2004) a.k.a. Bombón: El Perro
- Sofacama (2006) a.k.a. Sofabed
- Liverpool (2008) a.k.a. Liverpool
- Las Acacias (2011)
- El muerto y ser felíz (2012) a.k.a. The Dead Man and Being Happy
