= Mariana Anghileri =

Argentine television and film actress

Moro Anghileri
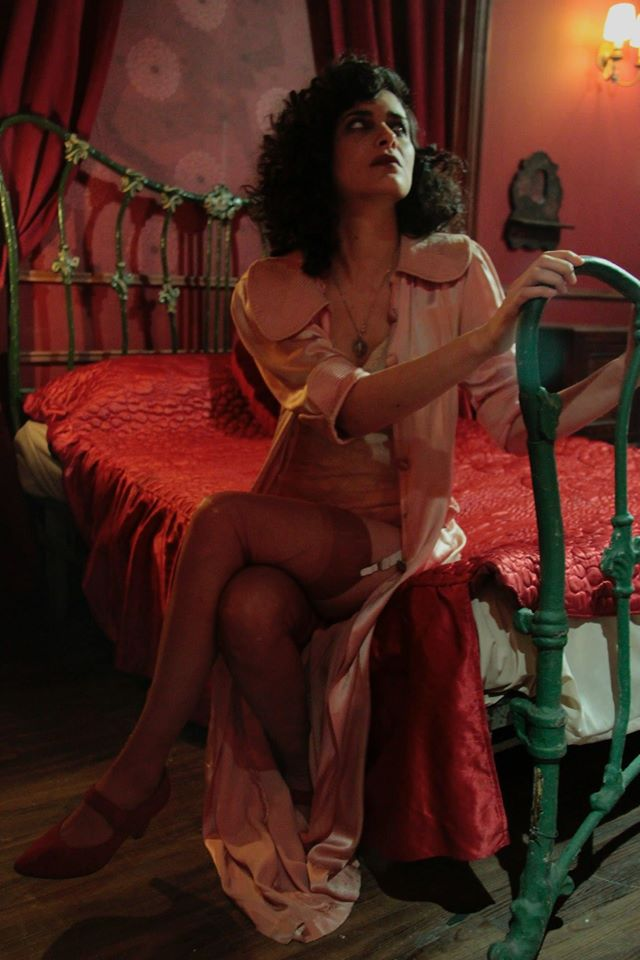
- Born: Mariana Anghileri; April 14, 1977 (age 48); Junín, Buenos Aires, Argentina
- Occupations: Actress, Theatre director
- Years active: 1997–present
- Awards: Revelación femenina (2005) Good Life Delivery
- Website: MoroAnghileri.com

Mariana "Moro" Anghileri (born April 14, 1977) is an Argentine television and film actress.

Born in Junín, Buenos Aires, she first starred in the slice-of-life film, Sábado (2001), and has since worked in numerous roles for television and the cinema of Argentina. She earned a Silver Condor Award for her starring role in the tragic Buena Vida Delivery (2004).

== Filmography ==
- Sábado (2001) a.k.a. Saturday
- Nadar solo (2003)
- Vida en Marte (2003)
- Si no me ahogo (2004)
- Good Life Delivery (2004)
- Lifting de corazón (2005)
- Side Walls (2005)
- Ronda nocturna (2005) a.k.a. Night Watch
- A los ojos de Dios (2005)
- Aballay (2010)
- The Corporation (2012)
- El muerto cuenta su historia (2016)
- Mi mejor amigo (2018)

== Television ==
- Sangre fría (2004) (mini TV Series)
- Sin crédito (2005) (mini TV Series)
- Flor do Caribe (2013) (Brazilian soap opera)
- El encargado (2022)

== Awards ==
Wins

- Argentine Film Critics Association Awards: Silver Condor; Best New Actress, for: Buena Vida Delivery; 2005.
