= I Like to Work (Mobbing) =

2004 Italian drama film by Francesca Comencini

- Directed by: Francesca Comencini
- Cinematography: Luca Bigazzi
- Music by: Gianni Coscia; Gianluigi Trovesi
- Release date: 2004
- Language: Italian

I Like to Work (Mobbing) (Italian: Mi piace lavorare (Mobbing)) is a 2004 Italian drama film directed by Francesca Comencini. It won the Panorama section Ecumenical Jury Prize at the 54th Berlin International Film Festival. It also won the Nastro d'Argento for best script.

== Cast ==
- Nicoletta Braschi: Anna
- Camille Dugay Comencini: Morgana
- Marina Buoncristiani: Marina
- Roberta Celea: Roberta
- Assunta Cestaro: Sindacalista

== See also ==
- List of Italian films of 2004
