= Ignacio Toselli =

Argentine actor

Ignacio Toselli is an Argentine film actor who works in the cinema of Argentina.

== Filmography ==
- Buena Vida Delivery (2004) aka Good Life Delivery
- Cruzaron el disco (2005)
- Bonsai (2005)
- Teléfonos (2005)
- Ropa sucia (2006)
- Gotas de agua (2006)
- Una Tango (2007)
- Yo soy Sola (2008)
- Las Huellas de la Lluvia (2008)
- Liniers, la película (2010)
- El Notificador (2011)
- "Días de Vinilo" (2012)

== Television ==
- La Niñera (2004) as Bigarella (Episode: "Un cacho de cultura")

== Awards ==
- Festival International La Roche-sur-Yon: Best actor, for: Buena Vida Delivery; 2004.

Nominations

- Argentine Film Critics Association Awards: Silver Condor; Best New Actor, for: Buena Vida Delivery; 2005.
- Premio Estrella de Mar Best New Actor, for: "Soñar en Boedo"; 2010.
