= Los golpes bajos =

- Directed by: Mario Sábato
- Written by: Mario Sábato, Mario Mactas
- Starring: Aldo Barbero; Héctor Alterio; Walter Vidarte; Ana María Picchio
- Cinematography: Julio Duplaquet
- Edited by: Antonio Ripoll
- Music by: Eduardo Falú
- Release date: 4 February 1974
- Running time: 95 minutes
- Country: Argentina
- Language: Spanish

Los golpes bajos (The Low Blows) is a 1974 Argentine film directed by Mario Sábato. It is a film about boxing, inspired by José María Gatica. Shot in Eastmancolor, Sabato wrote the script in collaboration with Mario Mactas. The film stars Aldo Barbero, Héctor Alterio, Walter Vidarte and Ana María Picchio.

The film premiered on 4 February 1974 in Buenos Aires. It is also known under the title De cara al asfalto.

== Plot ==
Set in the early Peron era, this rise and fall of a boxer is visibly inspired by the biography of José María Gatica and his experiences.

== Cast ==
- Aldo Barbero
- Héctor Alterio
- Walter Vidarte
- Ana María Picchio
- Adrián Ghío
- Hugo Arana
- Onofre Lovero
- Luis Politti
- Susana Lanteri
- Rodolfo Brindisi

== Reception ==
Rómulo Berruti in Clarín stated that it was a film intended to be a review of the Peronist regime, using the drama of a boxer as a "pivot". El Mundo opined that it is a " film that loses by points… It feeds but it doesn't hit. It avoids but does not delve… more nostalgic than critical… immature, but with good intentions". Manrupe and Portela wrote: "Good reconstruction at times and some drama achieved". Luis Trelles Plazaola in his book South American Cinema/ Cine De America Del Sur: Dictionary of Film Makers describes Los golpes bajos as a "film of greater weight and thematic ambition".
