= Eugenio Zanetti =

Argentine dramatist, painter and art director (1946–2026)

- Born: October 19, 1946; Córdoba, Argentina
- Died: September 18, 2026 (aged 79); Buenos Aires, Argentina
- Occupations: Dramatist; painter; art director; opera director; set and production designer
- Years active: 1974–2026

Eugenio Zanetti (October 19, 1946 – September 18, 2026) was an Argentine dramatist, painter, film set designer, and theater and opera director. He won an Academy Award for Best Art Direction in 1995, for the film Restoration.

== Life and career ==
Zanetti was born in Córdoba on October 19, 1946. After travelling to Europe in the mid 1960's and meeting Pier Paolo Pasolini, he participated in the latter's film version of Medea. After his father died, he returned to his country to help his family. He became involved in the cinema of Argentina, and provided set designs for Mario Sábato's The Power of Darkness (1979), for which he won a Moscow Film Festival Award for Design, and Alejandro Doria's Los Pasajeros del jardín (1982).

During the Malvinas/Falklands War he relocated to Los Angeles, and began a career in Hollywood working as the production designer for Wayne Wang in Slam Dance (1987). Zanetti created set designs for Some Girls (1988), for which he won a Toronto Festival of Festivals Design Award, Flatliners (1990), Last Action Hero (1993), Soapdish (1991), and Restoration (1995), for which he earned an Academy Award for Best Art Direction. He also designed set for What Dreams May Come (1998), The Haunting (1999), Alfonso Arau's Zapata: El sueño de un héroe (2004), and Roland Joffé's There Be Dragons (2011), among others. He returned to Argentine film in 2008, when he joined the production of Jorge Rodríguez's Árbol de fuego. Ultimately, Árbol de fuego was not made into a film.

His more than 40 theater and opera productions in Europe and South America include: A Masked Ball and Nabucco by Giuseppe Verdi, and Madama Butterfly and Tosca by Giacomo Puccini. He also had a successful career as Director of Musicals, receiving the Thalia Award (equivalent to the Tony Award) in Argentina for his local productions of They're Playing Our Song, Chicago and Dracula as a director, and the same award for his adaptation of Philippa Gregory's The White Queen. He also earned a Star of the Sea Award for The Cherry Orchard, Chapter Two, Company, and Peer Gynt.

In 2014 he released his first film as writer and director, Amapola, a fantasy drama film starring Camilla Belle, François Arnaud, Geraldine Chaplin, Leonor Benedetto, Lito Cruz and Elena Roger.

Zanetti died on September 18, 2026, at the age of 79.

== Production designer credits ==
- Amapola (2014) (Also credited as writer and director)
- The Haunting (1999)
- What Dreams May Come (1998)
- Restoration (1995)
- Tall Tale (1995)
- Last Action Hero (1993)
- Soapdish (1991)
- Flatliners (1990)
- Promised Land (1987)
- Slam Dance (1987)
- The Power of Darkness (1979)
- The Truce (1974)

== Influences ==
Zanetti was interviewed by novelist, travel writer and critic, Jason Webster for The Idries Shah Foundation in London, on 29 August 2017. In the filmed interview, Zanetti was asked about the impact that the Sufi mystical tradition and the writer, thinker and Sufi teacher, Idries Shah, whose work he discovered in the 1960s, had on his life. Zanetti said that for the past fifty years, since the age of nineteen, he had been interested and influenced by Sufism; that the impact of "the Tradition" on him had been immense, and that Idries Shah had put in context an "enormous amount of knowledge", of "incredible depth". He added that the full, cultural impact of the Shah family's work in the tradition, including that of Zanetti's friend, film writer Arif Ali-Shah, would only become recognized and known with the passage of time, in years to come.
