= The Power of Darkness (1979 film) =

El poder de las tinieblas
- Theatrical release poster
- Directed by: Mario Sábato
- Screenplay by: Mario Sábato
- Based on: On Heroes and Tombs by Ernesto Sábato
- Produced by: Pedro Pereyra
- Starring: Sergio Renán; Osvaldo Terranova; Christina Banegas; Leonor Benedetto; Aldo Barbero; Rodolfo Brindisi
- Cinematography: Leonardo Rodríguez Solí
- Edited by: Remo Charbonello
- Music by: Víctor Proncet
- Production company: Productores Americanos S.A.
- Release date: 14 June 1979
- Running time: 90 minutes
- Country: Argentina
- Language: Spanish

The Power of Darkness (Spanish: El poder de las tinieblas) is a 1979 Argentine mystery-horror thriller film written and directed by Mario Sábato and starring Sergio Renán. It is based on the chapter named Informe sobre ciegos ("Report on the Blind"), from the novel On Heroes and Tombs, written by the father of the director, Ernesto Sábato. It was nominated for Best Film at the International Fantasy Film Award Fantasporto in 1982.

The film can be read as a clear metaphor for the State terrorism and violence produced by the military dictatorship that ruled Argentina at the time, the self-titled "National Reorganization Process" (1976–1983).

== Synopsis ==
A man (Renán) has discovered a global conspiracy made by blind people, but can not prove or convince others. So he decides to write a report for the record, in case something happens. The film takes place in dark places, during the night, such as subways and basements.

== Cast ==
- Sergio Renán
- Osvaldo Terranova
- Carlos Antón
- Christina Banegas
- Aldo Barbero
- Leonor Benedetto
- Rodolfo Brindisi
- Franklin Caicedo
- Jorge De La Riestra
- Graciela Dufau
- Enrique Fava
- Valentina Fernández De Rosa
- Augusto Larreta
- Carlos Moreno
- Nelly Prono
