= To the Heart =

- Directed by: Mario Sábato
- Written by: Mario Sábato
- Produced by: Alberto González
- Starring: Libertad Lamarque; Alberto Castillo; Hugo del Carril
- Cinematography: Sergio Dotta
- Edited by: Norberto Rapado
- Music by: Sexteto Mayor
- Distributed by: Argentina Video Home
- Release date: 6 June 1996
- Running time: 92 minutes
- Country: Argentina
- Language: Spanish

To the Heart (Spanish title: Al Corazón) is a 1996 Argentine documentary musical film directed and written by Mario Sábato. The film starred Libertad Lamarque and Alberto Castillo. The film explores the history of tango dancing in Argentina, and was filmed in Buenos Aires, Argentina.

== Cast ==
- Olinda Bozán
- Enrique Cadícamo - Narrator
- Alberto Castillo
- Hugo del Carril
- Libertad Lamarque
- Tita Merello
- Florencio Parravicini
- Sergio Renán - Narrator
- Ernesto Sábato - Narrator
- Luis Sandrini
- Adriana Varela - Narrator

== Release and acclaim ==
The film was produced both in black and white and in colour. It premiered on 22 March 1996. In 1997, Al Corazón's film editor Norberto Rapado won a Silver Condor award for Best Film Editing at the Argentine Film Critics Association Awards.

Narrators of the film Enrique Cadícamo and Adriana Varela
