= Y que patatín...y que patatán =

1971 film

- Directed by: Mario Sábato
- Written by: Mario Sábato, Mario Mactas
- Cinematography: Julio Duplaquet
- Edited by: Enrique Muzio, Teresa Funari, Silvia Barrilli
- Music by: Tata Cedrón
- Distributed by: Producciones Leopoldo Torre Nilsson
- Release date: 30 September 1971
- Running time: 80 minutes
- Country: Argentina
- Language: Spanish

Y que patatín...y que patatán is a 1971 Argentine comedy film directed and written by Mario Sábato in collaboration with Mario Mactas. The film stars Juan Sabato, Sergio Renán, Julia von Grolman and Fernando Siro.

The film premiered on 30 September 1971 in Buenos Aires. It was exhibited at the Venice International Film Festival in 1971.

== Plot ==
Five episodes depict children in extreme situations, taking a raw look at their childhood.

== Cast ==
- Juan Sabato
- Sergio Renán
- Julia von Grolman
- Fernando Siro
- Héctor Alterio
- Cipe Lincovsky
- Walter Vidarte
- Walter Santa Ana
- Elena Cruz
- Héctor Calcaño

== Reception ==
Agustín Mahieu said in La Opinión: A recommended film showing children as an oppressed class. The set is an uneven work ... but fascinating, undoubtedly original. The irony, roughness and sensitivity that Sabato reflects in his vision of childhood is probably his greatest merit". Panorama noted its "mesh of close-ups and detail shots that frequently isolate the protagonist", capturing an "abstract childhood, burdened by the camera and the circumstances of the story". Manrupe and Portela wrote: "Irregular in the formal, valuable in its approach to the children's world and its problems".
