= Nicolás Furtado =

Uruguayan actor (born 1988)

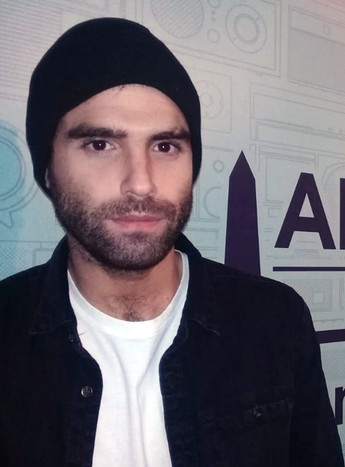
- Furtado in 2019
- Born: Nicolás Furtado Alonzo; 6 February 1988 (age 38); Montevideo, Uruguay
- Occupation: Actor
- Years active: 2008–present

Nicolás Furtado Alonzo (born 6 February 1988) is a Uruguayan actor. He is best known for his leading role in the crime drama El Marginal (2016–2022), as well as for his appearances in other series such as Porque te quiero así (2012), Somos familia (2014), Educando a Nina (2016) and Bandidos (2024–present).

== Life ==
Furtado was born on 6 February 1988 La Teja, Montevideo. He took architecture courses before attending Ricardo Berio's Escuela del Actor from 2006 to 2008. Furtado started his acting career in Montevideo. In 2012, he moved to Argentina to act in the telenovela, Digo. Furtado won a Tato Award due to his versatility.

== Filmography ==
=== Television ===
- Porque te quiero así (2011)
- Dulce amor (2012)
- Terra ribelle 2 (2012)
- Somos familia (2014)
- El marginal (2016–2022)
- Educando a Nina (2016)
- Amongst Men (2021)
- Olympo (2025)

=== Film ===
- Porn for Newbies (2018) directed by Carlos Ameglio
- El paraíso (2022) directed by Fernando Sirianni and Federico Breser
- Me he hecho viral (2023)
- Goyo (2024)

== Awards ==
- 2016: Tato Award for Best Supporting Actor
