= Amapola =

Amapola is Spanish for "poppy", meaning the genus Papaver

Amapola may also refer to:

- "Amapola" (song), a 1920 song written by Joseph Lacalle
- Amapola (film), a 2014 Argentine-American romantic comedy fantasy film
- Amapola Flyg, a regional airline based in Stockholm, Sweden
- Maria Amapola Cabase (born 1948), Filipino singer and actress, stage name Amapola
- La Amapola (born 1976), ring name of Guadalupe Ramona Olvera, Mexican professional wrestler
