= Youth in Uganda =

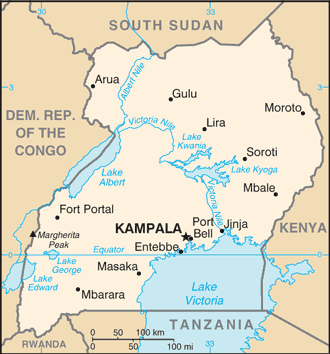
A map of Uganda.

Youth in Uganda are the youngest population in the world, with 77% of its population being under 25 years of age. There are 7,310,386 youth from the ages of 15–24 years of age living in Uganda.

== Definition of youth ==
Youth is a socially constructed intermediary phase that stands between childhood and adulthood. UNICEF generally defines youth as being between the ages of 15 and 24 years old. The youth policy defines youth as all young persons, female and male, aged 12 to 30 years.

== Demographics ==
In Uganda the male to female ratio is 100.2 males per 100 females. Life expectancy at birth for males is 42.59 years and 44.49 years for females. Ugandan youth experience different lifestyles depending on if they live in a rural or urban area. Many youth decide to migrate from the rural areas to the urban areas based on factors that include kinship ties and friendship ties, rural incomes, role of rural education, and the rural social system.

== Education ==
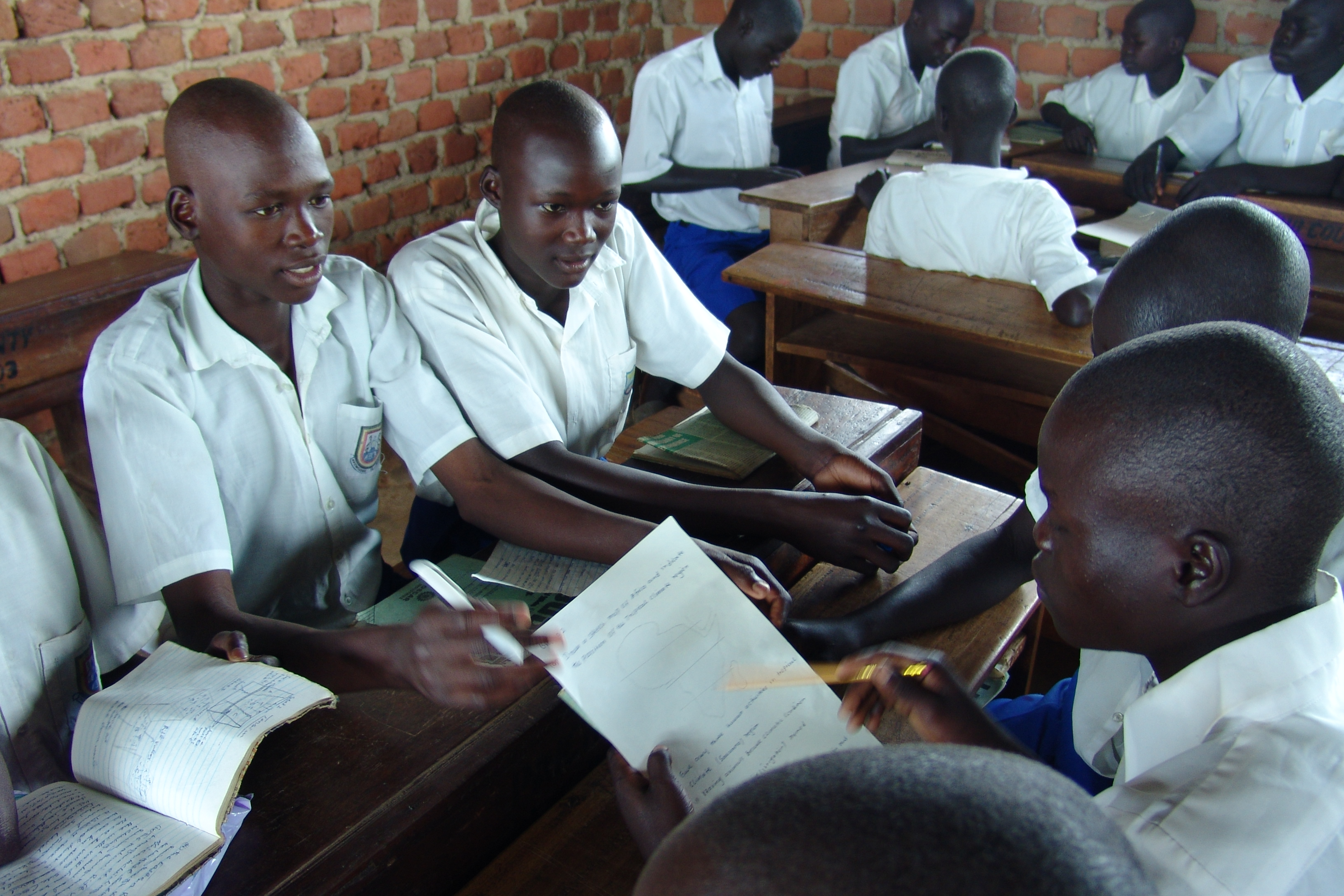
Students at the Unyama Primary School in the Unyama IDP Camp.

Uganda established Makerere University, its first public university in 1922 and a second public university in 1989. In the early 1990s, Uganda introduced private sponsorship into the public universities. By 2005, there were 27 universities in Uganda and of which 80% were private institutions. The youth literacy rates between 2005 and 2010 were 90% for males and 85% for females.

Only students who have successfully completed A-levels and passed their Uganda Advanced Certification of Education are eligible to enter post-secondary institutions. There are three types of publicly supported institutions in Uganda. They consist of autonomous institutions, institutions run by the Ministry of Education, and institutes administered by the Public Service Commission.

As of 1998, Uganda’s enrollment in universities and institutions of higher education was up to 34,773 students. This is double the rate in 1991 when Uganda only had 17,585 students enrolled. The rate of females in 1998 enrolled was 33 percent of the student population which was an increase from 28% in 1991.

Students who are nationals and are on government aide pay nothing for their tuition, pocket money expenses, transportation costs and boarding costs. The Ministry of Education covers all these students in their large annual budget that they receive from the Ministry of Finance. They estimate that they pay around 6,000,000 Ugandan shillings or 3,000 U.S dollars per student that they assist.

According to the Young people fact sheet by UNFPA (2014), 78% of young people aged 13–18 years are currently attending school. 10% of those between 10% 6–12 years have never been to school. 22% of adolescents aged 13–18 have dropped out of school. Further still, 8.8 million young people aged 15–24 are not engaged in education, employment or under any training

== Employment ==
The unemployment rate for young people in Uganda ages 15–24 is 83%. This rate is even higher for those who have formal degrees and live in the urban area. This is due to the disconnect between the degree achieved and the vocational skills needed for the jobs that are in demand for workers.

Those without a degree are also not able to obtain jobs because they lack the skills needed for the position or they don’t have the resources such as land or capital. Some youth also have negative views on certain jobs so they are unwilling to take them if offered a position. Youth unemployment poses a serious political, economic, and social challenge to the country and its leadership. The cycle is making it increasingly difficult for Uganda to break out of poverty. Young women also more often have to stay at home in a maternal role from a very young age which limits their ability to work.

Informal sector work accounts for the majority of young workers in Uganda. 3.2% of youth work for waged employment, 90.9% work for informal employment, and 5.8% of the Ugandan youth are self-employed.

According to Amamukirori B. & Mubiru A. (2018), in the population report, they indicate that there are wage differentials by gender in favor of the male among the employed youth. The youth in public sector earn more than those in private sector while those in Northern and Eastern region are the least paid. Further more, they highlight the agricultural sector as one that employs the highest number of youth, followed by trade, manufacturing and then the transport sector. The youth unemployment rate which now stands at 6.5%, is attributed it to mismatch between skills obtained through the education system and labour market demands.

== Health ==
Age at sexual debut within this community in 2000 was reported at 16.7 years for young women and 18.2 years for young men, while the median age at marriage was 19.5 years for young women and 24 years for men. Information on sexual and reproductive health for young people comes from a variety of sources including parents, paternal aunts (ssenga), uncles (kojja), older brothers and sisters, peers, radio and newspapers.

When asked if they had knowledge about HIV, 38% of males ages 15–19 said yes and 31% of females in the same age range said yes. Youth that were questioned about at what age people should become sexually active, all participants across all data collection methods stated that the ideal age is between 18 and 20 years. The participants also said that people actually started to have sex anywhere from 4 to 16 years, but all young people believed this was too early.

Condom use is much higher amongst in-school youth rather than out-of-school youth. In-school youth also found that they had fewer sexual partners overall than the out-of-school youth and they are also more likely to be involved in family planning than the out-of-school youth.
