= La Fiesta de todos =

- Directed by: Sergio Renán
- Written by: Hugo Sofovich, Adrián Quiroga and Gogo Andreu
- Release date: 1979
- Running time: 110 minute
- Country: Argentina
- Language: Spanish

La Fiesta de todos (The Party of All) is a 1979 Argentinian film produced by the Ente Autárquico Mundial 1978 (EAM´78), organization in charge of the organization of the 1978 FIFA World Cup where with a cast of Argentinian actors such as Luis Sandrini, shows the feeling of the Argentinian people towards the event. Produced during the dictatorship of the National Reorganization Process, it has been compared to Nazi Germany's 1938 Olympia.

== Plot ==
The propaganda film is a alternatingly documentary reconstruction of Argentina's victory in the 1978 FIFA World Cup, interspersed with different fictional comedic sketches that occur during the same period. Sketches include fictional scenes in the broadcast booth and Argentinians at home watching the game.

== Cast ==
- Juan Carlos Calabró
- Mario Sánchez
- Ricardo Espalter
- Luis Landriscina
- Julio de Grazia
- Nélida Lobato
- Félix Luna
- Marta Lynch
- Roberto Maidana
- César Luis Menotti
- José María Muñoz
- Luis Sandrini
- Malvina Pastorino
- Gogó Andreu
- Aldo Barbero
- Elsa Berenguer
- Amalia Bernabé
- Rudy Chernicoff
- Alfonso De Grazia
- Graciela Dufau
- Ulises Dumont
- Alberto Irízar
- Susú Pecoraro
- Elena Sedova
- Silvina Rada
- Néstor Ibarra
- Enrique Macaya Márquez
- Ricardo Darín
- Roberto Ayala
- Héctor Drazer
- Diego Bonadeo
- Gustavo Carfagna
- Miguel Jordán
- Jorge de la Riestra
- Margarita Luro
- Jesús Pamplonas
- Atilio Regaló
- Tacholas
- Tempo
- Jorge Villalba
- Memé Vigo
- Marcos Woinski

== See also ==
- List of association football films
