= The Passion of Martin =

- Directed by: Alexander Payne
- Screenplay by: Alexander Payne
- Based on: El túnel by Ernesto Sabato
- Produced by: Evelyn Nussenbaum; Alexander Payne
- Starring: Charley Hayward
- Cinematography: David Rudd
- Edited by: Alexander Payne
- Music by: John O'Kennedy
- Release date: 1990
- Running time: 49 minutes
- Country: United States
- Language: English
- Budget: $26,000

The Passion of Martin is a 1990 American comedy film written and directed by Alexander Payne, adapted from the novel El túnel by Ernesto Sabato.

== Plot ==
Lonely photographer Martin feels nothing but solitude in his existence, work, and even relationships with others. He is repeatedly reminded that everything boils down to nothing more than base animal nature.

One evening at an exhibition he notices a woman observing his work in a gallery, studying a photograph he holds as particularly important and meaningful. For that brief instant his life and all of his work seems to have some sort of meaning.

He later sees the same woman, Rebecca, attending a wedding that he has been hired to photograph, and he approaches her during the reception. They discuss a variety of topics openly and he admires her strong mind and personality. They spend the night together and he believes that he has found his soulmate but in the morning he finds that she has disappeared and left a simple note with her phone number.

He calls her but does not receive the enthusiastic response he desires, turning his initially positive feelings toward her into an obsession. He locates her address in the phone book and sneaks into her apartment building. There he spots her returning to her apartment with a man and he waits outside her apartment all night as his positive feelings toward her mix with disgust.

The next day she visits him at his apartment and cooks dinner, during which he confronts her about the other man, Peter. Their differing perceptions and ideals of human nature and relationships lead to a heated argument. He holds her down and forces her to say that she loves him, then she immediately runs out of the apartment when she has a chance.

The next day he visits Rebecca's apartment and gets Peter's address from her roommate, who says that the two are out for lunch together. He drives toward Peter's house, planning to confront them when they return from lunch, but his car runs out of gas on the drive. In an effort to stop them on the road, he pushes a large boulder off the cliff onto the road, inadvertently hitting the car in which she is riding.

In the final scene Rebecca is shown in an immobile state connected to life support equipment as Martin happily states that they have been together for a year now.

== Cast ==
- Charley Hayward as Martin
- Lisa Zane as Rebecca
- Joe Marinelli as Father
- Holgie Forrester as Neighbor
- Lauren Tuerk as Roommate

== Production ==
The Passion of Martin was Payne's thesis film for his MFA from UCLA Film School. He completed the film in 1990, the year in which he graduated.

The film is adapted from the novel El túnel by Ernesto Sabato. In the novel the main character notices a woman studying a detail in a painting in a gallery, whereas in the film Martin notices a woman studying his photographs in a gallery.

== Reception ==
The film was shown to acclaim at the Cannes Film Festival in 1991 and attracted industry attention, getting Payne a writing/directing deal with Universal Pictures worth $125,000. The ensuing screenplay, which was turned down, would ultimately become the 2002 Academy Award-nominated About Schmidt.
