= Intuition (film) =

2020 film

- Film poster
- Spanish: La corazonada
- Directed by: Alejandro Montiel
- Written by: Alejandro Montiel
- Based on: La Vírgen en tus Ojos by Florencia Etcheves
- Starring: Luisana Lopilato; Joaquín Furriel; Rafael Ferro
- Production company: FAM Contenidos
- Distributed by: Netflix
- Release date: May 28, 2020
- Running time: 116 minutes
- Country: Argentina
- Language: Spanish

Intuition (Spanish: La corazonada) is a 2020 Argentine crime-thriller film written and directed by Alejandro Montiel and starring Luisana Lopilato and Joaquín Furriel. Based on the novel La Vírgen en tus Ojos (Spanish: The Virgin in your Eyes) by Florencia Etcheves, the film serves as a prequel to the 2018 film Perdida. It is Netflix's first Argentine original movie.

== Cast ==
- Luisana Lopilato as Manuela Pelari
- Joaquín Furriel as Francisco Juanéz
- Rafael Ferro as Fiscal Emilio Roger
- Delfina Chaves as Gloriana Márquez
- Maite Lanata as Minerva del Valle
- Juan Manuel Guilera as Fito Lagos
- Marita Ballesteros as Inés Quesada
- Sebastián Mogordoy as Suboficial Ordoñez
- Abel Ayala as El Zorro

== Release ==
It was released on May 28, 2020.
