= Brief Heaven =

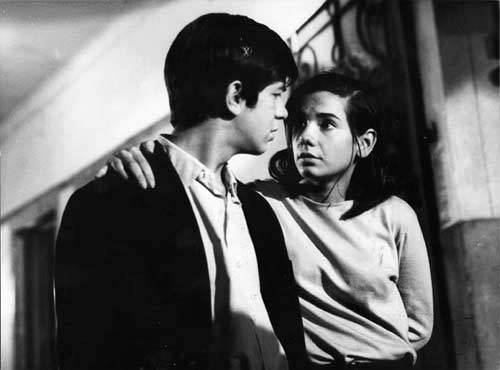
- Directed by: David José Kohon
- Written by: David José Kohon
- Starring: Ana Maria Picchio
- Edited by: Armando Blanco; Gerardo Rinaldi
- Music by: Astor Piazzolla
- Release date: 5 June 1969
- Running time: 84 minutes
- Country: Argentina
- Language: Spanish

Brief Heaven (Spanish: Breve cielo) is a 1969 Argentine film directed by David José Kohon. It was entered into the 6th Moscow International Film Festival where Ana María Picchio won the award for Best Actress.

In a survey of the 100 greatest films of Argentine cinema carried out by the Museo del Cine Pablo Ducrós Hicken in 2000, the film reached the 24th position. In a new version of the survey organized in 2022 by the specialized magazines La vida útil, Taipei and La tierra quema, presented at the Mar del Plata International Film Festival, the film reached the 41st position.

== Plot ==
A young middle-class man and a young girl who has left the slums to work as a prostitute meet by chance on the Plaza de los Ingleses, opposite the emblematic Retiro station in Buenos Aires. Their encounter lasts no more than a day and morning, an enchanted lapse of time that echoes the title Brief Heaven. Kohon’s beautiful but sad film draws the picture of the nascent change in a generation’s mentality (unabashedly conveyed by the only elliptic erotic scene), while also asserting a new way of filming. The streets and promenades of Buenos Aires offer a welcome to the characters but also play a clearly aesthetic role, as for example, in the remarkable tracking shot that moves through the underground gallery near the Obelisk to the echoing notes of Piazzolla’s bandoneon. Roger Koza

== Cast ==
- Ana María Picchio
- Alberto Fernández de Rosa
- Gloria Raines
- Zelmar Gueñol
- Beto Gianola
- David Llewelyn
- Marta Moreno
- Cristina Banegas
- Remedios Climent
- Carlos Antón
- Felipe Méndez
