= Abaddón el exterminador =

First edition (publ. Sudamericana)

Abaddón, el exterminador is the last novel by Argentine author Ernesto Sabato. It was first published in 1974, and forms the culmination of his work, the third in the loosely related trilogy begun with The Tunnel and followed with On Heroes and Tombs.

== Structure, themes, and plot ==
Abaddon, arguably Sabato's most experimental work, presents a fragmented narrative structure. It mixes autobiographical events – which combine actual events with fantastic elements – with parallel stories, philosophical analysis, hypotheses and literary criticism, retold by characters who, in the same role, were often present in the previous novel. Abaddon is arguably apocalyptic in tone, recreating adverse historical events that took place in Argentina in the 1970s, as well as mentioning twentieth century events, such as the Second World War, the bombing of Hiroshima and the Vietnam War.

Through the novel, Sabato presents a denunciation of evil. It is an unfinished work, it being fragmented. The novel centers on a man who looks at the world and at himself. The author is himself named as a character, and referred to by other characters.
