= Goyo (2024 film) =

- Promotional release poster
- Directed by: Marcos Carnevale
- Written by: Marcos Carnevale
- Produced by: Martín Kweller; Rocío Gort; Ignacio Rey
- Starring: Nicolás Furtado; Nancy Dupláa; Soledad Villamil
- Cinematography: Horacio Maira
- Edited by: Alberto Ponce
- Music by: Iván Wyszogrod
- Production companies: Kuarzo Entertainment Argentina; Leyenda
- Distributed by: Netflix
- Release date: 5 July 2024 (Argentina)
- Running time: 108 minutes
- Country: Argentina
- Language: Spanish

Goyo is a 2024 Argentine romantic comedy film directed and written by Marcos Carnevale which stars Nicolás Furtado, Nancy Dupláa and Soledad Villamil. It premiered on Netflix on 5 July 2024.

== Cast ==
- Nicolás Furtado
- Nancy Dupláa
- Soledad Villamil
- Pablo Rago
- Cecilia Roth

== Production ==
The film was announced on Netflix. The principal photography of the film started in October 2023. The filming was wrapped up in December 2023.

== Reception ==
On the review aggregator website Rotten Tomatoes, 75% of 8 critics' reviews are positive, with an average rating of 5.7/10. Jose Solis of Common Sense Media awarded the film 3/5 stars. Mrinal Rajaram of Cinema Express rated the film 3 stars out of 5. Guillermo Courau of La Nación gave the film 3/5 stars. Juan Pablo Russo of EscribiendoCine rated the film 6/10. Pablo O. Scholz of Clarín, John Serba of Decider and R. Viswanathan of The Week reviewed the film.
