= Adriana Varela =

Argentine tango singer

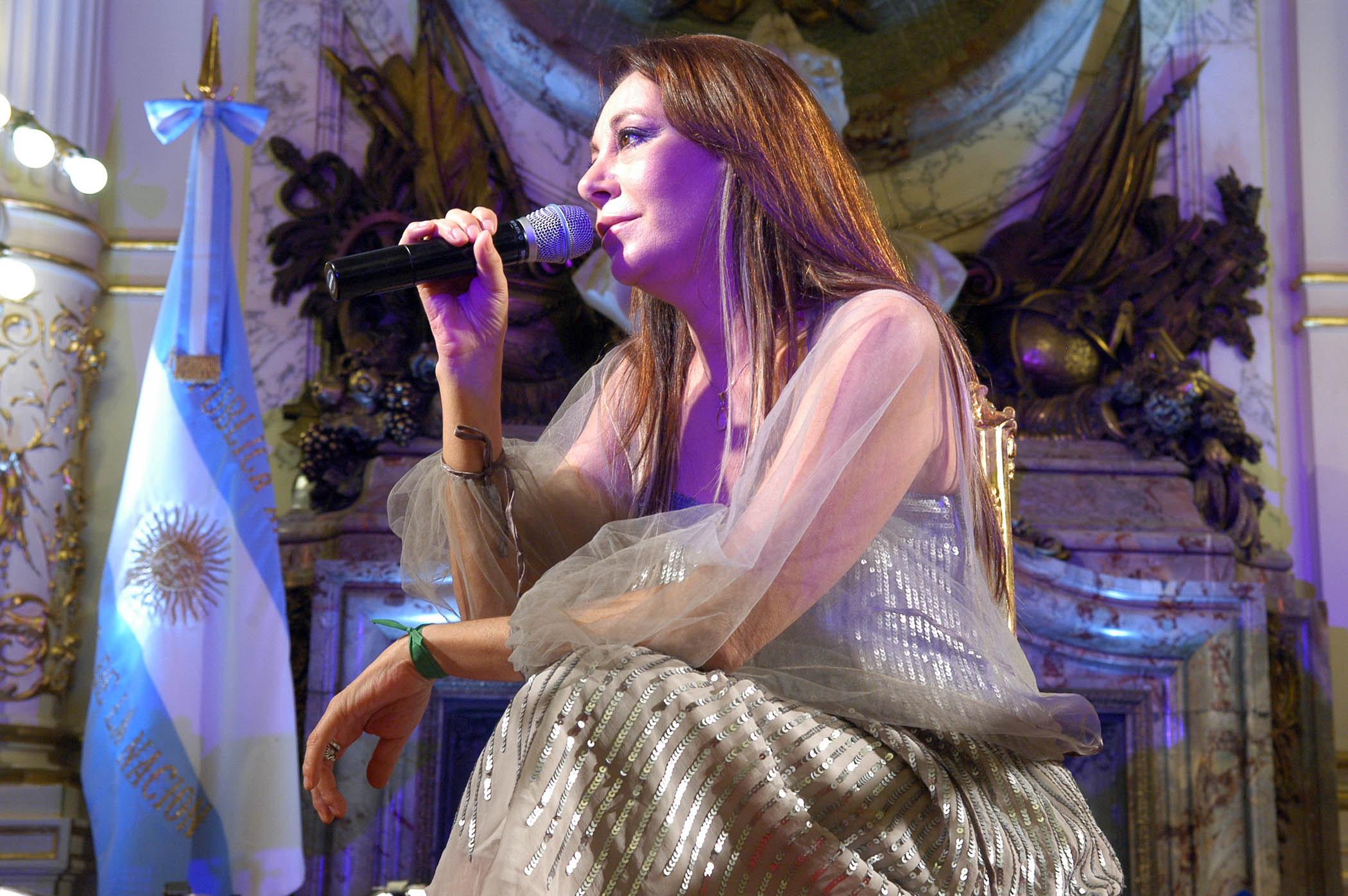
- Adriana Varela performing in 2008

Background information
- Born: Beatriz Adriana Lichinchi; May 9, 1952 (age 73); Piñeyro, Buenos Aires, Argentina
- Origin: Avellaneda, Buenos Aires, Argentina
- Occupation: Singer
- Years active: 1991–present
- Website: http://www.adrianavarelatango.com/

Adriana Varela (born Beatriz Adriana Lichinchi on May 9, 1952 in Avellaneda, Argentina) is an Argentine tango singer, with a successful career that encompasses many records, as well as minor movie roles.

== Summary ==
Adriana Varela is regarded as one of the main Argentine tango singers of recent times, with a prominent singing career that begun in 1991 with a cassette named Tangos. Two years later she launched her second record, Maquillaje, where she also included her previous works. This record would prove very successful, with the special participation of renowned artists such as singer Roberto Goyeneche and pianist Virgilio Expósito. For this album she was awarded the ACE award two years in a row.

Between 1991 and 1996 she recorded three more albums, "Corazones Perversos", "Tangos De Lengue – Varela Canta A Cadícamo", and "Tango En Vivo", which was recorded live in June 1996 at the Coliseo Theatre in Buenos Aires.

Between the years 1996 and 1998 her fame increased, with her participation on famous festivals such as "La Mar De Músicas" in Cartagena, the Porto Alegre festival, and the Grec Festival in Barcelona.

In the years that followed, she created the album "Cuando El Río Suena", under the artistic direction of Jaime Roos, and has participated in the Bajofondo Tango Club alternative "electro-tango" group, where she has a notable performance as lead singer in the songs "Perfume" and "Mi Corazón", among others. Her latest album, "Adriana Varela y piano", was released in 2014 and features accompaniment by pianist Marcelo Macri. "Adriana Varela y piano" is a selection drawn from three live concerts in the Punta del Este region. In December 2014, they performed songs from this album at Teatro ND in Buenos Aires.

Varela has also acted minor roles in movies such as Al Corazón, directed by Mario Sábato, and in Marcelo Piñeyro's Plata Quemada, and is also known for her outspoken left-wing politics, which she has never attempted to hide.

== Discography ==
Albums

- Tangos (1991)
- Maquillaje (1993)
- Corazones Perversos (1994)
- Tangos De Lengue – Varela Canta A Cadícamo (1995)
- Grandes Éxitos (1995)
- Tangos de colección (1995)
- Vuelve El Tango (1996)
- Tango En Vivo (1997)
- Cuando El Río Suena (1999)
- Toda Mi Vida (1999)
- Más Tango (2000)
- Tangos de lengue (2000)
- Vivo (CD+DVD) (2005)
- Encaje (2006)
- Música en el Salón Blanco (live) (DVD + VHS) (2008)
- Docke (2009)
- Adriana Varela y piano (2014)
- Avellaneda (2017)

Contributing artist

- Unwired: Acoustic Music from Around the World (1999) World Music Network
- Unwired: Latin America (2001) World Music Network
