= Haley Bennett =

American actress (born 1988)

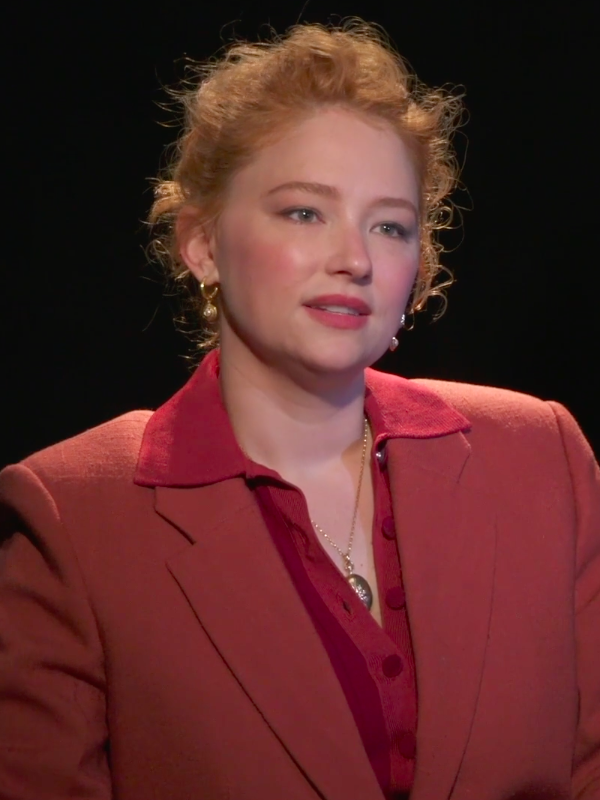
- Bennett in 2021
- Born: Haley Loraine Keeling; January 7, 1988 (age 38); Fort Myers, Florida, U.S.
- Occupation: Actress
- Years active: 2007–present
- Partner(s): Joe Wright (2017–present)
- Children: 1

Haley Loraine Keeling (born January 7, 1988), known professionally as Haley Bennett, is an American actress. She made her film debut in the romantic comedy Music and Lyrics (2007) and has since appeared in films such as The Equalizer (2014), The Magnificent Seven (2016), Swallow (2019), Hillbilly Elegy (2020), and Cyrano (2021).

== Early life ==
Bennett was born Haley Loraine Keeling in Fort Myers, Florida, on January 7, 1988. Her parents, Leilani (née Dorsey) and Ronald Keeling, met in church and hitchhiked to Florida while Leilani was pregnant with her. Leilani has German-Romanian ancestry through her maternal grandfather and Lithuanian ancestry through her maternal grandmother. Ronald has Scottish ancestry through his maternal grandmother. Bennett was raised in Naples, Florida. Her parents divorced when she was six years old and she moved to Ohio with her father, who opened an automobile repair shop there. They moved regularly around the state, with Bennett later saying, "There was no time when I lived anywhere longer than two years. I was always a social outcast. Maybe I didn't care what people thought because I was like, 'Well, I probably won't stick around here for too long.'" Bennett describes her childhood as "nomadic", as she moved between living with her father in Ohio and her mother in Florida:

I lived somewhat of a nomadic life even when I lived in Ohio. We spent time in rural areas, in suburban areas, never really city areas. We rode four-wheelers. We had pigs and ferrets. And creeks. We had a creek in my backyard. It was like Huckleberry Finn... I was kind of a tomboy for awhile. It's tough to explain because I grew up with my mom and my dad simultaneously but separately because they weren't together. So I kind of get femininity from my mother and boyishness from my dad. He loved fishing, he loves hunting, he loves boating, and football, baseball, and basketball. So that really saturated my life. And then my mother was very soft and also strong, but more of an artist. So I kind of had the best of both worlds.

When Bennett was 10, she and her father moved to Stow, where she attended Stow-Munroe Falls High School. At 13, she enrolled at Barbizon Modeling School in Akron. She attended the International Modeling and Talent Convention in 2001 and 2006, where she won a major award, acted in school plays, and sang in choirs. She also lived with her mother in Naples occasionally, where she attended Barron G. Collier High School, and studied music and acting. When Bennett was 18, she persuaded her mother to take her to Los Angeles for three months to pursue an acting career. Just as she was about to return home, she managed to secure representation by claiming to her prospective agent that a highly regarded agency had approached her; the agent refused to lose Bennett and signed her. She began using one of her mother's former married names as her stage name.

== Career ==
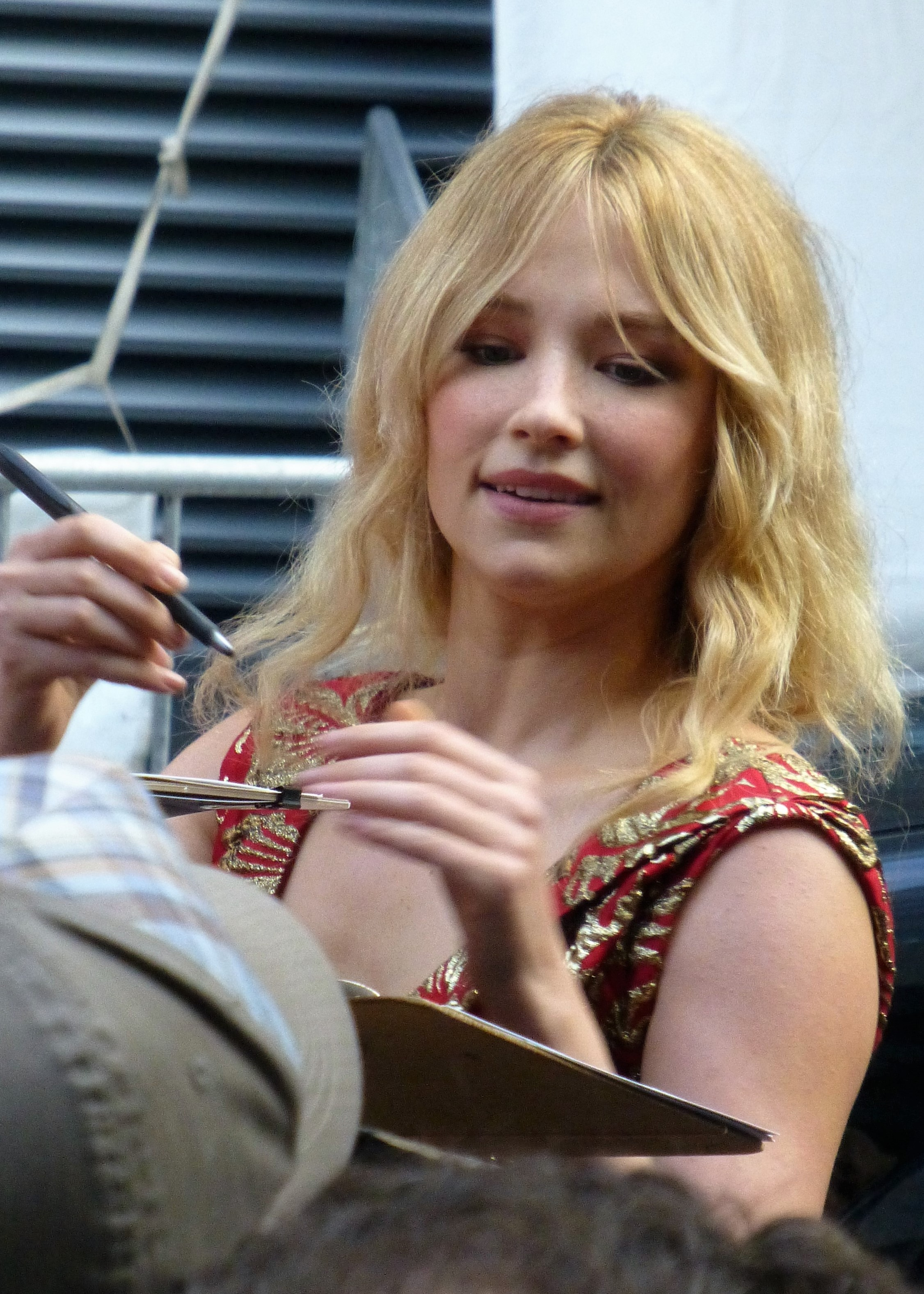
Bennett at the 2016 Toronto International Film Festival

In what was only her third audition, Bennett won the role of popstar Cora Corman for her film debut in the 2007 romantic comedy Music and Lyrics. She sang several songs for the film's soundtrack, including "Buddha's Delight" and "Way Back into Love"; fragments of the songs "Entering Bootytown" and "Slam" are heard during concert scenes in the film, and her song "Invincible" plays during the end credits. That same year, she signed with 550 Music/NuSound Records (part Epic Records), and began working on her debut album, though one was never released. Bennett performed her first live concert at The Mint in Los Angeles on June 19, 2008. Despite the auspicious film debut, Bennett did not break through.

After signing a three-picture deal with Warner Bros. (beginning with Music and Lyrics), Bennett subsequently starred in her second and third films, the comedy College (2008) and the supernatural horror The Haunting of Molly Hartley (2008). Also in 2008, she made a cameo appearance in Marley & Me. The following year, Bennett had a lead role alongside Julia Stiles in Shekhar Kapur's short film Passage. She then co-starred as Julie Campbell in the horror thriller film The Hole, directed by Joe Dante. In 2010, she appeared in the fantasy comedy Kaboom, and the drama Arcadia Lost. In July 2010, Bennett was cast in the FX crime-drama series Outlaw Country alongside Luke Grimes, Mary Steenburgen and John Hawkes. The pilot was filmed in 2010 before a rewrite and reshoots in April 2011. It remained in limbo until November 2011, when FX announced that it had not been picked up for a series. The hour-and-a-half long pilot was broadcast as a TV film on August 24, 2012.

Bennett then landed the lead in the thriller film Kristy (2014). She next appeared in the independent drama film Lost in the White City (2014), alongside Thomas Dekker and Bob Morley. Also in 2014, Bennett appeared in The Equalizer with Denzel Washington and Melissa Leo.

In 2015, Bennett starred in Ilya Naishuller's first-person point-of-view film Hardcore Henry. In 2016, she appeared as Emma Cullen in Antoine Fuqua's The Magnificent Seven, co-starred as Megan Hipwell in the Tate Taylor-directed film adaptation of Paula Hawkins' thriller novel The Girl on the Train, and played actress Mamie Murphy in Warren Beatty's comedy-drama Rules Don't Apply. Responses to the first two films were mixed, while the third was more positively received. Bennett's performances were praised in all three. In 2017, Bennett played Saskia Schumann in Jason Hall's PTSD drama film Thank You for Your Service. She had also been cast in Terrence Malick's musical drama film Song to Song, alongside Christian Bale, but her scenes were later cut.

In 2019, she starred in and produced the psychological thriller Swallow, directed by Carlos Mirabella-Davis, revolving around a woman with pica. It had its world premiere at the Tribeca Film Festival in April 2019, where Bennett received the award for Best Actress. Her performance in the film received rave reviews from critics calling it "pitch-perfect", "extraordinary", and "masterful". That same year, she starred in The Red Sea Diving Resort directed by Gideon Raff, opposite Chris Evans.

In 2020, she co-starred in two adaptations of books: the drama thriller The Devil All the Time, directed by Antonio Campos and based upon the novel of the same name; and Hillbilly Elegy, directed by Ron Howard, both for Netflix.

She appeared in Eli Roth's Borderlands, an adaptation of the video game of the same name. Bennett joined Whoopi Goldberg in drama film Till written and directed by Chinonye Chukwu. She is starring in and producing the feature adaptation of Brood, a novel by Jackie Polzin. In 2025, she appeared in The Last Frontier from Apple TV.

== Personal life ==
In early 2017, Bennett began an affair with married English film director Joe Wright, with Wright's then-wife, musician Anoushka Shankar, subsequently filing for divorce. She gave birth to her first and Wright's third child, a daughter, on December 27, 2018. As of 2019, the family resides in Bruton, Somerset, England.

== Filmography ==
=== Film ===
Year	Title	Role	Notes
2007	Music and Lyrics	Cora Corman	
2008	College	Kendall	
2008	The Haunting of Molly Hartley	Molly Hartley	
2008	Marley & Me	Lisa	
2009	The Hole	Julie Campbell	
2009	Passage	Abby	Short film
2010	Kaboom	Stella	
2010	Arcadia Lost	Charlotte	
2013	Deep Powder	Natasha	
2014	After the Fall	Ruby	
2014	Kristy	Justine Wills	
2014	Lost in the White City	Eva	
2014	The Equalizer	Mandy	
2015	Hardcore Henry	Estelle	
2016	A Kind of Murder	Ellie Briess	
2016	The Magnificent Seven	Emma Cullen	
2016	The Girl on the Train	Megan Hipwell	
2016	Rules Don't Apply	Mamie Murphy	
2017	Song to Song		Scenes deleted
2017	Thank You for Your Service	Saskia Schumann	
2019	Swallow	Hunter	Also executive producer
2019	The Red Sea Diving Resort	Rachel Reiter	
2020	The Devil All the Time	Charlotte Russell	
2020	Hillbilly Elegy	Lindsay	
2021	Cyrano	Roxanne	
2022	Till	Carolyn Bryant	
2022	She Is Love	Patricia	
2023	Magazine Dreams	Jessie	Released theatrically in 2025
2023	Widow Clicquot	Barbe-Nicole Ponsardin Clicquot	
2024	Race for Glory: Audi vs. Lancia	The Journalist	
2024	Borderlands	Lilith's mom	
2024	The Luckiest Man in America	Patricia	
2026	Virginia Woolf's Night and Day	Katherine Hilbery	

=== Television ===
Year	Title	Role	Notes
2025	The Last Frontier	Sidney Scofield	Apple TV series
