= Passage (2009 film) =

American-Swiss drama short film

- Directed by: Shekhar Kapur
- Written by: Sheila Callaghan; Amy Kaufman
- Produced by: Leopoldo Gout; Everardo Valerio Gout; Hilary Downes; Amy Kaufman
- Starring: Haley Bennett; Lily Cole; Julia Stiles
- Cinematography: Benoît Debie
- Edited by: Jacob Craycroft
- Music by: A.R. Rahman
- Production company: Swarovski Entertainment
- Distributed by: Curious Pictures
- Release date: August 6, 2009 (Rhode Island Festival)
- Running time: 16 minutes
- Countries: United States; Switzerland
- Language: English

Passage is a 2009 American-Swiss drama short film, the first to be directed by Shekhar Kapur, starring Haley Bennett, Lily Cole and Julia Stiles.

== Premise ==
Three estranged sisters reunite one night when the oldest comes back for her two younger sisters after leaving them years before in mysterious circumstances.

== Cast ==
- Haley Bennett as Abby
- Lily Cole as Tania
- Julia Stiles as Ella
- Agustina Cabo as little Tania
- Pilar Calviello as little Ella
- Maite Lanata as little Abby
- Tomas Decurgez as Abby's boyfriend
- Ricardo Merkin as conductor
- Vikram Chatwal as man in bar

== Production ==
The music for Passage was composed by A.R. Rahman, and the project was shot in Buenos Aires, Federal District, Argentina. The film was financed by the Austrian company Swarovski and was screened in their "Swarovski Crystal Worlds".

== Response ==
In noting Shekhar Kapur was already known for Elizabeth: The Golden Age, toward Passage Quiet Earth wrote that "the photography and the possibilities of the storyline are just way too good to pass up."
