= Maite Lanata =

Argentine actress (born 2000)

- Born: 21 April 2000 (age 26); Quilmes, Argentina
- Education: University of Buenos Aires; National University of the Arts
- Occupation: Actress
- Years active: 2009–present

Maite Lanata (born 21 April 2000) is an Argentine actress. She gained recognition for her portrayal of Alma Bilbao, an autistic child, in the telenovela El elegido. Her performance earned her a Martín Fierro Award in the Revelation category.

She later played Luna Lunati in the series El marginal and Juani in the telenovela 100 días para enamorarse, the latter role notable for depicting a transgender teenager's transition. For this performance, she received the 2018 Martín Fierro Award for Best Supporting Actress.

== Early life ==
Maite was born on 21 April 2000 in Quilmes, Buenos Aires Province. During her childhood, she relocated with her family to Colegiales, in the City of Buenos Aires. She started acting as a hobby early in her childhood.

== Career ==
From 2009 to 2012, Lanata studied acting at the Escuela de Nora Moseinco. Her early screen work included two short films: Mineros de Chile (directed by Nicolás Puenzo, 2009) and Passage (directed by Shekhar Kapur, 2009). In 2010, after an extended casting process, she was selected for the lead role of Julia Castillo in Javier Van de Couter's debut film Mia, which explored the lives of transgender women in marginalized communities. The film's release preceded Argentina’s passage of the Gender Identity Law (2012).

In 2011, Lanata portrayed Alma Bilbao, an autistic girl, in the telenovela El elegido (Telefe). The role marked one of Argentine television’s first depictions of autism during prime-time programming. To prepare, she underwent a three-month training period focused on breathing techniques and concentration methods.

From 2012 to 2013, Lanata continued advanced acting studies with Nora Moseinco, and later attended workshops at IUNA (now the National University of the Arts), including Introducción al Teatro del Oprimido and Disparando texto en acción (2015). That same year, she played Luna Lunati in El marginal (2015–2016), a manipulative teenager whose kidnapping drives the series' plot.

In 2018, Lanata portrayed Juani, a transgender teenager, in 100 días para enamorarse, a role that depicted gender transition and familial support, a narrative first for Argentine television. Her performance earned the 2018 Martín Fierro Award for Best Supporting Actress and received praise from LGBTQ+ advocacy groups.

She made her theatrical debut in Carla Moure's Jazmín de Invierno (2018), playing the titular character at ages 10 and 18. Later that year, she joined the cast of El jardín de bronce season 2 as Casilda/Moira Danubio, starring alongside Joaquín Furriel.

Lanata is a social communication student at the University of Buenos Aires.

== Filmography ==
=== Film ===
Year	Title	Role	Notes
2009	Mineros de Chile	Daughter	Short film
2009	Passage	Little Abby	Short film
2011	Mía	Julia Castillo	
2015	Francis: Pray for Me	Amalia	
2018	Yanka y el espíritu del volcán	Yanka	
2019	Bruja	Fátima	
2019	4 metros	Gabi	
2020	Intuition	Minerva del Valle	
2021	La sombra del gato	Emma	
2022	El paraíso	Young Magdalena Scilko	Voice role
2023	Lennons	Beggar	
2025	Gatillero	Isa	

=== Television ===
Year	Title	Role	Notes
2010	Lo que el tiempo nos dejó	Patricia	Episode: "Los niños que escriben en el cielo"
2010–2011	Contra las cuerdas	Dalma	
2011	El elegido	Alma Bilbao	
2014	Somos familia	Malena Miranda	
2014	La celebración	Lula	Episode: "Niño"
2016	Ultimátum	Cecilia Lociur	
2016	Estocolmo	Inés Pardo	
2016–2022	El marginal	Luna Lunati	Main role (season 1 and 5); recurring (season 3)
2017–2023	El jardín de bronce	Moira Danubio / Casilda Rauch	Main role (season 2-3), guest (season 1)
2018	100 días para enamorarse	"Juani" Castelnuovo Salinas	Main role
2019	Argentina, tierra de amor y venganza	Carmen Trauman	Main role (season 1, part 2)
2023	El reino	Alejandra Orsi	Recurring role (season 2)
2023	Prócer	Eva Perón	Episode: "Eva Perón"
2025	En el barro	Luna Lunati	Post-production
