= El marginal =

Argentine crime drama television series

- Genre: Crime drama
- Created by: Sebastián Ortega; Adrián Caetano
- Written by: Adrián Caetano; Guillermo Salmerón; Silvina Olschansky; Omar Quiroga; Nicolás Marina; Andrés Pascaner; Natalia Torres; Gabriel Macias
- Directed by: Israel Adrián Caetano; Luis Ortega; Mariano Ardanaz; Javier Pérez; Alejandro Ciancio
- Starring: Various: Juan Minujín; Nicolás Furtado; Claudio Rissi; Gerardo Romano; Martina Gusmán; Carlos Portaluppi; Abel Ayala; Brian Buley; Daniel Pacheco; Marcelo Peralta; Emanuel García; Jorge Lorenzo; Mariano Argento; Gerardo Otero; Adriana Salonia; Maite Lanata; Aylin Prandi; Esteban Lamothe; Nacho Sureda; Roly Serrano; Diego Cremonesi; Verónica Llinás; Rodrigo Noya; Daniel Fanego; Lorenzo Ferro; Alejandro Awada; Osqui Guzmán; Ana María Picchio; Denis Corat; David Masajnik; Rodolfo Ranni; Luis Luque; Ariel Staltari; María Leal
- Opening theme: "El marginal" by Sara Hebe; "Entre cuatro paredes" by Duki and Vicentico, composed by UTF-8 (season 3)
- Country of origin: Argentina
- Original language: Spanish
- No. of seasons: 5
- No. of episodes: 43

Production
- Executive producer: Gustavo Errico
- Producer: Sebastián Ortega
- Cinematography: Sergio Dotta
- Running time: 45–82 minutes
- Production companies: Underground Producciones; Televisión Pública

Original release
- Network: Televisión Pública
- Release: 2 June 2016 – 27 August 2019
- Network: Netflix
- Release: 19 January – 4 May 2022

Related
- The Inmate

El marginal is an Argentine crime drama television series created by Sebastián Ortega and Adrián Caetano through Underground Producciones for the channel Televisión Pública. Its first season, consisting of 13 episodes, starred an ensemble cast featuring Juan Minujín, Nicolás Furtado, Claudio Rissi, Gerardo Romano, Martina Gusmán, Carlos Portaluppi, Abel Ayala, Brian Buley, Daniel Pacheco, Marcelo Peralta, Emanuel García, Jorge Lorenzo, Mariano Argento, Gerardo Otero, Adriana Salonia, Maite Lanata, and Aylin Prandi, and was broadcast from 2 June to 8 September 2016, later becoming available on Netflix on 7 October 2016. It received the Golden Martín Fierro award, a Tato award, a Series Mania award, and was also nominated for a Platino Award for Best Miniseries or TV series.

Following the success of the first season, a second season was ordered, with Esteban Lamothe, Nacho Sureda, Roly Serrano, Diego Cremonesi, Verónica Llinás, Rodrigo Noya, and Daniel Fanego joining the cast. A prequel, it premiered on 17 July 2018, consisting of eight episodes and concluding on 4 September; it was released on Netflix on 28 September. An American adaptation, The Inmate, was released later that year on Telemundo.

The eight-episode third season premiered on 9 July 2019 and concluded on 27 August, with Lorenzo Ferro, Alejandro Awada, Osqui Guzmán, Ana María Picchio, Denis Corat, and David Masajnik as new cast members. It was released on Netflix on 27 September 2019. The fourth and fifth seasons were released exclusively on Netflix on 19 January 2022 and 4 May 2022 consisting of eight and six episodes, respectively. Rodolfo Ranni, Luis Luque, and Ariel Staltari joined in the fourth, with María Leal added in the fifth. A female-led spin-off series, En el barro, is currently in production by Netflix.

== Series overview ==
| Season | Episodes | Originally released | | |
| Season | Episodes | First released | Last released | Network |
|---|---|---|---|---|
| 1 | 13 | 2 June 2016 | 8 September 2016 | Televisión Pública |
| 2 | 8 | 17 July 2018 | 4 September 2018 | Televisión Pública |
| 3 | 8 | 9 July 2019 | 27 August 2019 | Televisión Pública |
| 4 | 8 | 19 January 2022 | | Netflix |
| 5 | 6 | 4 May 2022 | | Netflix |

In the first season, former cop Miguel Palacios is jailed at San Onofre under a fake name and a fake judicial case. His mission is to infiltrate a criminal gang of prisoners and prison guards and gather information about the daughter of a judge kidnapped by said gang.

The second season is a prequel that takes place three years before Miguel Palacios infiltrated San Onofre. Mario Borges and Juan Pablo "Diosito" Borges are sent to San Onofre where they plan to overthrow the leader of the prison, "El Sapo" Quiroga. To achieve that, they ally themselves with the "Sub-21" gang and with Patricio Salgado, a doctor with a mysterious past.

In the third season, a continuation of the events from season two the Borges brothers are tasked with taking care of Cristian Pardo, the son of an important businessman, who killed his friend while drunk in a car accident. While Diosito is tasked with the boy's care, the "Sub-21" joins with "Pantera" and Bruni to take down the Borges.

== Cast and characters ==
=== Main cast ===
Bold Lead characters

| Actor | Character | El marginal | | | | | En el Barro | |
| Actor | Character | Season 1 | Season 2 | Season 3 | Season 4 | Season 5 | Season 1 | Season 2 |
| Actor | Character | 2016 | 2018 | 2019 | 2022 | 2022 | 2025 | 2026 |
|---|---|---|---|---|---|---|---|---|
| Juan Minujín | Miguel Palacios aka Osvaldo "Pastor" Peña | Main | | Guest | Main | Main | Guest | Guest |
| Martina Gusmán | Licensed Emma Molinari † | Main | Main | Main | Main | | | |
| Gerardo Romano | Principal Sergio Antín | Main | Main | Main | Main | Main | Main | Main |
| Claudio Rissi | Mario Borges † | Main | Main | Main | Main | Main | | |
| Carlos Portaluppi | "Morcilla" † | Main | Main | Main | | | | |
| Nicolás Furtado | Juan Pablo "Diosito" Borges † | Main | Main | Main | Main | Main | | |
| Gerardo Otero | Fernando Palacios † | Main | | | | | | |
| Adriana Salonia | Lucrecia | Main | | | | | | |
| Mariano Argento | Judge Cayetano Lunati † | Main | | Recurring | | | | |
| Abel Ayala | César Pérez | Main | Main | Main | Main | Main | | |
| Maite Lanata | Luna Lunati | Main | | Recurring | | Main | Recurring | |
| Enrique Liporace | "Verruga" † | Main | | | | | | |
| Mercedes Scápola | Betina Espósito † | Main | | | | | | |
| Cristina Banegas | Élida Garibaldi | Main | | | | | | |
| Eugenia Alonso | Terapeuta | Main | | | | | | |
| Adrián Navarro | Gastón Belardo | Main | | Guest | | | | |
| Julieta Zylberberg | Silvia Palacios † | Main | | | Main | | | |
| Chang Sung Kim | Jun "Soja" Sung † | Main | | | | | | |
| Esteban Lamothe | Patricio "Doc" Salgado | | Main | | | | | |
| Roly Serrano | "Sapo" Quiroga † | | Main | Recurring | | | | |
| Verónica Llinás | Rita † | | Main | | | | | |
| Daniel Fanego | Garófalo † | | Main | | | | | |
| Lorenzo Ferro | Cristian "Moco" Pardo | | | Main | | | | |
| Ana María Picchio | Estela Morales | | | Main | | | | |
| Alejandro Awada | Oliverio Bruni † | | | Main | | | | |
| Ariel Staltari | José "Bardo" Muriazo † | | | | Main | Main | | |
| Daniel Pacheco | James "Colombia" † | Recurring | Recurring | Recurring | Main | Main | | |
| Ana Garibaldi | Gladys Guerra | Recurring | Recurring | Recurring | Main | Main | Main | Main |
| Rodolfo Ranni | Principal Benito Galván † | | | | Main | | | |
| Luis Luque | "Coco" † | | | | Main | | | |
| María Leal | Judge María Virginia Piñeiro | | | | | Main | | |

= Inmates of San Onofre/Puente Viejo
= Pastor's family
= San Onofre/Puente Viejo staff
= Lunati's family
= Borges's family

== Distribution ==
The series was initially aired on the Televisión Pública channel. It was acquired by Netflix after the end of the original run, becoming available for Latin America, the United States, the United Kingdom, Spain and Portugal. El Marginal and Estocolmo were the first Argentine television series acquired by Netflix in 2016.

A second season was confirmed in 2017. It debuted on Argentine television on 17 July 2018 to high ratings. The third season was confirmed in September 2018, and premiered on 9 July 2019.

The fourth and fifth seasons were released exclusively on Netflix on 19 January and 4 May 2022, respectively.

== Awards ==
The program received eight nominations for the Martín Fierro Awards, and won for best miniseries and best writers. One of the producers thanked for the award, but criticized the organization of the nominations, as they sometimes include television programs from very disparate genres. Actor Gerardo Romano used his brief time to ask people to vote for Cristina Fernández de Kirchner at the 2017 legislative elections. At the end of the ceremony, the program received the Golden Martín Fierro Award.
