= Porn for Newbies =

- Theatrical release poster
- Directed by: Carlos Ameglio
- Written by: Carlos Ameglio; Leonel D'Agostino; Bruno Cancio
- Produced by: Paula Cosenza; Denise Gomes; Cecilia Mato; Ignacio Rey; Mariana Secco
- Starring: Martín Piroyansky; Nicolás Furtado
- Cinematography: Diego Rosenblatt
- Edited by: Mariano Báez
- Music by: Alexandre Kassin
- Production companies: Salado Films; Río Rojo Contenidos; Bossa Nova Films
- Release dates: November 16, 2018 (Mar del Plata); October 3, 2019 (Uruguay & Argentina)
- Running time: 93 minutes
- Countries: Uruguay; Argentina; Brazil
- Language: Spanish

Porn for Newbies (Spanish: Porno para principiantes) is a 2018 Uruguayan-Argentine-Brazilian comedy film directed by Carlos Ameglio and written by Ameglio, Leonel D'Agostino and Bruno Cancio. The film stars Martín Piroyansky and Nicolás Furtado. The film was named on the shortlist for Uruguayan's entry for the Academy Award for Best International Feature Film at the 93rd Academy Awards, but it was not selected.

== Synopsis ==
Víctor, an amateur filmmaker, is about to sell his camera in order to get married, when a not very legal "businessman" named Boris, offers him to direct a film. Excited, he accepts the proposal, but what he did not expect is that he would end up filming a porn version of Bride of Frankenstein. His friend Aníbal, a video store employee obsessed with pornography, will accompany him on the mission. Everything will get complicated when Víctor falls in love with the protagonist of his film, the international porn star Ashley Cummings.

== Cast ==
The actors participating in this film are:

- Martín Piroyansky as Víctor Medina
- Nicolás Furtado as Aníbal
- Carolina Mânica as Ashley Cummings
- Daniel Aráoz as Boris
- Nuria Fló as Leticia
- Roberto Suárez as Father Simón
- Denny Brechner as Joaquín
- Jorge Bazzano as Néstor

== Release ==
It had its world premiere on November 16, 2018, at the 33rd Mar del Plata International Film Festival. It was commercially released on October 3, 2019, in Uruguayan and Argentine theaters.
