= El paraíso (2022 film) =

- Theatrical release poster
- Directed by: Fernando Sirianni; Federico Breser
- Screenplay by: Fernando Sirianni
- Based on: Tierra de rufianes by Federico Breser
- Produced by: Fernando Sirianni
- Starring: Norma Aleandro; Nicolás Furtado; Maite Lanata; Jorge Marrale; Alejandro Awada
- Edited by: Dante Martínez; Fernando Sirianni
- Music by: Santiago Walsh
- Production companies: FS Entertainment; Nomad Cine; EOK Producciones; McFly Studio
- Distributed by: Méliès Cinematográfica
- Release date: 8 September 2022 (Argentina)
- Running time: 103 minutes
- Country: Argentina
- Language: Spanish

El paraíso (lit. 'The Paradise') is a 2022 Argentine adult animated thriller drama film directed by Fernando Sirianni and Federico Breser (in their directorial debut) which is based on the television series Tierra de rufianes created by Breser. It stars the voices of Norma Aleandro, Nicolás Furtado, Maite Lanata, Jorge Marrale and Alejandro Awada. It premiered on 8 September 2022, in Argentine theaters.

== Synopsis ==
Set in 1926, it tells the story of Magdalena and Anna Scilko, two sisters who come to Rosario from Poland to look for a better future. However, when they disembark, they realize that they were tricked into joining a human trafficking network that is managed by the Abramov brothers, some powerful criminals from the city.

== Cast ==
The actors participating in this film are:

- Norma Aleandro as Old Magdalena Scilko
- Nicolás Furtado as Ian Abramov
- Maite Lanata as Young Magdalena Scilko
- Jorge Marrale as León Abramov
- Alejandro Awada as Roco Falcao
- César Bordón as Juan Scilko
- Mariano Chiesa as Aaron Abramov
- Claudio Da Passano as Vicente
- Carlos Kaspar as Cónsul Ladislao
- Favio Posca as Lebrum
- Juana Viale as Madame Safó
- Marcos Woinsky as Vladimir
- Elena Roger as Singer
- Ernesto Larrese as Journalist
- Lourdes Isola as Anna Scilko
- Marcelo Armand as Judge
- Dante Martínez as Marquez
- Ignacio Rodríguez de Anca as Kaspar

== Reception ==
=== Critical reception ===
On Todas las críticas website, El paraíso has a 71% approval rating based on 17 reviews. Diego Batlle from Otros cines highlighted that "Paradise has a few successful climates and valuable visual ideas, although at times the animation looks a bit 'robotic', without reaching the fluidity and naturalness that surely could have been achieved if it had been told. with a bigger budget." Paula Vázquez Prieto from La Nación stated that the film "achieves a meticulous, clear and precise reconstruction" in its plot, but that it does not have a "carnal approach to those moral conflicts." Adrián Monserrat from Escribiendo cine wrote: "the film is an achievement, both from an aesthetic point of view and from the construction of the story", although he criticized that "3D animation is well conceived although it is not entirely efficient due to the unnatural movements of each character."

Ignacio Durand from El Destape Web wrote: "El paraíso is a film that goes along the expected lines, without surprises and appealing to some effective commonplaces, well used to enhance the drama in the strongest scenes." Manuel Villar Lifac from Clarín highlighted that in the film "the photographic realism of the settings in which this drama takes place has an impact" and "it is worth highlighting the power of the sound."

=== Accolades ===
Year	Award	Category	Recipient	Result	Ref.
2023	Platino Awards	Best Animated Film	El paraíso	Nominated	
2023	Argentine Film Critics Association	Best Original Song	«Un instante irreversible» by Elena Roger & Santiago Walsh	Won	
2024	Quirino Awards	Best Ibero-American Feature Film	El paraíso	Nominated	
