= El habilitado =

- Directed by: Jorge Cedron
- Written by: Miguel Briante; Jorge Cedron
- Cinematography: Juan Carlos Desanzo; José Santiso
- Edited by: Miguel Pérez
- Release date: 1971
- Running time: 78 minutes
- Country: Argentina
- Language: Spanish

El habilitado is a 1971 Argentine film. It was directed by Jorge Cedron, written by Miguel Briante and Cedron, and starred Héctor Alterio, Carlos Antón, and Billy Cedrón.

== Plot summary ==
The link between five employees of a Mar del Plata store who try to climb positions on their sad situation.

== Cast ==
- Héctor Alterio
- Carlos Antón
- Billy Cedrón
- Pablo Cedrón
- Gladys Cicagno
- Marta Gam
- José María Gutiérrez
- Claude Marting
- Norberto Pagani
- Ana María Picchio
- Alfredo Quesada
- Héctor Tealdi
- Walter Vidarte

== Reception ==
Director Cedrón was quoted in Clarín as saying, "They are not going to find in my film those vast theories about reality that some French filmmakers construct, I want them to find reality ... not a generalized, abstract reality ... In my film there is more room for the aesthetics of a Roberto Arlt, a Beckett let the signatures of some nouvelle addicts wander".

A review in Clarín read: "Film language stripped of all mannerisms, with stark images... each of the characters is precisely defined."

Manrupe and Portela wrote in Un diccionario de films argentinos that it was a "[g]ood approach to an office story, its pettiness and competitiveness."
