= The Tunnel (Sabato novel) =

Argentinian novel by Ernesto Sabato

- 1951 edition (publ. Emecé Editores)
- Author: Ernesto Sabato
- Original title: El túnel
- Language: Spanish
- Genre: Existentialism
- Publisher: Editorial Sur
- Publication date: 1948
- Publication place: Argentina
- ISBN: 978-0-14-310653-1
- OCLC: 1077504286

The Tunnel (Spanish: El túnel) is a dark, psychological novel written by Argentine writer Ernesto Sabato about a deranged porteño painter, Juan Pablo Castel, and his obsession with a woman. The story's title refers to the symbol for Castel's emotional and physical isolation from society, which becomes increasingly apparent as Castel proceeds to tell from his jail cell the series of events that enabled him to murder the only person capable of understanding him. Marked by its existential themes, El Túnel received enthusiastic support from Albert Camus and Graham Greene following its publication in 1948.

== Plot summary ==
The story begins with the main character introducing himself as "the painter who killed María Iribarne" before delving into the circumstances that led to their first encounter. Castel's obsession begins in the autumn of 1946 when at an exhibition of his work he notices a woman focusing on one particularly subtle detail of his painting "Maternidad" ("Maternity"). He considers this observation deeply significant since it is a detail that he values as the most important aspect of the painting but to which nobody besides him and the woman pay any attention.

Missing out on an opportunity to approach her before she leaves the exhibition, he then spends the next few months obsessing over her, thinking of ways to find her in the immensity of Buenos Aires, and fantasizing about what to say to her.

Ultimately, after seeing her entering a building which he presumes to be her place of employment, he considers how to go about asking her about the detail in the painting. He approaches her and learns that her name is María Iribarne. Following their discussion about the painting, Castel and María agree to see each other again. It later becomes clear that she is married to a blind man named Allende and lives on Posadas Street in the northern part of the city. As Castel continues to see María, however, their relationship comes to be dominated by his obsessive interrogations of her life with her husband, why she does not take her husband's last name, and of her inner thoughts, questions she is unable to answer to his satisfaction. Out of this disconnect, Castel's obsessive thoughts lead him to all sorts of irrational doubts about the love he has come to believe that they have for one another.

This anxiety intensifies after he and Maria make a trip to an estancia, a country ranch in Mar del Plata owned by Allende's cousin Hunter. The atmosphere, the presence and attitudes of the other visiting relatives, and realizing Hunter's jealousy all feed into Castel's paranoia, forcing him to flee the ranch with little more than a word to one of the service staff.

While waiting at a station to leave the region, Castel expects María to figure out he has left and to come stop him. She never arrives, confirming his negative feelings. Upon returning home to Buenos Aires, Castel passionately composes a hurtful letter, accusing her of sleeping with Hunter, which he immediately regrets upon mailing to her. He angrily but unsuccessfully attempts to convince a postal worker to retract the certified letter and later concludes that fate has decided it should reach its destination.

Later, Castel reaches María by phone: she reluctantly agrees to meet with him again, although she tells him that it will likely do them little good and, in fact, probably cause him more harm. When she does not arrive in Buenos Aires, he decides that María is, in fact, a prostitute who cheats on her husband not only with him, but also with Hunter and other men. In a fit of rage, he drives out to the estancia. There he waits hidden outside for guests to leave the large house. Meanwhile his anxiety grows to the point where he envisions himself and María passing each other through life in parallel passageways or tunnels, whereas he is "a single tunnel, dark and solitary: mine, the tunnel wherein passed all my infancy, my youth, my entire life."

Eventually, Castel enters the house, approaches María in her room, where he accuses her of leaving him alone in the world, and stabs her to death.

Following the attack, Castel shows up to Allende's office to tell him that he has murdered María for sleeping with Hunter, only to discover that Allende is well aware of his cuckold status. Crying out again and again that Castel is a fool, Allende sadly, and ineffectually, tries to fight Castel, who leaves and later turns himself in to the police.

== Film adaptations ==
- The Tunnel (1952), directed by León Klimovsky, with Laura Hildago and Carlos Thompson.
- El túnel (1977, TV movie), directed by José Luis Cuerda
- El túnel, also known as The Tunnel (1988), directed by Antonio Drove, with Jane Seymour and Peter Weller.
- The Passion of Martin (1990), directed by Alexander Payne. A comic adaptation of El túnel for his film school thesis project about a photographer who becomes obsessed with a girl he notices studying his work in a gallery.
