= Ana María Picchio =

Argentine actress (born 1946)

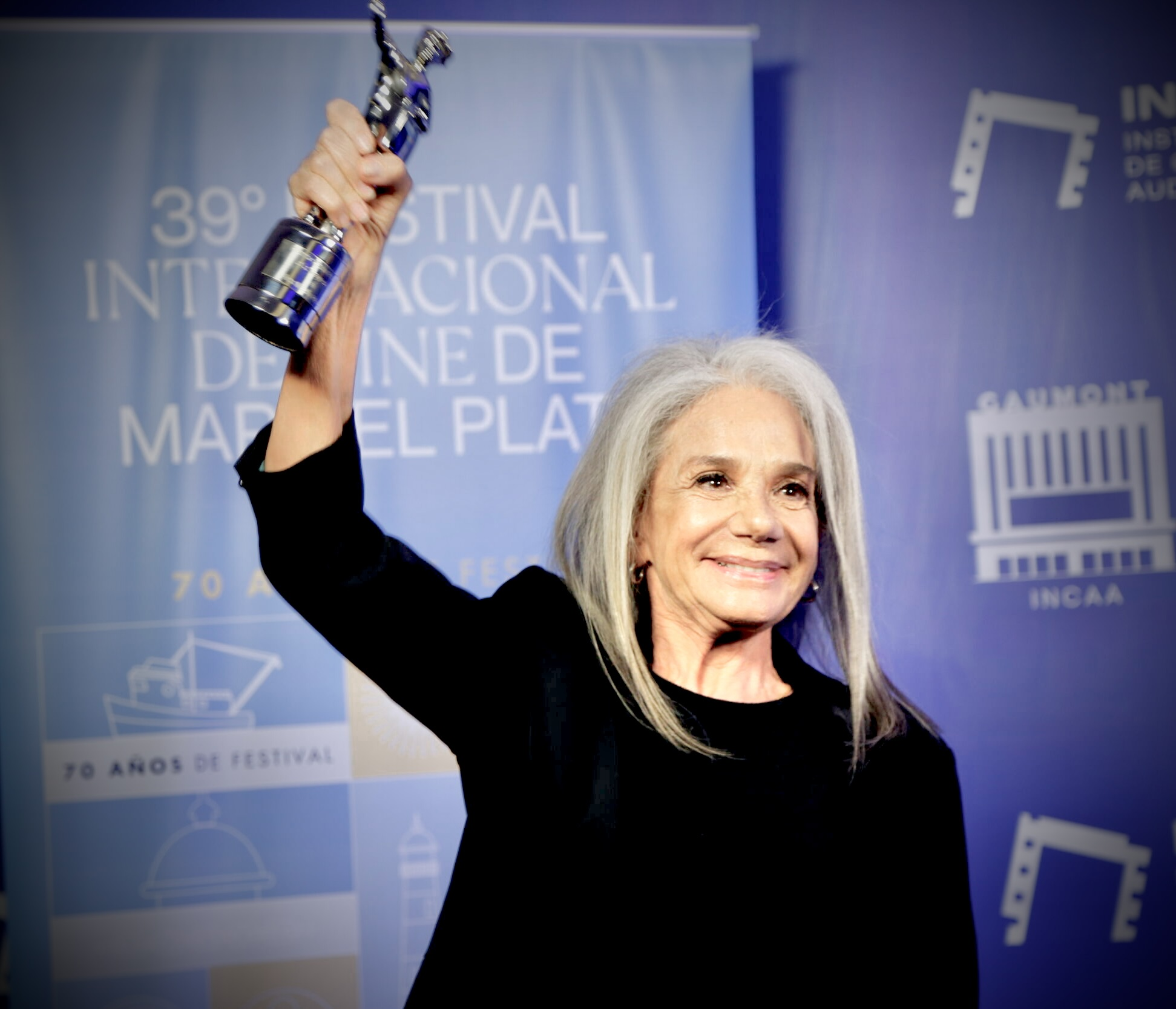
- Born: 30 March 1946 (age 80); Buenos Aires, Argentina
- Years active: 1964–present

Ana María Picchio (30 March 1946, in Buenos Aires) is an Argentine actress winner of the Silver Condor Award, Konex Award, Martín Fierro Awards and the Moscow International Film Festival

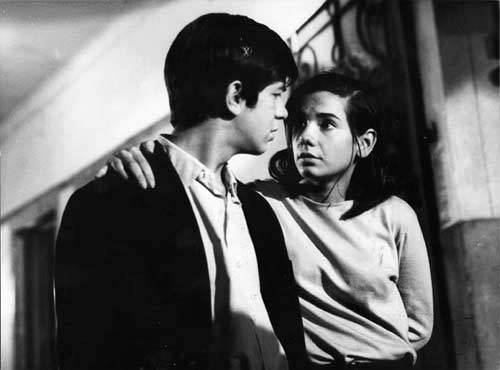
"Breve cielo"

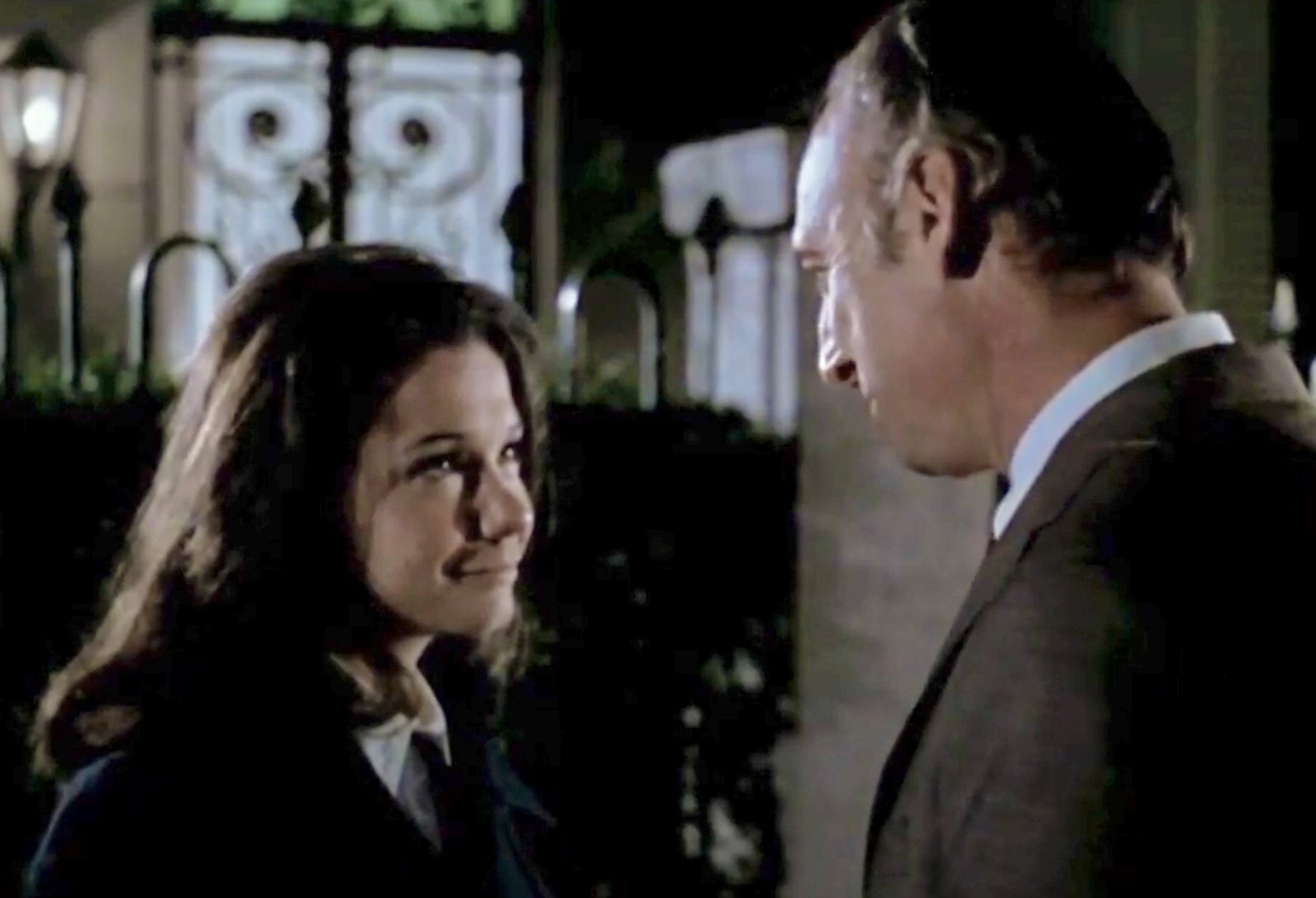
La tregua, Hector Alterio

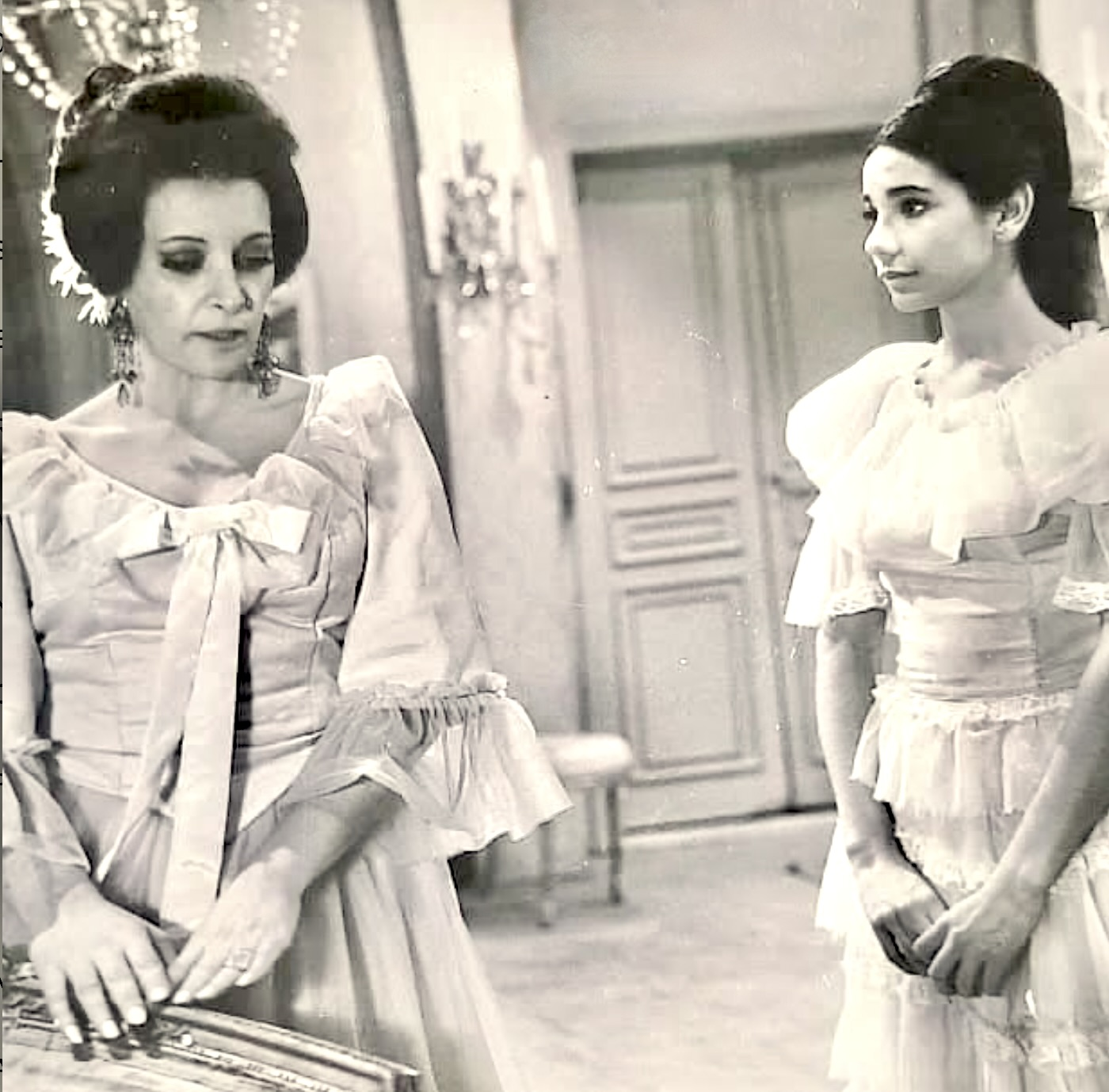
Pique Dame, Cipe Lincovsky, Ana Maria Picchio, 1972

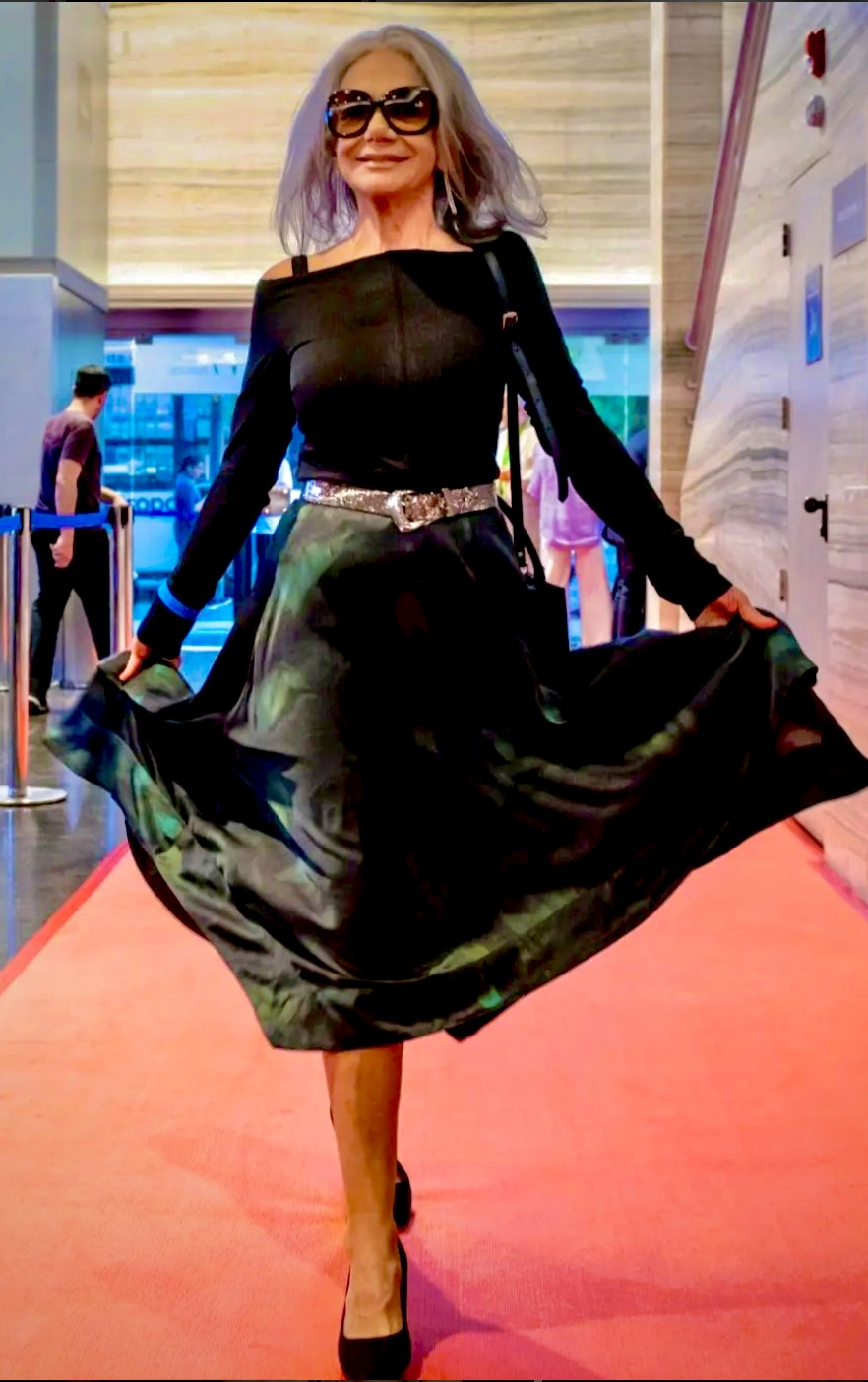

== Career ==
A graduate of the National Conservatory of Dramatic Arts, she made her theatrical debut in 1964 in Los prójimos (The Neighbors), by Carlos Gorostiza, marking the beginning of a distinguished stage career that would later expand decisively into television and film. Over the decades, her work has been recognized with numerous national and international awards, reflecting both her artistic range and her sustained influence in Argentine performing arts.

Her most notable film performances include David Jose Kohon's Brief Heaven (1969), Mario Benedetti's The Truce (1974 film)—the first Argentine film ever nominated for an Academy Award for Best Foreign Language Film—The film directed by Sergio Renan has since gained cult status in Argentina.It was selected as the eighth greatest Argentine film of all time in a poll conducted by the Museo del Cine Pablo Ducrós Hicken in 1984, while it ranked 6th in the 2000 edition and Chechechela, una chica de barrio (1986).

For her performance in Breve cielo, she received the Silver Condor Award for Best Actress from the Argentine Film Critics Association, as well as the Silver St. George Award for Best Actress at the Moscow International Film Festival. She later won a second Silver Condor for her role in Chechechela, una chica de barrio.

In theatre, she performed in works by a range of playwrights, such as Arthur Miller, Henrik Ibsen, Ramón del Valle-Inclán, Neil Simon, Roger Vitrac, Oscar Viale, and Wajdi Mouawad.

In television, she won nine nominations and won the Martín Fierro Awards in 1990 and 2016.

Her career-long contributions were formally acknowledged with the Konex Platinum Award for Lifetime Achievement in 1991, and in 2014 she received the Silver Condor Award for Career Achievement, cementing her legacy as one of the most significant figures in Argentine theatre and cinema.

== Selected Filmography ==
- Guía para muertos recientes (2022).
- Lo que nunca nos dijimos (2015).
- El espejo de los otros (2015).
- Angelita la doctora (2014).
- Cuando yo te vuelva a ver (2013).
- La cola (2011).
- Cómo se hizo el exilio de Gardel (2010).
- Nada por perder (2001).
- El mar de Lucas (1999).
- Fuga de cerebros (1998).
- Pequeños milagros (1997).
- Martín (Hache) (1997).
- Perdido por perdido (1993).
- Después de la tormenta (1991).
- Chechechela, una chica de barrio (1986).
- Pobre mariposa (1986).
- La mayoría silenciada, (1986).
- El exilio de Gardel (Tangos) (1985).
- La cruz invertida (1985).
- Tacos altos (1985).
- El rigor del destino (1985).
- Los días de junio (1985).
- Adiós, Roberto (1985).
- El sol en botellitas (1985).
- Asesinato en el Senado de la Nación (1984).
- Un hombre de arena (1983).
- Sentimental (Requiem para un amigo) (1981).
- De cara al cielo (1979).
- La Raulito (1975).
- Los días que me diste (1975).
- The Truce (1974).
- Los golpes bajos (1974).
- Operación Masacre (1972).
- La sartén por el mango (1972).
- La pandilla inolvidable (1972).
- Santos Vega (1971).
- El habilitado (1970).
- El Santo de la espada (1970).
- Breve cielo (1969).

== Theater ==
- 2025...............El Secreto
- 2021-2024.......Perdidamente
- 2018............... Plaza Suite
- 2016 ............... Franciscus.
- 2013 ............... Incendies (play)
- 2012 ............... Hembras, un encuentro de mujeres notables
- 2010/2011 ....... All My Sons (Kate Keller)
- 2009 ............... Tango turco
- 2007 ............... Un día muy particular
- 2005/2006 ....... El pan de la locura
- 2001/2003 ....... Made in Lanús
- 1996 ............... El mágico mundo de los cuentos
- 1995 ............... Algo en común
- 1994 ............... Juana Azurduy
- 1992................ Pijamas
- 1991 ............... Y... ¿Dónde están mis pantalones?
- 1989 ............... Extraña pareja
- 1988/1989 ....... El protagonista
- 1988 ............... Yo amo Carlos Paz
- 1987 ............... Gasalla es el Maipo y el Maipo es Gasalla
- 1981 ............... El último pasaje
- 1979 ............... Mujeres
- 1978 ............... Encantada de conocerlo
- 1973 ............... A Doll's House
- 1972 ............... Mea culpa
- 1967................ Víctor o los niños en el poder
- 1967 ............... Luces de bohemia
- 1966................ Atracción Fatal
- 1966................ Acerca de Chevalier
- 1965................ Judith y Holofernes
- 1965................ Una viuda difícil
- 1964 ............... Los prójimos

== Television ==
- Vis a vis: El oasis (2020)
- El marginal (2019)
- Esperanza Mía (2015)
- Solamente vos (2013)
- Sos mi hombre (2012)
- Condicionados (2012)
- El hombre de tu vida (2011)
- Enseñame a vivir (2009)
- Mujeres asesinas (2008)
- Mujeres de nadie (2007- 2008)
- Mujeres asesinas (2006)
- Amas de casa desesperadas (2006)
- Gladiadores de Pompeya (2006)
- Mujeres asesinas (2005)
- Panadería "Los Felipe" (2004)
- Los de la esquina (2004)
- Los Roldán (2004)
- Costumbres argentinas (2003)
- Infieles (2002)
- Los buscas de siempre (2000)
- Mamitas (1999)
- Como vos y yo (1998)
- De corazón (1997)
- Un solitario corazón (1996)
- Alta comedia (1995)
- La marca del deseo (1994)
- Son de Diez (1994)
- Con alma de tango (1994)
- Zona de riesgo (1993)
- Vendedoras de Lafayette (1988)
- Vínculos (1987)
- Ficciones (1987)
- Compromiso (1983)
- Nosotros y los miedos (1982)
- Hola Pelusa (1980)
- Andrea Celeste (1979)
- Renato (1978)
- El humor de Niní Marshall (1977)
- Tiempo de vivir (1977)
- Alguien por quien vivir (1975)
- El inglés de los güesos (1975)
