= The Inmate =

American television series

- Spanish: El Recluso
- Genre: Thriller drama
- Based on: El Marginal by Sebastián Ortega and Adrián Caetano
- Screenplay by: Joaquín Casasola; Enrique Vázquez; Gerónimo Barriga
- Directed by: Jorge Colón; Mariano Ardanaz; Alfonso Pineda
- Creative director: Jorge Colón
- Starring: Ignacio Serricchio; Ana Claudia Talancón
- Country of origin: United States
- Original language: Spanish
- No. of seasons: 1
- No. of episodes: 13

Production
- Executive producers: Luis Silberwasser; Peter Blacker; Ana Paula Valdovinos; Sebastián Ortega; Inna Payán; Marcos Santana
- Producer: Luis Salinas
- Camera setup: Multi-camera
- Production company: Telemundo International Studios

Original release
- Network: Telemundo
- Release: 25 September – 11 October 2018

The Inmate (Spanish: El Recluso) is an American television series produced by Telemundo Internacional Studios that premiered on Telemundo on 25 September 2018 and concluded on 11 October 2018. It is an adaptation of the Argentine television series titled El Marginal created by Sebastián Ortega and Adrián Caetano. The series tells the story of an ex-marine who enters a maximum security prison on the border between Mexico and the United States to investigate the kidnapping of the daughter of a prominent US judge.

== Plot ==
An American ex-marine, Lázaro Mendoza (Ignacio Serricchio) enters a maximum security prison in Mexico (La Rotunda), under a false identity and accused of an alleged triple homicide. Now as Dante Pardo, his mission is to infiltrate a dangerous gang of prisoners and guards that operates inside and outside the prison. They are the main suspects in the kidnapping of the teenage daughter of an American judge named John Morris (Guy Ecker). Within La Rotunda, Lázaro has to discover who is the mastermind of the kidnapping and discover the whereabouts of the girl.

== Cast ==
Confirmed cast.

- Ignacio Serricchio as Lázaro Mendoza / Dante Pardo
- Ana Claudia Talancón as Frida Villarreal
- Flavio Medina as Jorge Peniche
- Luis Felipe Tovar as Mariano Tavares
- David Chocarro as Juan Pablo 'Santito'
- Mariana Seoane as Roxana Castañeda
- Guy Ecker as John Morris
- Isabella Castillo as Linda Morris
- Bradley Stryker as Jack
- Gustavo Sánchez Parra as Cuauhtémoc
- Leonardo Ortizgris as Florentino
- Alejandro Calva as La Foca
- Rodrigo Oviedo as Silvestre Chávez
- Ramón Medina as Marcial Navarro
- Erik Hayser as Jeremy Jones
- Diego Calva as El Rubio
- Kristyan Ferrer as El Syka
- Juan Pablo Castañeda as El Picudo
- Héctor Suárez as Salvador Valencia 'El Procurador'
- Amador Torralba as Balin
- Armando Espitia as Bocinas
- Hector Kotsifakis as El Muerto
- Luis Daniel Muñoz as Cumbias
- Ricardo Esquerra as El Sobaco
- Moisés Arizmendi as Porfirio Mendoza
- Pepe Alonso as El Elegante
- Tiaré Scanda as Azucena Tavares
- Adriana Barraza as Guadalupe Mendoza
- Jolien Rutgers as Camila
- Vanesa Restrepo as Elvira
- Nacho Tahhan as Evaristo Galindo
- Cesar Ramos as Julian Mora

== Production ==
The series was unveiled by Telemundo at NAPTE 2018. Filming took place in Mexico during 2017. The first season will consist of 13 episodes.

== Ratings ==
Viewership and ratings per season of The Inmate
Season	Timeslot (ET)	Episodes	First aired		Last aired		Avg. viewers (millions)	18–49 rank
Season	Timeslot (ET)	Episodes	Date	Viewers (millions)	Date	Viewers (millions)	Avg. viewers (millions)	18–49 rank
1	Mon–Fri 10pm/9c	13	25 September 2018	1.54	11 October 2018	1.42	1.33	TBD

== Episodes ==
No.	Title	Directed by	Original release date	US viewers (millions)
1	"Dante Pardo es un infiltrado"	Jorge Colón & Mariano Ardanaz	25 September 2018	1.54
Accused of triple homicide, Lázaro Mendoza, a former marine, enters the prison, La Rotunda as Dante Pardo to fulfill a mission: rescue Linda, the daughter of Judge Morris.
2	"Dante tiene pistas de Linda"	Jorge Colón & Mariano Ardanaz	26 September 2018	1.38
Tavares, the leader of the gang that leads the prison, assigns Dante control of the courtyard, replacing La Foca. Dante hears that something happens to La Gringa, the young woman whom he must rescue.
3	"Dante y el pasadizo secreto"	Jorge Colón & Mariano Ardanaz	27 September 2018	1.45
A map and the instructions of an old assassin, still imprisoned in La Rotunda, take Dante through a tunnel that leads him to Linda's cell. His life is in danger, they persecute him tirelessly.
4	"Porfirio chantajea al juez"	Mariano Ardanaz & Alfonso Pineda Ulloa	28 September 2018	1.16
With the data that Dante gives him about Linda and behind the back of the undercover soldier, Porfirio blackmails the judge and pays half a million dollars. El Elegante is free, but refuses to leave.
5	"Ordenan el traslado de Linda"	Mariano Ardanaz & Alfonso Pineda Ulloa	1 October 2018	1.31
Tavares puts Santito in charge of the mission of moving Linda. Dante participates and manages to filter the location of the Ranch, where they take her. Judge Morris sends Jack to rescue his daughter.
6	"Ocultan a Linda"	Mariano Ardanaz & Alfonso Pineda Ulloa	2 October 2018	1.33
After the failed attempt, it is time to remove Linda from prison and do some maneuvers to avoid being discovered. Frida announces to Peniche that she opened an investigation.
7	"Morris traiciona a Dante"	Unknown	3 October 2018	1.35
The ranch where they have Linda, is surrounded by Morris snipers. The band of the Tavares takes a surprise and in the middle of the shooting, Dante is wounded and deceived.
8	"Dante libre por 24 horas"	Alfonso Pineda Ulloa & Mariano Ardanaz	4 October 2018	1.26
Peniche gives Dante permission to be absent and manages to get a passport, money and a weapon. He goes over the border and looks for Morris. He gets a call from his son, Pablito.
9	"Frida tras el caso de Pablito"	Alfonso Pineda Ulloa & Mariano Ardanaz	5 October 2018	1.10
Although Dante asks her not to call the police, Frida takes a risk and makes contact with an agent, brother of an inmate, telling him that he is a child who lost the couple who took care of him.
10	"Frida descubre quién es Dante"	Alfonso Pineda Ulloa & Mariano Ardanaz	8 October 2018	1.28
When trying to find Pablito's location, Frida discovers Dante's entire history as a former soldier and his rescue mission at La Rotunda, in which he was betrayed and she confronts him.
11	"Linda, la espía de Dante"	Alfonso Pineda Ulloa	9 October 2018	1.32
After Frida visits Linda in Texas, Judge Morris's daughter goes to the prison, in disguise, to help Dante find his son. Santito's father is killed. Tavares swears revenge.
12	"Dante y Frida se besan"	Alfonso Pineda Ulloa	10 October 2018	1.35
After making the decision to return to the US where Dante Pardo does not exist, nor has problems with the law, Lázaro kisses Frida and invites her to leave with him. Linda and Frida go for Pablito.
13	"Dante sale de la prisión"	Alfonso Pineda Ulloa & Jorge Colón	11 October 2018	1.42
In the middle of the chaos, deceiving the authorities and wearing the uniform of a fireman, Dante leaves the penitentiary by the main door of La Rotunda and is released. He says goodbye to Frida.

== Awards and nominations ==
Year	Award	Category	Nominated	Result
2019	International Emmy Award	Best Non-English Language U.S. Primetime Program	El recluso	Nominated
