= Amapola (film) =

- Original film poster in Spanish
- Directed by: Eugenio Zanetti
- Written by: Eugenio Zanetti
- Produced by: Gonzalo Vila; Daniel Benadon; Rodrigo Vila; Dalila Zaritzky; Guillermo Rossi; Sabina Sigler; Raúl Campos
- Starring: Camilla Belle; François Arnaud; Geraldine Chaplin; Lito Cruz; Elena Roger
- Cinematography: Ueli Steiger
- Edited by: Jane Moran; Santos César Custodio
- Music by: Emilio Kauderer
- Production company: Cinema 7 Films
- Distributed by: 20th Century Fox
- Release date: June 5, 2014 (Argentina)
- Running time: 84 minutes
- Countries: Argentina; United States
- Languages: Spanish; English

Amapola is a 2014 Argentine-American romantic comedy fantasy film written and directed by Eugenio Zanetti and starring Camilla Belle, François Arnaud, Lito Cruz, Leonor Benedetto and Geraldine Chaplin. It is the first film as a director of Zanetti, who was previously known for his work in art direction, as well as set designer and theater/opera director.

== Synopsis ==
During the turbulent years that changed Argentina - between 1966's Coup d'état and its subsequent dictatorship, the Malvinas/Falklands War in 1982 and the return to democracy in 1983 - a young woman who lives with a family of artists is magically transported to the future, where she discovers the decadence that fell upon her family, their estate and herself. She decides to return to her present in an effort to change the future, keep her family united, save her happiness and find her true love.

== Cast ==
- Camilla Belle as Amapola
- François Arnaud as Luke
- Geraldine Chaplin as Memé
- Lito Cruz as Amapola's father
- Leonor Benedetto as Clara
- Esmeralda Mitre as Sisy
- Elena Roger
- Nicolás Pauls as Ariel
- Luciano Cáceres as Tincho
- Nicolás Scarpino as Lalo
- Liz Solari as Lola
- Juan Luppi as Juan
- Santiago Caamaño as Gáston
- Juan Acosta as Saporitti

== Production ==
Amapola was for a long time a dream project for Argentine Eugenio Zanetti, who gained international recognition for his work in many Hollywood films such as Flatliners (1990), Last Action Hero (1993), What Dreams May Come (1998) and The Haunting (1999), and won an Academy Award for Best Art Direction in 1995 for the film Restoration. Zanetti also participated as the film's production designer.

Camilla Belle took some time before filming for learning to speak Castilian, a variant of the Spanish language and Argentina's official language (as well as the most popularly talked in the country), and to do so with a "Porteño" (people from Buenos Aires City) accent.

== Reception ==
Released in Argentina on June 5, 2014, the film received mixed reviews from Argentinian critics.

== See also ==
- Time travel in fiction
