= On Heroes and Tombs =

1961 novel by Ernesto Sabato

- First edition
- Author: Ernesto Sabato
- Original title: Sobre Héroes y Tumbas
- Translator: Helen R. Lane
- Language: Spanish
- Publisher: Compañía General Fabril Editora
- Publication date: 1961
- Publication place: Argentina
- Media type: Print (Paperback)

On Heroes and Tombs (Spanish: Sobre héroes y tumbas) is a novel by Argentine writer Ernesto Sabato (1911–2011), first published in Buenos Aires in 1961. In 1981, Fitzhenry & Whiteside published an English-language edition, translated by Helen R. Lane.

== Plot summary ==
Nineteen-year-old Martín Castillo is a boy from Buenos Aires trying to find his path in life. He meets and falls in love with Alejandra Vidal Olmos, who with her father Fernando represents the "old", post-colonial and autochthonous Argentina, which is seen mutating amid a strange and unsettling "new" world. The novel gives an evocative portrait of the city of Buenos Aires and its people.

== Characters ==
Primary characters in the novel include:

- Martín del Castillo: the novel's protagonist
- Alejandra Vidal Olmos: Martín's love interest
- Fernando Vidal Olmos: Alejandra's father
- Bruno Bassan: a writer who provides Martín insights
- Uncle Bebe: Alejandra's uncle
- Grandfather Pancho: Alejandra's grandfather
- Aunt Escolatica: Alejandra's aunt

== Reception ==
Reactions to On Heroes and Tombs were fairly positive. Desson Howee of the Washington Post said that Sabato, “took his place among Latin America’s greatest writers, and he followed a singular literary path that distinguished him from the writers of the Latin American ‘boom’ of the 1960s and 1970s.” Fellow authors also gave praise to the novel. Salman Rushdie said the book, “offers by way of fair exchange a rich motherlode of imagery, language and haunting scenes.” In 1972, the Chilean poet Pablo Neruda listed Sabato among the greatest Latin American writers, saying he displayed, "greater vitality and imagination than anything since the great [19th century] Russian novels."

The New York Times described Sabato as a writer who "...wants literature that is ''naked'' and profound, ''created with blood,'' concerned with universal metaphysical themes and the ''extreme existential situations of solitude and death.'' Overall, "On Heroes and Tombs" presents a profound inquiry into the mysteries of human life, engaging with its darker aspects while hinting at the potential for understanding and connection.

Kirkus Reviews gave a negative review on the book, calling it, "chalky in texture, simpler than it seems while straining toward a very opposite impression, and more than a little droning," has aged poorly over the years into something, "cumbersome and hollow."

== References to actual history, geography and current science ==
Interspersed with the text of On Heroes and Tombs, as an almost surrealistic running commentary on it, is the italicised narrative of the flight, killing and ensuing odyssey of Juan Lavalle, a classic Argentine subject.

== Adaptions ==
John Malkovich has optioned the film rights for On Heroes and Tombs.

Swedish melodic death metal band At the Gates' album At War with Reality has lyrics based on the novel. Its intro is a quote from this book.
