= The Truce (1974 film) =

1974 film

- Theatrical release poster
- Directed by: Sergio Renán
- Written by: Aída Bortnik; Sergio Renán
- Based on: The Truce by Mario Benedetti
- Produced by: Rene Aure; Tita Tamames; Rosa Zemborain
- Starring: Héctor Alterio; Luis Brandoni; Ana María Picchio; Marilina Ross
- Cinematography: Juan Carlos Desanzo
- Edited by: Óscar Souto
- Music by: Julián Plaza
- Release date: August 1, 1974
- Running time: 108 minutes
- Country: Argentina
- Language: Spanish

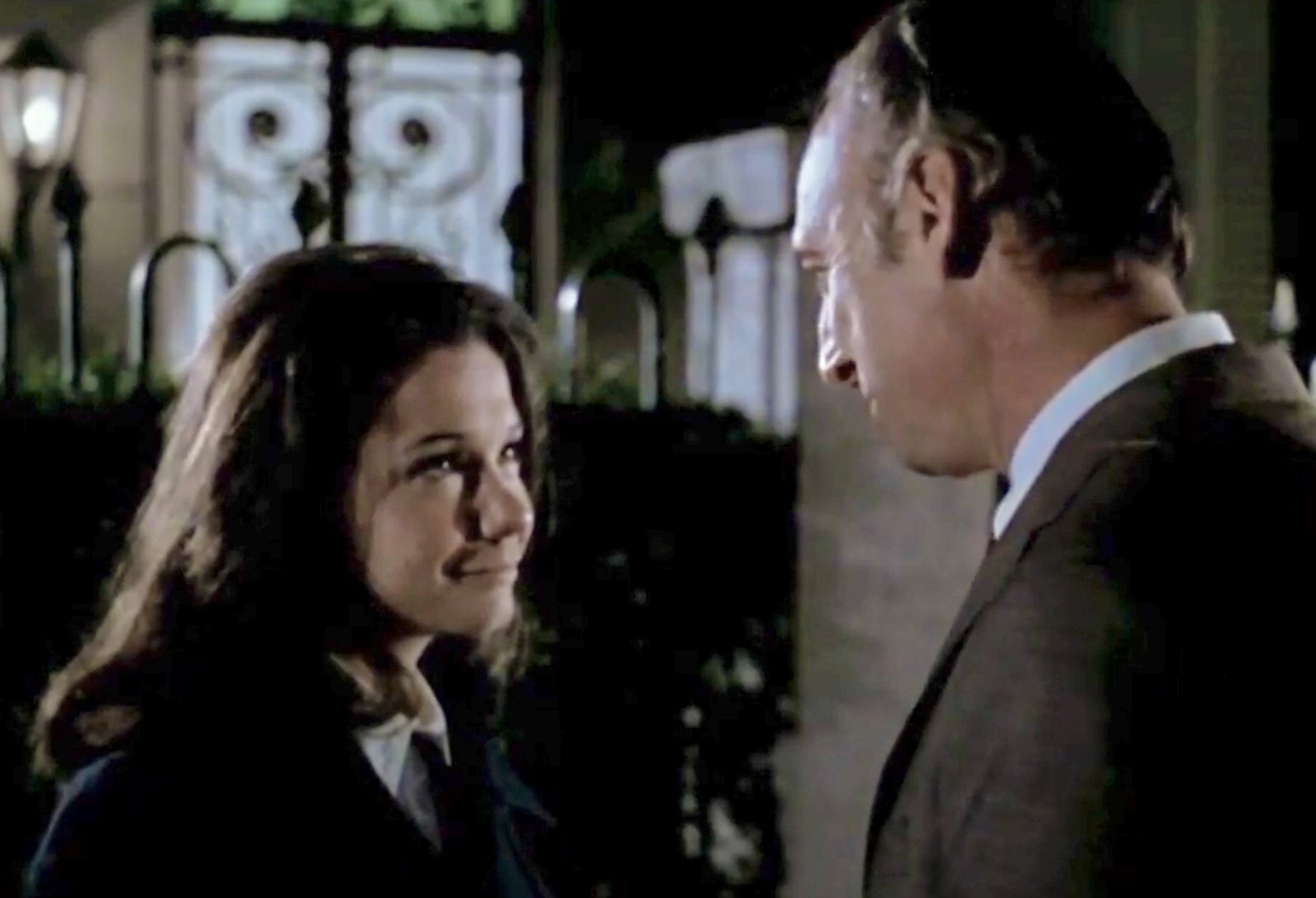
La tregua, Ana María Picchio, Héctor Alterio

The Truce (Spanish: La tregua) is a 1974 Argentine romantic drama film directed by Sergio Renán and based on the 1960 novel of the same name by Mario Benedetti. It was the first Argentine film to be nominated for an Academy Award (the Academy Award for Best Foreign Language Film).

It was selected as the eighth greatest Argentine film of all time in a poll conducted by the Museo del Cine Pablo Ducrós Hicken in 1984, while it ranked 6th in the 2000 edition. In a new version of the survey organized in 2022 by the specialized magazines La vida util, Taipei and La tierra quema, presented at the Mar del Plata International Film Festival, the film reached the 27 position.

== Plot ==
The film opens on Martín Santomé's (Héctor Alterio) 49th birthday, a widower and the father of three children: the eldest, the embittered Esteban (Luis Brandoni); the caring middle-child Blanca (Marilina Ross) and Jaime (Oscar Martínez), a closeted homosexual. He goes to work thinking they have forgotten his birthday, and once at the office, he assigns two new employees to their jobs: the effeminate, nervous Santini (Antonio Gasalla) and the young Laura (Ana María Picchio), with whom he soon develops a bond. Back home, Martín is surprised with a party thrown by his children.

After having a one-night stand with a woman he met on the bus (Norma Aleandro), Martín starts going through a series of events that alter his life completely. Santini has a nervous breakdown at work and rants against the complacency of his co-workers; he is subsequently replaced, though the breakdown marks Martín and forces him to look at his own life. His son Jaime finally comes out and decides to leave home to save the family from embarrassment and further complications. Topping it all, Martín, who has befriended Laura, professes his love for her at a café and implores her to look beyond the age difference (he is 49, she is 24) and give him a chance. She accepts.

The two start dating and Martín regains his wont of living. Their relationship never falters, and hints of infidelity are quickly dismissed. He moves into her apartment, forsaking his son and daughter (who starts dating a man herself). This upsets Esteban even more, who blames his father for giving him a mediocre life. Martín implores him that it is never late to change, and they reconcile.

The film's climax begins with the untimely demise of Laura, who contracts flu and dies from heart failure shortly thereafter. Martín once again regains his bleak view of life and the world. He realizes that his romance with Laura was nothing but "a truce with life". The film ends on an ambiguous tone, as Esteban tries to comfort his father, roles inverted, and the camera centers on Martín, leaning against the wall, looking more hopeless than ever.

== Cast ==
- Héctor Alterio .... Martín Santomé
- Luis Brandoni .... Esteban Santomé
- Ana María Picchio .... Laura Avellaneda
- Marilina Ross .... Blanca Santomé
- Oscar Martínez .... Jaime Santomé
- Cipe Lincovsky .... Laura's mother
- Lautaro Murúa .... The Manager
- Norma Aleandro .... Woman on the bus
- Sergio Renán ... Jaime's friend
- Antonio Gasalla .... Santini
- Luis Politti .... Vignale
- Jorge Sassi .... Suárez

== Background ==
Argentine actor Sergio Renán had been performing in films since 1951 under the direction of noted filmmakers Mario Soffici, Lucas Demare and three times under Leopoldo Torre Nilsson. It was in his last collaboration with Torre Nilsson, in 1973, that he met fellow co-stars Héctor Alterio and Norma Aleandro. A year later he would cast them both in a starring role and a cameo appearance respectively in his film debut, La tregua.

A year after its release, La tregua was submitted to the Academy Awards (the Academy Award for Best Foreign Language Film) and won a nomination (the first Academy Award nomination in Argentine film history) but lost out to Federico Fellini's Amarcord. The film has since gained cult status in Argentina. A Mexican remake was made in 2003.

== See also ==
- List of submissions to the 47th Academy Awards for Best Foreign Language Film
- List of Argentine submissions for the Academy Award for Best Foreign Language Film
