= Amongst Men =

2021 Argentine television series

- Spanish: Entre hombres
- Genre: Crime
- Based on: Entre hombres by Germán Maggiori
- Written by: Germán Maggiori; Pablo Fendrik
- Directed by: Pablo Fendrik
- Starring: Gabriel Goity; Nicolás Furtado; Diego Velázquez; Diego Cremonesi; Claudio Rissi
- Composers: Cachorro López; Juan Blas Caballero
- Country of origin: Argentina
- Original language: Spanish
- No. of seasons: 1
- No. of episodes: 4

Production
- Cinematography: Daniel Ortega
- Running time: 60 minutes
- Production companies: HBO Latin America; Pol-ka Producciones

Original release
- Network: HBO Max
- Release: 26 September 2021

Amongst Men (Spanish: Entre hombres) is a four-part Argentine crime thriller television miniseries based on the eponymous novel by Germán Maggiori. It was released on HBO Max on 26 September 2021.

== Premise ==
The fiction is set in the fringes of the Province of Buenos Aires towards 1996. In the wake of the death of a woman during an orgy because of overdose, the VHS recording the party becomes a macguffin in the plot, which explores the Argentine criminal gangs and their relation with the police.

== Cast ==
- Gabriel Goity as Sargento Garmendia
- Nicolás Furtado as Mosca.
- Diego Velázquez as Inspector Almada.
- Diego Cremonesi as Zurdo.
- Claudio Rissi as Tucumano.
- César Troncoso
- Norman Briski
- Luis Machín as senador Achabala
- Pompeyo Audivert
- Roly Serrano

== Production and release ==
The series is based on the novel of the same name by Germán Maggiori, first published in 2001. Produced by HBO Latin America and Pol-ka Producciones, shooting began in June 2019. Pablo Fendrik directed the episodes. The score was composed by Cachorro López and Juan Blas Caballero. The series was pre-screened on 2 March 2021 at the 71st Berlin International Film Festival. Consisting of four parts featuring a runtime of about an hour each, Amongst Men debuted on HBO Max on 26 September 2021.
