= Carlos Ameglio =

Uruguayan film director

Carlos Ameglio (born 23 June 1965 in Montevideo) is an Uruguayan film director.

His film La cáscara was distinguished as the best film at the AFIA Film Festival in Aarhus.

Currently he is working on the Kiken project with Diego Dubcovsky.

== Filmography ==
- Los últimos vermicelli (1987, with Diego Arsuaga)
- Psiconautas
- La cáscara
- El hombre de Walter
- Porn for Newbies (2018)
