= Mario Sábato =

Argentine film director and screenwriter (1945–2023)

Mario Sabato
- Born: 15 February 1945; Buenos Aires, Argentina
- Died: 3 June 2023 (aged 78); Buenos Aires, Argentina
- Occupations: Film director, screenwriter
- Father: Ernesto Sabato

Mario Sabato (15 February 1945 – 3 June 2023) was an Argentine film director and screenwriter. He was the son of the famed writer Ernesto Sabato.

Sabato worked mainly in the Cinema of Argentina and was best known for his children's comedy films.

Sabato died in Buenos Aires on 3 June 2023, at the age of 78.

== Filmography ==
- Y que patatín...y que patatán (1971)
- ¡Hola Señor León! (1973)
- Los golpes bajos (1974)
- Un mundo de amor (1975)
- Los superagentes biónicos (1977)
- Los superagentes y el tesoro maldito (1978)
- El poder de las tinieblas (1979)
- Tiro al aire (1980)
- Los Parchís contra el inventor invisible (1981)
- La magia de Los Parchís (1982)
- Las aventuras de los Parchís (1982)
- Superagentes y titanes (1983)
- Al corazón (1995)
- India Pravile (2003)
- Ernesto Sabato, mi padre (documentary, 2010)
