= Rodolfo Brindisi =

Argentine actor

- Born: 1932; Mar del Plata, Argentina
- Died: 2009
- Years active: 1970 - 2003

Rodolfo Brindisi (1932-2009) was an Argentine actor who appeared in film and television in Argentina between 1970 and 2003.

In 1971 he appeared in the musical Balada para un mochilero directed by Carlos Rinaldi, which starred José Marrone.
