= Sergio Renán =

Argentine actor, film director, and screenwriter

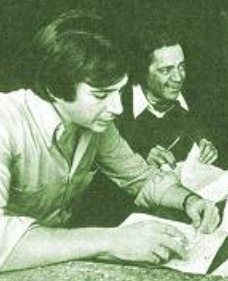
- Sergio Renán (left)
- Born: Samuel Kohan; 30 January 1933; Buenos Aires
- Died: 13 June 2015 (aged 82); Buenos Aires
- Occupations: Film director Screenwriter; Actor
- Years active: 1951 – 2007

Sergio Renán (30 January 1933 – 13 June 2015) was an Argentine actor, film director, and screenwriter.

== Biography ==
Born Samuel Kohan in Buenos Aires in 1933, his parents were Jewish immigrants who had lived in one of the numerous Jewish agricultural colonies in Entre Ríos Province. Renán became an accomplished violinist in his teens and, following a minor film role in Mario Soffici's 1951 drama Pasó en mi barrio (It Happened in My Neighborhood), he joined the theatre as an actor and continued to appear in supporting roles in Argentine cinema. His directorial debut came on the stage in 1970 with his production of Jean Genet's The Maids. Following a number of prominent film roles for directors Leopoldo Torre Nilsson and Manuel Antín, Renán's film script for Mario Benedetti's novel, The Truce, was produced in 1974. Starring Héctor Alterio and Ana Maria Picchio, the May–December romance was nominated for the Academy Award for Best Foreign Language Film, the first Argentine film so honored.

This success was followed by another adaptation of a novel, Crecer de golpe (Growing Up Suddenly, 1976), based on Haroldo Conti's coming-of-age tale. At odds with the right-wing dictatorship installed in 1976, Renán nevertheless directed a propaganda film, La fiesta de todos, on the 1978 FIFA World Cup (played in and won by Argentina). In 1979 he starred as the main character in El Poder de las tinieblas, a dark film with political undertones, telling the story of a man ( Renán) who has discovered a global conspiracy against blind people. Then, in 1980, he directed and took the lead role in Sentimental, and received his first Konex Award (the highest in the Argentine cultural realm), the following year. The film was also entered into the 12th Moscow International Film Festival.

He starred as himself in Eduardo Calcagno's psychological thriller, Los enemigos (The Enemies, 1983), and adapted another Benedetti novel, Gracias por el fuego (Thanks for the Fire), for the screen in 1984. Following elections in 1983, however, his career declined somewhat, and he mainly directed for the theatre and television in subsequent years. Renán numerous operatic productions during this period at the renowned Colón Theatre included Manon (1984), Rigoletto (1985), Othello (1987), Madame Butterfly (1989), Così fan tutte (1990), and The Marriage of Figaro (1991–92); he also made his experience as a violinist amenable as part the Konex Foundation's classical music jury in 1989, and in 1995, he was appointed music director of the Colón Theatre.

He was reunited with Eduardo Calcagno in a supporting, semi-autobiographical role as a director struggling with official interference in Calcagno's surreal, 1995 tragedy, El censor. Replaced in his post at the helm of the Colón following elections in 1999, a strike at the opera house helped result in his temporary reinstatement in 2000. Returning to film and theatre in 2001, he produced French playwright Eric-Emmanuel Schmitt's Enigma Variations, and adapted Spanish writer Juan José Millás' La soledad era esto (This Was Solitude) for a 2002 film release.

He returned to film in 2007 as co-screenwriter and director of Juan José Saer's erotic thriller, Tres de corazones (Three of Hearts). Renán died in Buenos Aires in 2015; he was 82.
