= Mario Mactas =

Argentinian journalist and writer (1944–2025)

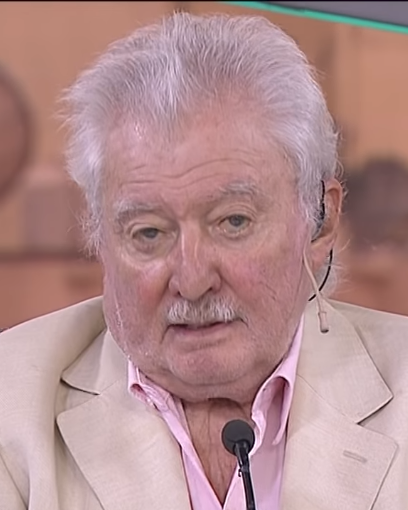
- Born: 13 August 1944; Carlos Casares, Buenos Aires Province, Argentina
- Died: 12 July 2025 (aged 80); Rafael Castillo, Buenos Aires Province, Argentina
- Occupations: Journalist, broadcaster, television presenter, writer

Mario Fernando Mactas (Spanish: [ˈmaɾjo feɾˈnando ˈmaktas]; 13 August 1944 – 12 July 2025) was an Argentine journalist and writer.

== Life and career ==
Mactas was born in Carlos Casares, a small town in the humid pampas of the province of Buenos Aires. He studied at the Colegio Nacional de Buenos Aires and then enrolled at the University of Buenos Aires, where he studied medicine and philosophy.

He never graduated. Thereafter, he dedicated himself to graphic journalism, radio, and literature. He also dabbled in screenwriting. He participated in the founding of the magazines Gente and Satiricón and had his first radio job at Radio Continental.

For political and work reasons, he lived in Colombia and France and went into exile in Sitges, Spain, where he edited the weekly Gaceta ilustrada and was intensely active in radio and cultural venues. He held Spanish nationality.

On 12 July 2025, he died from pneumonia after being hospitalized at Favaloro Hospital. He was 80. Mactas had already suffered from lung health problems, aggravated by having contracted COVID-19 in his last years.
