= Ernesto Sabato =

Argentine writer and physicist (1911–2011)

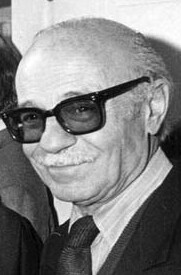
- Born: June 24, 1911; Rojas, Buenos Aires Province, Argentina
- Died: April 30, 2011 (aged 99); Santos Lugares, Buenos Aires Province, Argentina
- Education: Universidad Nacional de La Pampa (PhD, 1938)
- Occupations: Novelist and essayist, painter
- Spouse: Matilde Kusminsky Richter (1936–1998)
- Children: 2, including Mario
- Writing career
- Language: Spanish
- Period: 1941–2004
- Genres: Novel, essay
- Notable works: El Túnel; Sobre héroes y tumbas Abaddón el exterminador
- Notable awards: Legion of Honour; Prix du Meilleur Livre Étranger; Miguel de Cervantes Prize; Jerusalem Prize

Signature
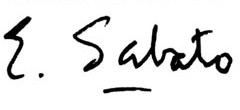

Ernesto Sabato (Spanish: [ˈsaβaðo]; June 24, 1911 – April 30, 2011) was an Argentine novelist, essayist, painter and physicist. According to the BBC he "won some of the most prestigious prizes in Hispanic literature" and "became very influential in the literary world throughout Latin America". Upon his death El País dubbed him the "last classic writer in Argentine literature".

Sabato was known for his bald pate head and brush-style moustache, and was often seen wearing tinted glasses and open-necked shirts. He was born in Rojas, a small town in Buenos Aires Province. Sabato began his studies at the Colegio Nacional de La Plata. He then studied physics at the Universidad Nacional de La Plata, where he earned a PhD. He then attended the Sorbonne in Paris and worked at the Curie Institute. After World War II, he lost interest in science and started writing.

Sabato's oeuvre includes three novels: El Túnel (1948), Sobre héroes y tumbas (1961) and Abaddón el exterminador (1974). The first of these received critical acclaim upon its publication from, among others, fellow writers Albert Camus and Thomas Mann. The second is regarded as his masterpiece, though he nearly burnt it like many of his other works. Sabato's essays cover topics as diverse as metaphysics, politics and tango. His writings led him to receive many international prizes, including the Miguel de Cervantes Prize (Spain), the Legion of Honour (France), the Jerusalem Prize (Israel), and the Prix du Meilleur Livre Étranger (France).

At the request of President Raúl Alfonsín, he presided over the CONADEP Commission that investigated the fate of those who suffered forced disappearance during the Dirty War of the 1970s. The result of these findings was published in 1984, bearing the title Nunca Más (Never Again).

== Biography ==
=== Early years ===
Ernesto Sabato was born in Rojas, Buenos Aires Province, son of Francesco Sabato and Giovanna Maria Ferrari, Italian immigrants from Calabria. His father was from Fuscaldo, and his mother was an Arbëreshë (Albanian minority in Italy) from San Martino di Finita. He was the tenth of a total of 11 children. Being born after his ninth brother's death, he carried on his name "Ernesto".

In 1924 he finished primary school in Rojas and settled in the city of La Plata for his secondary education at the Colegio Nacional de La Plata. There he met professor Pedro Henríquez Ureña, an early inspiration for his writing career. In 1929 he started college, attending the School of Physics and Mathematics at the Universidad Nacional de La Plata.

He was an active member in the Reforma Universitaria movement, founding "Insurrexit Group" in 1933 – of communist ideals – together with Héctor P. Agosti, Ángel Hurtado de Mendoza and Paulino González Alberdi, among others.

In 1933 he was elected Secretario General of the Federación Juvenil Comunista (Communist Youth Federation). While attending a lecture about Marxism he met Matilde Kusminsky Richter, aged 17, who would leave her parents' house to live with Sabato.

In 1934 he started to doubt Communism and Joseph Stalin's regime. The Communist Party of Argentina, which had noted this, sent him to the International Lenin School for two years. According to Sabato, "it was a place where either you recovered or ended up in a gulag or psychiatric hospital". Before arriving at Moscow, he traveled to Brussels as a delegate from the Communist Party of Argentina at the "Congress against Fascism and the War". Once there, fearing not coming back from Moscow, he left the congress to escape to Paris. It was there where he wrote his first novel: La Fuente Muda, which remains unpublished. Once back in Buenos Aires, in 1936, he married Matilde Kusminsky Richter.

=== His years as a scientist ===
In 1938 he obtained his PhD in physics from the Universidad Nacional de La Plata. Thanks to Bernardo Houssay, he was granted a research fellowship in atomic radiation at the Curie Institute in Paris. On May 25, 1938 Jorge Federico Sabato, his first son, was born. While in France he made contact with the surrealist movement, studying the works of Oscar Domínguez, Benjamin Péret, Roberto Matta Echaurren and Esteban Francés among others. This would have a deep influence on his future writing.

During that time of antagonisms, I buried myself with electrometers and graduated cylinders during the morning and spent the nights in bars, with the delirious surrealists. At the Dome and in the Deux Magots, inebriated with those heralds of chaos and excess, we used to spend many hours creating exquisite cadavers.

— Ernesto Sabato.

On March 18, 1939 he left France, sailing from Cherbourg aboard the Queen Mary. At the Massachusetts Institute of Technology he collaborated with Manuel Sandoval Vallarta. By July 7, 1939 he had returned to Argentina intent on leaving physics behind. However, serving an obligation to those responsible for his fellowship Sabato started teaching at the Universidad de La Plata for Engineering admission, and relativity and quantum mechanics for post graduate degrees. In 1943, due to an "existential crisis", he left science for good to become a full-time writer and painter.

At the Curie Institute, one of the highest goals for a physicist, I found myself empty. Beaten up by disbelief, I kept going because of inertia, which my soul rejected.

— Ernesto Sabato

In 1945, his second son, Mario Sabato was born.

=== Writing career ===
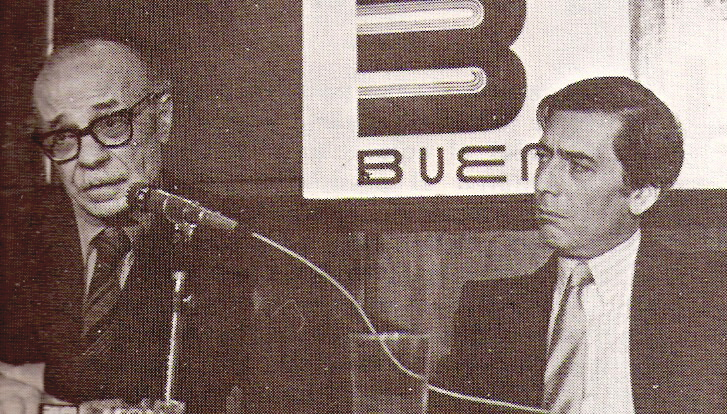
Ernesto Sabato with Peruvian writer Mario Vargas Llosa in 1981

In 1941, Sabato published his first literary work, an article about La invención de Morel by Adolfo Bioy Casares, in the magazine Teseo from La Plata. Also, in concert with Pedro Henríquez Ureña, he published a collaboration in the renowned Sur magazine.

In 1942, working for Sur magazine reviewing books, he was put in charge of the "Calendario" section and participated in "Desagravio a Borges" in Sur nº 94. He also published articles in La Nación and a translation of The Birth and Death of the Sun by George Gamow. The following year he published a translation of The ABC of Relativity by Bertrand Russell.

In 1945, his first book, Uno y el Universo, a series of essays criticizing the apparent moral neutrality of science and warning about dehumanization processes in technological societies, was published; with time he would turn towards a libertarian and humanist standing. That same year he was awarded a prize by the municipality of Buenos Aires for his book and the honor wand of the Sociedad Argentina de Escritores.

In 1948, after being rejected by several Buenos Aires editors, Sabato published in Sur his first novel, El túnel, a psychological novel narrated in the first person. Framed in existentialism, it was met with enthusiastic reviews by Albert Camus, who had Gallimard publish a French translation. It has been further translated to more than 10 languages. Others who enjoyed the book included Thomas Mann.

France's literary industry named Sabato's book Abaddon, el Exterminador (The Angel of Darkness) the best foreign book of 1976.

His eldest son Jorge died at the age of 56 on 10 February 1995 in a car accident. In 1998, Sabato's wife died.

In 1999 he acquired Italian citizenship in addition to his original Argentine nationality.

Sabato died in Santos Lugares on April 30, 2011, two months short of his 100th birthday. His death was the result of bronchitis, according to his companion and collaborator Elvira González Fraga. The Spanish newspaper El Mundo said he had been "the last surviving Argentine writer with a capital W".

== Political activism and ideology ==
In his youth, Sabato was an activist in the Communist Party of Argentina, where he became general secretary of the Communist Youth Federation. In this regard, as he recounted in his interview with the Spanish journalist Joaquín Soler Serrano on the television program A fondo (1977), he became disillusioned with the policies of Joseph Stalin while representing the Argentine communist youth at a congress of young communists in Paris in the years prior to World War II. He subsequently distanced himself from Marxist communism, disillusioned by the course taken by Stalin's dictatorship in the Soviet Union.

A critic of Peronism, Sabato was one of the first to provide an interpretation of the government of General Juan Domingo Perón after the overthrow of his second government, which appeared under the title El otro rostro del peronismo in 1956. In this essay, Sabato harshly criticized Peronism:

The motor of history is resentment, which—in the Argentine case—has accumulated from the Indian, the gaucho, the gringo, the immigrant, and the modern worker, to form the germ of the Peronist, the principal resentful and forgotten one.

— Ernesto Sabato

The then-unknown Colonel Perón, whose star was beginning to rise on the horizon, saw clearly that the era of the masses had arrived for the country. And both his training in Italy, his natural tendency toward fascism, his infallible instinct for demagoguery, his ability to intuit and awaken the worst passions of the masses, his own experience as a socially resentful individual—being an illegitimate child—and therefore his understanding and valuation of resentment as the primary driving force of a great mass movement, and finally his absolute lack of scruples; all enabled him to become not only the leader of the Argentine masses but also their exploiter.

— Ernesto Sabato

Despite his criticisms of the Peronist movement and Juan Domingo Perón, Sabato praised Eva Perón, stating that she was the "true revolutionary". He later refused to reissue El otro rostro del peronismo; and in 1987, when his Complete Works were published, he ensured in the preface that this essay would appear in a new volume of political writings, which has not been published to this day.

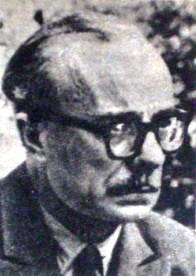
Ernesto Sabato

Regarding the so-called Revolución Libertadora that overthrew Perón in 1955, Sabato wrote in correspondence exchanged with Ernesto Che Guevara:

When, at the time the revolution of 1955 was taking place, I saw modest maidservants silently crying, I thought (at last) that the trees had prevented us from seeing the forest, and that the celebrated texts in which we had read about chemically pure revolutions had prevented us from seeing with our own eyes a dirty revolution (as real historical movements always are) that was developing tumultuously before us.

— Ernesto Sabato
Santos Lugares, 1 February 1960

When General Juan Carlos Onganía overthrew President Arturo Illia, Sabato applauded, stating:

We must have the courage to understand that institutions in which no one seriously believed had come to an end. Do you believe in the Chamber of Deputies?

— Ernesto Sabato in Gente, 28 July 1966

This statement was notable coming from a recognized intellectual, as the Argentine Revolution dictatorship was particularly harsh against writers and scientists, leaving for Argentine memory the Night of the Long Batons, an attack on the University of Buenos Aires that forced dozens of leading academics into exile. Sabato did not comment on this.

During the government of María Estela Martínez de Perón, Sabato felt threatened by the Argentine Anticommunist Alliance. Nevertheless, he was not intimidated and published the essay Nuestro tiempo del desprecio, as well as articles abroad denouncing repression. According to Ángela Dellepiane in research for UNESCO, the newspapers La Razón (Argentina) (20 May 1976) and La Opinión (Buenos Aires) (21 May, directed by Jacobo Timerman) recorded his testimony: "There is something else that distresses me and that I felt obliged to raise: the witch-hunt." Referring to cases such as Antonio Di Benedetto and architect Jorge Hardoy, Sabato stated: "...I named people who honor the country and who have suffered expulsion from their workplaces and even detention."

=== Complicity with the dictatorship of 1976–1983 ===
On 19 May 1976, dictator Jorge Rafael Videla hosted a luncheon with a group of Argentine intellectuals, including Sabato, Jorge Luis Borges, Horacio Esteban Ratti, and priest Leonardo Castellani. Of all present, only Castellani referred to the disappearance of Haroldo Conti and asked about his situation. After the meal, Sabato stated:

It is impossible to summarize a two-hour conversation in a few words, but I can say that with the president of the nation we spoke about culture in general, spiritual, cultural, historical topics, and issues related to mass media. [...] There was a very high degree of understanding and mutual respect. At no time did the dialogue descend into literary or ideological polemics. Nor did we fall into the sin of banality. Each of us expressed, without hesitation, our personal conception of the topics discussed. [...] General Videla made an excellent impression on me. He is a cultured, modest and intelligent man.

— Ernesto Sabato

Writer Osvaldo Bayer later argued that Sabato attempted to justify this meeting as concern for disappeared colleagues, a version denied by others.

This episode drew criticism, including from Bayer, who accused Sabato of "forming part of Argentine hypocrisy".

In 1979, Sabato published Apologías y rechazos, challenging censorship. On 12 August 1980, he was among 175 signatories in Clarín (newspaper) demanding information on the disappeared during the National Reorganization Process.

=== CONADEP ===
After the dictatorship, Sabato chaired the National Commission on the Disappearance of Persons (CONADEP), which investigated human rights violations in Argentina between 1976 and 1983. The findings were compiled in Nunca Más, documenting disappearances, torture, and killings.

On 20 September 1984, Sabato presented the report to President Raúl Alfonsín. Human rights organizations organized a demonstration of approximately 70,000 people in support.

The report reflected the theory of the two demons:

During the 1970s Argentina was convulsed by a terror that came from both the far-right and the far-left [...] the Armed Forces responded with infinitely worse terrorism.

— Ernesto Sabato

The report contributed to the Trial of the Juntas. Sabato later condemned pardons granted in 1989.

=== Later years ===
In his later writings, Sabato described himself as adhering to Christian anarchism.

I am an anarchist... anarchists have been great spirits such as Leo Tolstoy.

— Ernesto Sabato

Although I was a communist activist, anarchism has always seemed to me a path toward social justice with full freedom.

— Ernesto Sabato

== Works ==
=== Novels ===
- 1948: El túnel (Translated by Harriet de Onis in 1950 as The Outsider and again by Margaret Sayers Peden in 1988 as The Tunnel)
- 1961: Sobre héroes y tumbas (Translated by Helen R. Lane in 1981 as On Heroes and Tombs)
- 1974: Abaddón el exterminador (Translated by Andrew Hurley in 1991 as The Angel of Darkness)

=== Essays ===
- 1945: El concepto de temperatura en la termodinámica fenomenológica (The concept of temperature in phenomenological thermodynamics). Article in Revista de la Unión Matemática Argentina, Vol. X, N° 4 https://cai.org.ar/documento-cientifico-de-ernesto-sabato-en-la-biblioteca-del-cai/
- 1945: Uno y el Universo (One and the Universe)
- 1951: Hombres y engranajes (Man and Mechanism)
- 1953: Heterodoxia (Heterodoxy)
- 1956: El caso Sabato. Torturas y libertad de prensa. Carta abierta al General Aramburu (The Sabato Case. Tortures and Liberty of Press. Open Letter to General Aramburu)
- 1956: El otro rostro del peronismo (The Other Face of Peronism)
- 1963: El escritor y sus fantasmas (Translated by Asa Zatz in 1990 as The Writer in the Catastrophe of our Time.)
- 1963: Tango, discusión y clave (Tango: Discussion and Key)
- 1967: Significado de Pedro Henríquez Ureña (Significance of Pedro Henríquez Ureña)
- 1968: Tres aproximaciones a la literatura de nuestro tiempo: Robbe-Grillet, Borges, Sartre (Three Approximations to the Literature of our Time: Robbe-Grillet, Borges, Sartre)
- 1973: La cultura en la encrucijada nacional (Culture in the National Crossroads)
- 1976: Diálogos con Jorge Luis Borges (Dialogues with Jorge Luis Borges) (Edited by Orlando Barone)
- 1979: Apologías y rechazos (Apologies and Rebuttals)
- 1979: Los libros y su misión en la liberación e integración de la América Latina (Books and their Mission in the Liberation and Integration of Latin America)
- 1988: Entre la letra y la sangre. Conversaciones con Carlos Catania (Between Letter and Blood. Conversations with Carlos Catania)
- 1998: Antes del fin (Before the End)

Antes del fin is an autobiography in which he recounts his life and the influences on his political and ethical opinions. Sabato discusses the ill effects of globalization and the exalting of rationalism and materialism. There are also several tender passages about his school experiences in the 1920s (when there was more idealism, Sabato says), about his deceased wife and son, Matilde and Jorge, and about the struggling workers he meets on the streets of Buenos Aires.

- 2000: La resistencia (The Resistance)
- 2004: España en los diarios de mi vejez (Spain in the Diaries of my Old Age)

=== Others ===
- 1964: Itinerario (Itinerary)
- 1966: Romance de la muerte de Juan Lavalle. Cantar de Gesta (Romance of Juan Lavalle's Death. Cantar de gesta)
- 1984: Nunca más. Informe de la Comisión Nacional sobre la desaparición de personas (Never Again. Report from the National Commission on the Disappearance of Persons)

== Tribute ==
On 24 June 2019, on Sabato's 108th birthday, he was honored with a Google Doodle.

== See also ==
- Argentine literature
