= Aldo Barbero =

Argentine actor

- Born: 13 February 1937; Santa Fe, Argentina
- Died: 27 October 2013 (aged 76); Buenos Aires, Argentina
- Occupation: Actor
- Years active: 1963–2013

Aldo Barbero (13 February 1937 – 27 October 2013) was an Argentine actor who made over 65 appearances in film and TV in Argentine since the early 1960s.

In 1971, he appeared in the musical Balada para un mochilero directed by Carlos Rinaldi, which starred Jose Marrone.

In 1977, he starred in La Aventura explosiva, a film which co-starred Víctor Bó.

== Filmography ==
- The Curious Dr. Humpp (1969)
- What's Autumn? (1977)
- The Island (1979)
