= List of number-one hits of 1963 (Mexico) =

This is a list of the songs that reached number one in Mexico in 1963, according to Billboard magazine with data provided by Audiomusica.

== Chart History ==
Issue date	Song	Artist(s)	Ref.
January 19	"El ladrón"	Sonora Santanera	
January 26	"El ladrón"	Sonora Santanera	
February 2	"El ladrón"	Sonora Santanera	
February 9	"El ladrón"	Sonora Santanera	
February 16	"El ladrón"	Sonora Santanera	
February 23	"El ladrón"	Sonora Santanera	
March 2	"El ladrón"	Sonora Santanera	
March 9	"Al di là"	Emilio Pericoli	
March 16	"Al di là"	Emilio Pericoli	
March 23	"Al di là"	Emilio Pericoli	
March 30	"Al di là"	Emilio Pericoli	
April 6	"Al di là"	Emilio Pericoli	
April 13	"Al di là"	Emilio Pericoli	
April 20	"Al di là"	Emilio Pericoli	
April 27	"Al di là"	Emilio Pericoli	
May 4	"Al di là"	Emilio Pericoli	
May 11	"Al di là"	Emilio Pericoli	
May 18	"Llegó borracho el borracho"	José Alfredo Jiménez with Mariachi Vargas de Tecalitlán	
May 25	"Llegó borracho el borracho"	José Alfredo Jiménez with Mariachi Vargas de Tecalitlán	
June 1	"Llegó borracho el borracho"	José Alfredo Jiménez with Mariachi Vargas de Tecalitlán	
June 8	"Llegó borracho el borracho"	José Alfredo Jiménez with Mariachi Vargas de Tecalitlán	
June 15	"Llegó borracho el borracho"	José Alfredo Jiménez with Mariachi Vargas de Tecalitlán	
June 22	"Llegó borracho el borracho"	José Alfredo Jiménez with Mariachi Vargas de Tecalitlán	
June 29	"Llegó borracho el borracho"	José Alfredo Jiménez with Mariachi Vargas de Tecalitlán	
July 6	"Llegó borracho el borracho"	José Alfredo Jiménez with Mariachi Vargas de Tecalitlán	
July 13	"De mil maneras"	Sonora Santanera	
July 20	"De mil maneras"	Sonora Santanera	
July 27	"De mil maneras"	Sonora Santanera	
August 3	"De mil maneras"	Sonora Santanera	
August 10	"Enemigos"	Sonia López	
August 17	"Enemigos"	Sonia López	
August 24	"Enemigos"	Sonia López	
August 31	"Enemigos"	Sonia López	
September 7	"Enemigos"	Sonia López	
September 14	"Enemigos"	Sonia López	
September 21	"Let's Get Together"	Hayley Mills	
September 28	"Let's Get Together"	Hayley Mills	
October 5	"Despeinada"	Los Hooligans / Manolo Muñoz	
October 12	"Despeinada"	Los Hooligans / Manolo Muñoz	
October 19	"Despeinada"	Los Hooligans	
October 26	"Despeinada"	Los Hooligans	
November 2	"Let's Get Together"	Hayley Mills	
November 9	"Let's Get Together"	Hayley Mills	
November 16	"Entrega total"	Javier Solís	
November 23	"Entrega total"	Javier Solís	
November 30	"Magia blanca"	Los Hermanos Carrión	
December 7	"Magia blanca"	Los Hermanos Carrión	
December 14	"Magia blanca"	Los Hermanos Carrión	
December 21	"Magia blanca"	Los Hermanos Carrión	
December 28	"El lechero"	Las Guerrilleras de la Frontera / Los Hermanos Záizar	

=== By country of origin ===
Number-one artists:

Country of origin	Number of artists	Artists
Mexico	9	Sonora Santanera
Mexico	9	José Alfredo Jiménez & Mariachi Vargas de Tecatitlán
Mexico	9	Sonia López
Mexico	9	Los Hooligans
Mexico	9	Manolo Muñoz
Mexico	9	Javier Solís
Mexico	9	Los Hermanos Carrión
Mexico	9	Las Guerrilleras de la Frontera
Mexico	9	Los Hermanos Záizar
Italy	1	Emilio Pericoli
United Kingdom	1	Hayley Mills

Number-one compositions (it denotes the country of origin of the song's composer[s]; in case the song is a cover of another one, the name of the original composition is provided in parentheses):

Country of origin	Number of compositions	Compositions
Mexico	6	"El ladrón"
Mexico	6	"Llegó borracho el borracho"
Mexico	6	"De mil maneras"
Mexico	6	"Enemigos"
Mexico	6	"Entrega total"
Mexico	6	"El lechero"
United States	2	"Let's Get Together"
United States	2	"Magia blanca" ("Devil Woman")
Italy	1	"Al di là"
Argentina	1	"Despeinada"

== See also ==
- 1963 in music

== Sources ==
- Print editions of the Billboard magazine from January 26 to December 28, 1963.
