= Vivir enamorada =

Mexican telenovela

- Genre: Telenovela
- Created by: Nené Cascallar
- Written by: Enrique Moyano; Alfredo Iglesias
- Directed by: Carlos Ancira; Gilberto Macin
- Starring: Carlos Piñar; Sonia Furió; Blanca Sánchez; Karina Duprez; Alma Muriel; Leticia Perdigón
- Country of origin: Mexico
- Original language: Spanish
- No. of episodes: 254

Production
- Executive producer: Gilberto Macin
- Production locations: Mexico City, Mexico
- Production company: Televisa

Original release
- Network: Canal 2
- Release: 1 April 1982 – 22 March 1983

Related
- El amor tiene cara de mujer (1964); El amor tiene cara de mujer (1971); Principessa (1984)

Vivir enamorada (English title: To live love) is a Mexican telenovela aired on Televisa.

== Cast ==
- Carlos Piñar as Mario
- Sonia Furió as Alicia
- Karina Duprez as Karina
- Blanca Sánchez as Miriam
- Alma Muriel as Estela
- Leticia Perdigón as María
- Carlos Rotzinger as Gilberto
- Anna Silveti as Fedora
- Juan Antonio Edwards as Horacio
- Demián Bichir as Nacho
- Mariana Levy as Verónica
- Arlette Pacheco as Raquel
- Queta Lavat as Adriana's mother
- Manolita Saval as Merceditas
- Otto Sirgo as Andres
- Luis Torner as Balbiani
- Pablo Ferrel as Leonardo
- Elvira Monsell as Florencia
- Yolanda Lievana as Sandra
- José Luis Padilla as Don Julio
- Roberto Ruy as Angel
- Luis Uribe as Juan Carlos
- Antonio Rangel as Victor

== Awards ==
Year	Award	Category	Nominee	Result
1983	1st TVyNovelas Awards	Best Female Revelation	Leticia Perdigón	Nominated
