= List of number-one hits of 1967 (Mexico) =

This is a list of the songs that reached number one in Mexico in 1967, according to Billboard magazine with data provided by Audiomusica.

== Chart history ==
Issue date	Song	Artist(s)	Ref.
January 7	"Brasilia"	Tony Mottola	
January 14	"Fuiste a Acapulco"	Los Apson	
January 21	"Fuiste a Acapulco"	Los Apson	
January 28	"Fuiste a Acapulco"	Los Apson	
February 4	"Batijugando"	Sonia López	
February 11	"Batijugando"	Sonia López	
February 18	"Batijugando"	Sonia López	
February 25	"Batijugando"	Sonia López	
March 4	"Batijugando"	Sonia López	
March 11	"El cable"	Mario y sus Diamantes	
March 18	"El cable"	Mario y sus Diamantes	
March 25	"El cable"	Mario y sus Diamantes	
April 1	"El cable"	Mario y sus Diamantes	
April 8	"El cable"	Mario y sus Diamantes	
April 15	"El cable"	Mario y sus Diamantes	
April 22	"El cable"	Mario y sus Diamantes	
April 29	"El cable"	Mario y sus Diamantes	
May 6	"Celoso"	Los Panchos / Marco Antonio Muñiz	
May 13	"Celoso"	Los Panchos / Marco Antonio Muñiz	
May 20	"Celoso"	Los Panchos / Marco Antonio Muñiz	
May 27	"Celoso"	Los Panchos / Marco Antonio Muñiz	
June 3	"Celoso"	Los Panchos / Marco Antonio Muñiz	
June 10	"Celoso"	Los Panchos / Marco Antonio Muñiz	
June 17	"Celoso"	Los Panchos / Marco Antonio Muñiz	
June 24	"Celoso"	Los Panchos / Marco Antonio Muñiz	
July 1	"Celoso"	Los Panchos / Marco Antonio Muñiz	
July 8	"Celoso"	Los Panchos / Marco Antonio Muñiz	
July 15	"Celoso"	Los Panchos / Marco Antonio Muñiz	
July 22	"Celoso"	Los Panchos / Marco Antonio Muñiz	
July 29	"Celoso"	Los Panchos / Marco Antonio Muñiz	
August 5	"Celoso"	Los Panchos / Marco Antonio Muñiz	
August 12	"Celoso"	Los Panchos / Marco Antonio Muñiz	
August 19	"Celoso"	Los Panchos / Marco Antonio Muñiz	
August 26	"Yo soy aquél"	Raphael	
September 2	"Yo soy aquél"	Raphael	
September 9	"Yo soy aquél"	Raphael	
September 16	"Yo soy aquél"	Raphael	
September 23	"Esta tarde vi llover"	Armando Manzanero	
October 7	"Esta tarde vi llover"	Armando Manzanero	
October 14	"Esta tarde vi llover"	Armando Manzanero	
October 21	"Esta tarde vi llover"	Armando Manzanero	
October 28	"Esta tarde vi llover"	Armando Manzanero	
November 4	"Musita"	Sonora Santanera	
November 11	"Musita"	Sonora Santanera	
November 18	"Musita"	Sonora Santanera	
November 25	"Musita"	Sonora Santanera	
December 2	"Musita"	Sonora Santanera	
December 9	"Musita"	Sonora Santanera	
December 16	"Quinceañera"	Los Vlamers de Marco Rayo	
December 23	"Musita"	Sonora Santanera	
December 30	"Esta tarde vi llover"	Armando Manzanero	

=== By country of origin ===
Number-one artists:

Country of origin	Number of artists	Artists
Mexico	6	Los Apson
Mexico	6	Sonia López
Mexico	6	Los Panchos
Mexico	6	Marco Antonio Muñiz
Mexico	6	Armando Manzanero
Mexico	6	Sonora Santanera
Colombia	1	Los Vlamers de Marco Rayo
Italy / Venezuela	1	Mario y sus Diamantes
Spain	1	Raphael

Number-one compositions (it denotes the country of origin of the song's composer[s]; in case the song is a cover of another one, the name of the original composition is provided in parentheses):

Country of origin	Number of compositions	Compositions
Mexico	4	"Fuiste a Acapulco"
Mexico	4	"Batijugando"
Mexico	4	"Esta tarde vi llover"
Mexico	4	"Musita"
Colombia	1	"Quinceañera"
Italy	1	"El cable"
Spain	1	"Yo soy aquél"
United States	1	"Celoso" ("Jealous Heart")

== See also ==
- 1967 in music
