= El amor tiene cara de mujer =

El amor tiene cara de mujer may refer to

- El amor tiene cara de mujer (Argentine TV series)
- El amor tiene cara de mujer (Mexican TV series)
