= Luciana Salazar =

Argentine model (born 1980)

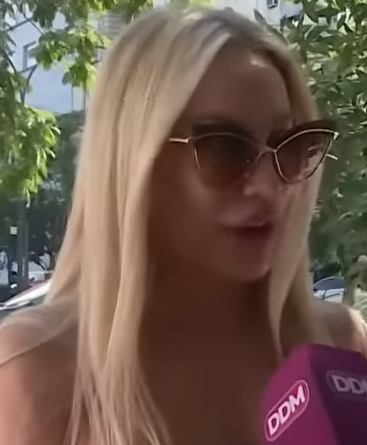
- Salazar in 2025
- Born: Luciana Salazar Moreso; 7 November 1980 (age 45); Buenos Aires, Argentina
- Occupations: Model, actress, dancer, businesswoman
- Years active: 2000–present
- Partner: Martin Redrado (-2018)
- Children: 1
- Relatives: Sebastián Ortega (cousin); Julieta Ortega (cousin); Emanuel Ortega (cousin); Luis Ortega (cousin); Evangelina Salazar (aunt)

Luciana Salazar (born 7 November 1980) is an Argentine model, actress, dancer and businesswoman.

== Biography ==
=== Modeling ===
Salazar started her career as a model at the age of four, when she shot her first television commercial. As a teenager, she began to work as a model in Buenos Aires in January 1996 and began to take dancing and singing classes.

=== Television ===
Her leap to fame was in the year 2000, when she posed for the magazines Noticias de la semana, of the Editorial Perfil, in which she was cover and Vogue en español, by Condé Nast Publications, where she came out on the pages.

Her breakthrough came with her performance on the television show Poné a Francella. In the United States, she was cover of the men's magazine Esquire, by Hearst Magazines, in October 2002. In 2003, she realized several journalistic notes for the Argentine television channel America TV and made a controversial appearance on the MTV Video Music Awards Latin America, promoting her image even more. In 2004, she participated in a hidden camera sketch, on the popular Argentinian television program VideoMatch (later ShowMatch), on the Telefé channel, hosted by Marcelo Tinelli.

She acted in the television series Costumbres argentinas, de las buenas y de las malas (2003), Los Roldán (2004), Amo de casa, Gladiadores de Pompeya. She appeared on the film Bañeros III, Todopoderosos and on Chilean television, invited by the channel Televisión Nacional de Chile on the show De Pé a Pá on 24 October 2004. She took part in the erotic television series Luli in Love on Playboy TV.

During the 2006 FIFA World Cup, Salazar was voted to be the national football team's representative, a role which many called "Godmother". On 2 December 2006, she was presented in the 2006 Telethon of Chile to host a segment called vedetón.

=== Modelling career ===
In February 2005 she was voted Queen of the Viña del Mar International Song Festival in Chile, and became a very popular personality in that country. She took part in various fashion shows, and in that same year she was the star of Abtao Fashion 2005, an event in Peru, along with 70 other Peruvian models who modeled the latest designs.

=== Other media ===
She has been reported to have been recording an album as a singer, and has participated in the movies Brigada Explosiva and Isidorito.

In 2008 she was a vedette in "Cristina en el país de las maravillas", along with Nito Artaza, Antonio Gasalla and Cacho Castaña.

In 2009, she signed a contract with the Warner Brothers label to launch 4 singles called Fascinate!, ¿Ahora que hago?, Sucios Pensamientos y Anímate a Vivir.

In 2011 she participated in fiction Un año para recordar in the role of Jasmín and as a singer in the band Main Out. In November of that year, he formed the Main Out musical project with the Cubans Seinel & Whaire, making her first presentation in the Susana Giménez program.

In 2012 she participated in the final chapters of the telenovela Graduados in the role of Mara.

In 2015 Salazar participated in the dance program Bailando por un sueño host by Marcelo Tinelli where she obtained the twelfth place after six months of competition.

In 2017 she announces to the media that she will be a mother for the first time thanks to a surrogate service. Her daughter Matilda was born in December 15, 2017 in Sarasota.

In August 2018, she made a special participation in the fiction Cien días para enamorarse playing the lawyer Silvia Cafarole and is currently an entertainer of the entertainment program and entertainment Chismoses, of the Net TV channel.

In the 30-year Showmatch program, Luciana also participates in the Super Bailando 2019.

In 2020, Luciana became a stable panelist of the classic programme Polémica en el bar.

In 2025, she joined Divasplay, the popular adult platform in the Latin America.

== Realities shows ==
Year	Title	Role	Notes
2006	Bailando por un Sueño (Argentine season 3)	Contestant	10th eliminated
2010	Bailando 2010	Contestant	Abandoned
2015	Bailando 2015	Contestant	13th eliminated
2018	Luciana Mamá	Lead role	Pilot
2019	Bailando 2019	Contestant	11th eliminated
2021	La Academia	Contestant	Abandoned
