= List of number-one hits of 1966 (Mexico) =

This is a list of the songs that reached number one in Mexico in 1966, according to Billboard magazine with data provided by Audiomusica.

Popular singer Javier Solís died on April 19. He posthumously earned his eleventh and twelfth number-one hits Una limosna and Amigo organillero.

== Chart history ==
Issue date	Song	Artist(s)	Ref.
January 1	"Es Lupe"	Los Johnny Jets	
January 8	"Es Lupe"	Los Johnny Jets	
January 15	"Es Lupe"	Los Johnny Jets	
January 22	"Es Lupe"	Los Johnny Jets	
January 29	"Es Lupe"	Los Johnny Jets	
February 5	"Es Lupe"	Los Johnny Jets	
February 12	"Es Lupe"	Los Johnny Jets	
February 19	"Es Lupe"	Los Johnny Jets	
February 26	"Por las calles de México"	Sonora Santanera	
March 5	"Es Lupe"	Los Johnny Jets	
March 12	"Mazatlán"	Mike Laure	
March 19	"Es Lupe"	Los Johnny Jets	
March 26	"La banda borracha"	Mike Laure	
April 2	"Senza fine"	The Brass Ring	
April 9	"La banda borracha"	Mike Laure	
April 16	"La banda borracha"	Mike Laure	
April 30	"La banda borracha"	Mike Laure	
May 7	"La banda borracha"	Mike Laure	
May 14	"La banda borracha"	Mike Laure	
May 21	"La banda borracha"	Mike Laure	
May 28	"Una limosna"	Javier Solís	
June 4	"Una limosna"	Javier Solís	
June 11	"Una limosna"	Javier Solís	
June 18	"Una limosna"	Javier Solís	
June 25	"Amigo organillero"	Javier Solís	
July 2	"Amigo organillero"	Javier Solís	
July 9	"Amigo organillero"	Javier Solís	
July 16	"Amigo organillero"	Javier Solís	
July 23	"Amigo organillero"	Javier Solís	
July 30	"El despertar"	Marco Antonio Muñiz	
August 6	"El despertar"	Marco Antonio Muñiz	
August 13	"El despertar"	Marco Antonio Muñiz	
August 20	"El despertar"	Marco Antonio Muñiz	
August 27	"El despertar"	Marco Antonio Muñiz	
September 3	"Mi razón"	Sonora Santanera	
September 10	"Mi razón"	Sonora Santanera	
September 17	"Mi razón"	Sonora Santanera	
October 1	"Mi razón"	Sonora Santanera	
October 8	"Senza fine"	The Brass Ring	
October 29	"Mi razón"	Sonora Santanera	
November 5	"Brasilia"	Tony Mottola	
November 19	"Fuiste a Acapulco"	Los Apson	
November 26	"Fuiste a Acapulco"	Los Apson	
December 10	"Brasilia"	Tony Mottola	
December 17	"El botones"	Sonora Santanera	
December 24	"Senza fine"	The Brass Ring	
December 31	"Fuiste a Acapulco"	Los Apson	

=== By country of origin ===
Number-one artists:

Country of origin	Number of artists	Artists
Mexico	7	Los Johnny Jets
Mexico	7	Sonora Santanera
Mexico	7	Mike Laure
Mexico	7	Los Rockin' Devils
Mexico	7	Javier Solís
Mexico	7	Marco Antonio Muñiz
Mexico	7	Los Apson
United States	2	The Brass Ring
United States	2	Tony Mottola

Number-one compositions (it denotes the country of origin of the song's composer[s]; in case the song is a cover of another one, the name of the original composition is provided in parentheses):

Country of origin	Number of compositions	Compositions
Mexico	8	"Por las calles de México"
Mexico	8	"Mazatlán"
Mexico	8	"Una limosna"
Mexico	8	"Amigo organillero"
Mexico	8	"El despertar"
Mexico	8	"Mi razón"
Mexico	8	"Fuiste a Acapulco"
Mexico	8	"El botones"
United States	2	"Es Lupe" ("Hang On Sloopy")
United States	2	"Brasilia"
Colombia	1	"La banda borracha"
Italy	1	"Senza fine"

== See also ==
- 1966 in music

== Sources ==
- Print editions of the Billboard magazine from January 1, 1966, to January 7, 1967.
