= Luis Ortega (film director) =

Argentine screenwriter, film director and television director

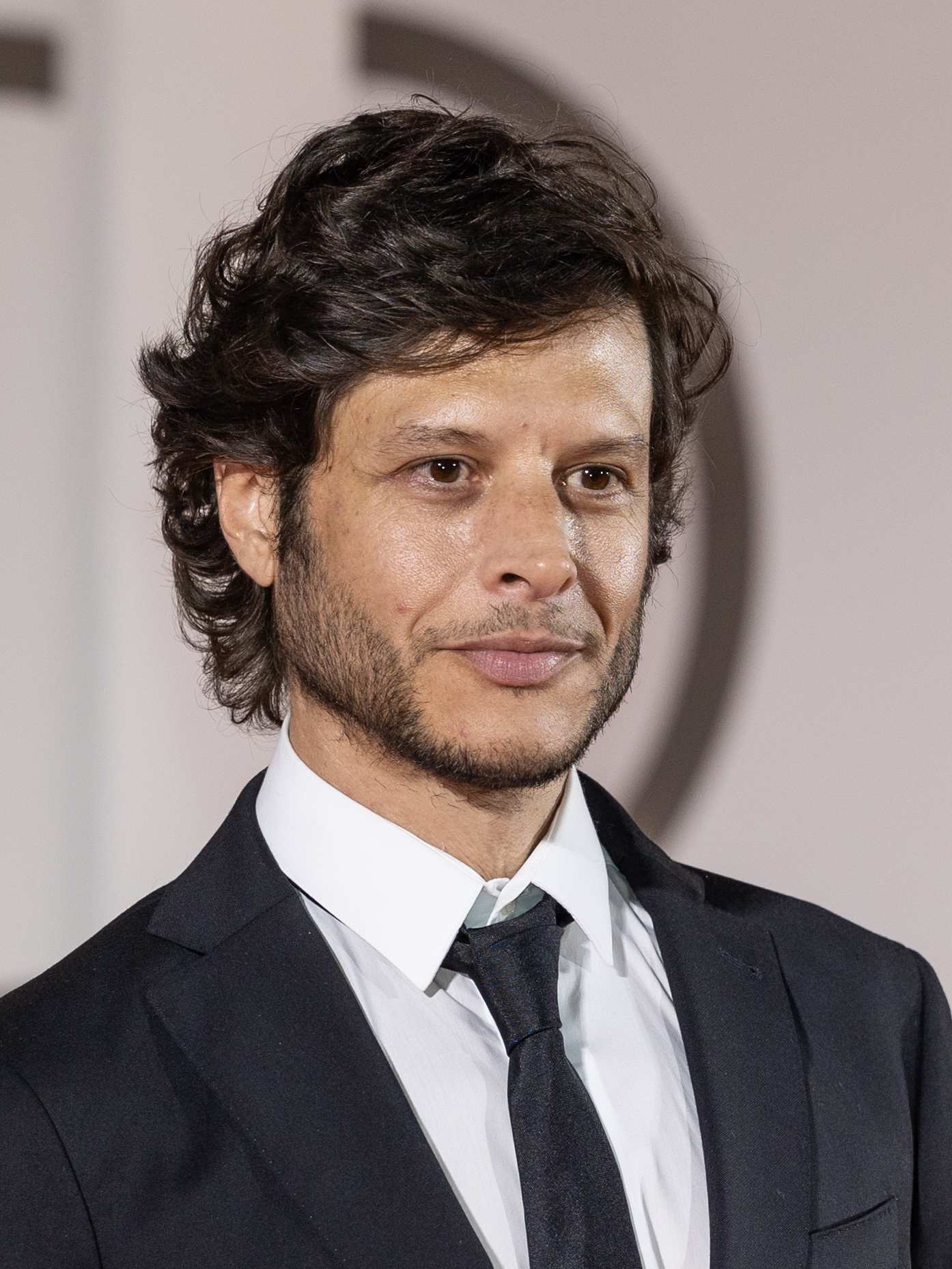
- Ortega in 2024
- Born: 12 July 1980 (age 44); Buenos Aires, Argentina
- Occupations: Screenwriter; Film and television director
- Years active: 2002–present
- Children: 1
- Parents: Palito Ortega (father); Evangelina Salazar (mother)
- Relatives: Julieta Ortega (sister); Sebastián Ortega (brother); Emanuel Ortega (brother); Luciana Salazar (cousin)

Luis Ortega (Buenos Aires; July 12, 1980) is an Argentine film director and screenwriter. He grew up in the province of Tucumán and returned to his hometown at the age of 16. At 19, he filmed his debut feature, Black Box (2002). His film El Angel (2018) was selected for the Cannes Film Festival in the Un Certain Regard section, and Kill the Jockey (2024) competed in the International Competition of the Venice Film Festival.

== Career ==
After a series of very low-budget independent films, he wrote and directed the impactful series Historia de Un Clan, where he left a mark with strong lyrical and erotic undertones. He also composed the musical theme for the series, Fantasma Ejemplar, performed by Daniel Melingo.

In 2017, he filmed El Angel, which became one of the highest-grossing films in the history of Argentine cinema, with 1,400,000 tickets sold. It was selected by the Cannes Film Festival for the Un Certain Regard section of its 71st edition. It was also chosen to represent Argentina at the Oscars in the category of Best Foreign Language Film.

In 2020, he directed two episodes of the series Narcos: Mexico for Netflix.

In 2024, he premiered his film Kill the Jockey in the Official Competition at the 81st Venice International Film Festival, and it was also selected to represent Argentina by the Academy of Motion Picture Arts and Sciences (Oscars) in the category of Best International Feature Film.

He is currently developing his next feature, Magnetizado.

== Filmography ==
- Black Box (2002)
- Monobloc (2005)
- Lulu (2014)
- El Angel (2018)
- Kill the Jockey (2024)
