= María Eugenia Ríos =

Mexican actress (1935–2024)

- Born: María Eugenia Ríos Romero; 4 August 1935; Mexico City, Mexico
- Died: 1 August 2024 (aged 88); Mexico City, Mexico
- Occupation: Actress
- Years active: 1954–2014
- Spouse: Oscar Morelli

María Eugenia Ríos Romero (4 August 1935 – 1 August 2024) was a Mexican actress. Among her most notable works were the telenovelas she participated in, namely Pablo y Elena (1963), El medio pelo (1966), Rubí (1968), Chucho el Roto (1968–1969), and Desencuentro (1997–1998).

== Biography ==
=== Early life ===
María Eugenia Ríos Romero was born on 4 August 1935 in Mexico City, the daughter of Roberto Ríos. Since her childhood, her brothers noticed her fondness for theater, and she herself declared that she was excited to see actors in the movies, being especially influenced by her father, a worker at the Churubusco studios who used to take she and her brothers to his work to see how Mexican films were made. Thanks to her father's job, she had an academic education in some of the best private schools in Mexico City, including "Queen Mary", an institution run by nuns, which Ríos left when the director found out about her desires to be an actress, deciding not to return because of the attitude that the school's management took with her.

When she told her father of her intentions to study acting, he refused and opposed due to his strict way of being, to the point of stopping talking to her. However, Ríos eventually accepted, after being given the condition that she would be allowed to study the art if she also pursued a degree. As a result, she trained as a bilingual secretary at the Universidad de las Américas, A.C., from which she graduated at the age of 17, while also taking English and acting classes at City College.

=== 1954–2003: marriage and artistic consecration ===
In 1954, Ríos began her formal training as an actress at the Andrés Soler Academy, belonging to the National Association of Actors (ANDA), where she had as teachers Celestino Gorostiza, Salvador Novo, and Seki Sano. The same year, she made her acting debut at the Palacio de Bellas Artes, where she starred in a play by the American playwright Arthur Miller, to which she was invited by Sano. Two years later, in 1958, she was contacted by Fernando Soler to invite her to go on a theatrical tour, where she met the actor Óscar Morelli; according to her, they both fell in love at first sight, and later, they married on 2 June of the same year. Together they had four children: Gustavo, María Eugenia, and actors Óscar Bonfiglio and Andrés Bonfiglio Ríos. In 1956, Ríos made her film debut in the year that the Golden Age of Mexican cinema ended, appearing in a supporting role in the film Locura pasional. In 1962, she made her television debut with the soap operas La herencia and Penumbra. She then decided to continue working for similar productions throughout the 1960s, standing out for telenovelas such as Pablo y Elena in 1963, El medio pelo in 1966, Anita de Montemar in 1967, Rubí in 1968, and Chucho el Roto, in which she acted from 1968 to 1969. From the latter, a franchise of films was born around the Mexican bandit Chucho el Roto, personified by Manuel López Ochoa, with which she consecrated her career by playing the role of Guadalupe Arriaga in La vida de Chucho el Roto, Yo soy Chucho el Roto, and Los amores de Chucho el Roto, the three films from 1970, and the saga ended a year later with El olvides Chucho el Roto, from 1971. In that last year, she dedicated herself arduously to philanthropy, supporting various organizations in favor of the humanity, standing out for founding the Rosa Mexicano group, the Dolores del Río ANDA Children's Center together with Dolores del Río, Carmen Montejo, Alicia Montoya, Yolanda Mérida, and María Elena Marqués, the founding of the ANDA women's commission, and she joined the Substitute Mothers group at the Coyoacán Home for the Children, where she helped raise orphaned children.

Eleven years later, in 1982, Ríos reached the highest stage of her artistic career, after making a brief appearance as a supporting actress in Missing, an American film in which she shared credits with Jack Lemmon and Sissy Spacek. Later, she continued making films acting in well-known titles such as Pero sigo siendo el rey (But I'm Still the King) in 1988, Morros desmadrosos (Deadly Morros) in 1989, Triste juventud (Sad Youth) in 1990, and her final film, Ataque salvaje (Wild Attack) in 1995. Ultimately, she finished her filmography on television with participations in telenovelas and TV series such as Cañaveral de Pasiones and La culpa (The Fault) in 1996, Desencuentro (Disagreement) from 1997 to 1998, Mujer, casos de la vida real (Woman, Real Life Cases) from 1997 to 2001, and Carita de ángel (Angel Face) from 2000 to 2001.

=== 2003–2022: Later works and retirement ===
In 2003, Ríos returned to the theater with the play Madame Curie, in which she was directed by her husband Óscar Morelli. Two years later, and after 47 years of marriage, Morelli died in 2005 due to lung failure. This event had a very shocking effect on her life, so that same year, she retired from the artistic world; it was not until 2014 that she reappeared, to again be part of the play Madame Curie, in which she was for a brief season in homage to her 60-year career, before retiring again and withdrawing from public life completely.

Thanks to her career and her contributions to humanitarian causes, in 2022, Ríos received the Gobe Award in recognition of women leaders, which was collected by actress Marta Zamora on her behalf, since she could not attend the awards ceremony.

== Death ==
On 1 August 2024, Ríos died in Mexico City at the age of 88.

== Filmography ==
=== Film ===
| Year | Title | Role | Notes |
|---|---|---|---|
| 1956 | Locura pasional | María | |
| 1963 | Los signos del zodiaco | Estela | |
| 1965 | El juicio de Arcadio | Unknown character | |
| 1970 | La vida de Chucho el Roto | Guadalupe Arriaga | |
| 1970 | Yo soy Chucho el Roto | Guadalupe Arriaga | |
| 1970 | Los amores de Chucho el Roto | Guadalupe Arriaga | |
| 1971 | El inolvidable Chucho el Roto | Guadalupe Arriaga | |
| 1982 | Missing | Mrs. Duran | Credited as M.E. Rios; American production |
| 1982 | El naco más naco | Unknown character | |
| 1988 | Pero sigo siendo el rey | Unknown character | |
| 1989 | Morros desmadrosos | Unknown character | |
| 1990 | Triste juventud | Unknown character | |
| 1995 | Ataque salvaje | Unknown character | |

=== Television ===
| Año | Título | Papel | Notas |
|---|---|---|---|
| 1962 | La herencia | Unknown character | |
| 1962 | Penumbra | Unknown character | |
| 1963 | La familia Miau | Unknown character | |
| 1963 | Eugenia | Unknown character | |
| 1963 | Pablo y Elena | Unknown character | |
| 1964 | La intrusa | Unknown character | |
| 1964 | Central de emergencia | Unknown character | |
| 1964 | La doctora | Unknown character | |
| 1966 | El medio pelo | Unknown character | |
| 1966 | La sombra del pecado | Unknown character | |
| 1967 | Felipa Sánchez, la soldadera | Elvira | |
| 1967 | Anita de Montemar | Ofelia | |
| 1968 | Destino la gloria | Blanca | |
| 1968 | Rubí | Cristina Pérez Carvajal, sister of Rubí | |
| 1968–69 | Chucho el Roto | Guadalupe Arriaga | |
| 1970 | La constitución | Sara Pérez Romero | |
| 1970 | El Dios de barro | Unknown character | |
| 1971 | El amor tiene cara de mujer | Consuelo viuda de Suárez | |
| 1972 | Me llaman Martina Sola | Unknown character | |
| 1974 | Ana del aire | Inés | |
| 1976 | Mañana será otro día | Esperanza | |
| 1979 | Bella y bestia | Unknown character | |
| 1979 | Julia | Unknown character | |
| 1979 | Una mujer marcada | Gloria | |
| 1980 | Querer volar | Dolores | Miniseries |
| 1988 | Encadenados | Natalia | |
| 1989 | Lo blanco y lo negro | Raymunda | |
| 1993 | María Mercedes | Director of the reformatory | |
| 1995 | Bajo un mismo rostro | Madre Esperanza | |
| 1996 | Cañaveral de pasiones | Amalia de Aldapa | |
| 1996 | La culpa | Lolita | |
| 1997–98 | Desencuentro | Queta | |
| 1997–2001 | Mujer, casos de la vida real | Various characters | Four episodes |
| 2000–2001 | Carita de ángel | Esperanza Ortiz | |
