= Sebastián Ortega =

Argentine television producer, screenwriter, production director and actor

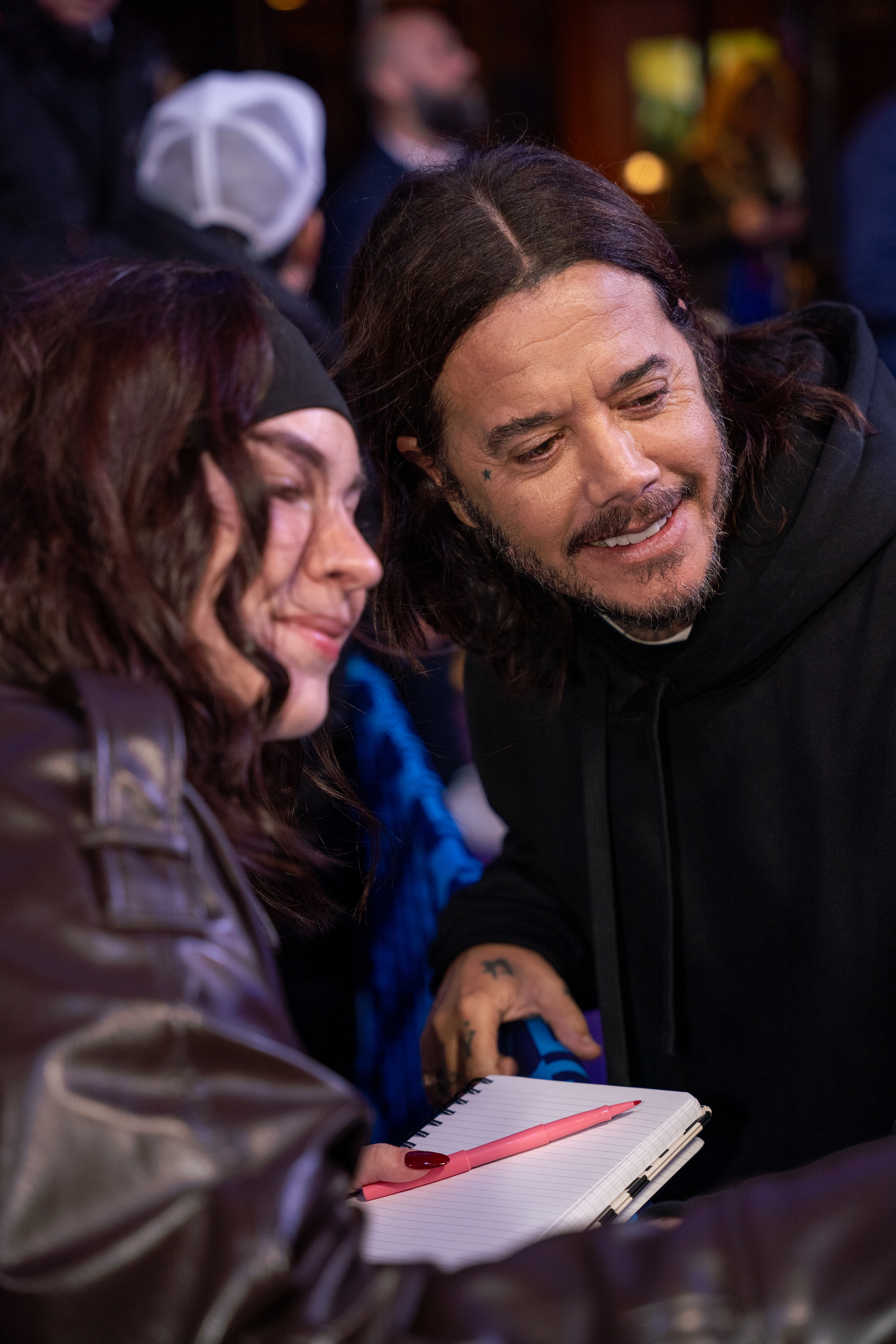
- Born: 14 August 1973 (age 52); Buenos Aires, Argentina
- Occupations: Television producer; screenwriter; production director; actor
- Years active: 2001–present
- Spouse: Guillermina Valdés (m. 2009–2011)
- Partners: Ivana Figueiras (2011–2014); Carla Moure (2014–¿?); Valentina Zenere (2024-present)
- Children: 3
- Parents: Palito Ortega (father); Evangelina Salazar (mother)
- Relatives: Julieta Ortega (sister); Emanuel Ortega (brother); Luis Ortega (brother) Rosario Ortega (sister); Luciana Salazar (cousin)

Sebastián Ortega (born 14 August 1973) is an Argentine television producer, screenwriter, production director and actor.

== Early life ==
Sebastián Ortega was born on 14 August 1973 in Buenos Aires. He is the son of singer Palito Ortega and actress Evangelina Salazar. He is the brother of Martín Ortega Salazar, Julieta Ortega, Emanuel Ortega, Luis Ortega and Rosario Ortega Salazar and cousin of vedette Luciana Salazar, model Camila Salazar, Maite Salazar and Marisol Salazar. He lived in Miami, Florida, from 1985 until the year 2000. Sebastián and his family had to travel to Tucumán, because Palito Ortega was elected Governor.

== Career ==
His career as a producer began in 2001, with El Hacker 2001, a dramatic miniseries about a renowned Argentine hacker who refused to participate in the Falklands War. That same year he produced EnAmorArte with his brother Emanuel Ortega as the protagonist. In 2002 he produced Tumberos.

In 2003 he produced Sol negro, about life within a neuropsychiatric, which was very well received by critics. He produced the series Disputas and Costumbres argentinas. His next project was Ser urbano, a documentary led by Gastón Pauls.

In 2004 he produced Los Roldán, a series starring Florencia de la V, Miguel Ángel Rodríguez, and Gabriel Goity. This series won a Martín Fierro Award.

Ortega and Pablo Culell were managers at Ideas Del Sur, until Sebastián decided to leave because Canal 13 wanted to start making entertainment programs, and the company would start making entertainment in 2007.

Ortega and Cullel then founded Underground Producciones. In 2007 in association with Dori Media he produced Lalola broadcast by América TV. In 2008 he created and produced Los exitosos Pells in association with Telefe Contenidos and Endemol. This telecomedy was sold to more than 40 countries.

In 2009 he premiered Botineras, a series starring Nicolás Cabré, Isabel Macedo and Florencia Peña.

In 2012 he produced the multi-award-winning telecomedy Graduados.

In 2013 he produced comedy series Los Vecinos en Guerra. The series flopped, and then took a more police turn. In 2014 the unitary La celebración and the comedy Viudas e hijos del Rock & Roll premiered. In 2015, the successful Historia de un clan related the history of Clan Puccio. It was directed by his brother, Luis Ortega. In 2016 he produced the family comedy Educando a Nina. That same year the unitary El marginal premiered. It achieved worldwide distribution, released in October 2016 by Netflix and in January 2018 by Universal Channel.

In 2017 Underground Producciones premiered the comedy series Fanny, la fan. That same year he produced the series Un gallo para Esculapio, a series starring Juan Pedro Lanzani. In 2018 the second season of El marginal premiered along with the series Gigoló, El extranjero and 100 días para enamorarse.

== Personal life ==
Ortega met model Guillermina Valdés in June 1998. In 2001 the couple's first child Dante was born, followed in 2002 by Paloma. In 2005 Helena was. On September 25, 2009 he married Valdés. In 2012 they separated and Sebastián had a strong confrontation with the television host Marcelo Tinelli, his ex-wife's boyfriend. At end of 2014 he formed a relationship with Carla Moure.

== Awards and honors ==
- Konex Foundation award (2011)
