= I Like That Girl =

1973 film directed by Enrique Carreras

Me gusta esa chica
- Directed by: Enrique Carreras
- Written by: Alfonso Paso; Ulises Petit de Murat
- Music by: Tito Ribero; Palito Ortega
- Release date: 29 March 1973
- Running time: 80 minute
- Country: Argentina
- Language: Spanish

I Like That Girl (Me gusta esa chica) is a 1973 Argentine film directed by Enrique Carreras and written by Alfonso Paso and Ulises Petit de Murat.

== Synopsis ==
The son of a remarkable surgeon wants to be a singer and falls in love with a young Bohemian girl.

== Cast ==
- Palito Ortega ... Dr. Carlos Conesa
- Evangelina Salazar ... Flavia
- Raúl Rossi ... Dr. Conesa padre
- Irma Córdoba ... Margarita de Galíndez
- Fidel Pintos ... Nepo
- Arturo Puig ... Ramón
- María de los Ángeles Medrano ... Alma
- Nya Quesada ... Remedios
- Victoria Berni
- Jacques Arndt
- Edith Boado
- Rodolfo Machado ... Conductor de colectivo
