= Evangelina Salazar =

Argentine actress (born 1946)

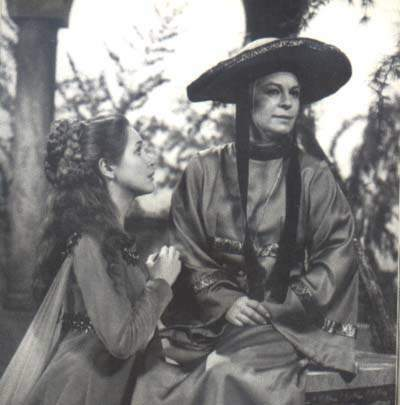
- Evangelina Salazar and María Rosa Gallo, in a scene from "Romeo and Juliet" broadcast on Channel 13 in 1966

First Lady of Tucumán Province
- In office 29 October 1991 – 29 October 1995
- Governor: Palito Ortega
- Preceded by: Marta Ortega de Araóz
- Succeeded by: Josefina Bigoglio de Bussi

Member of the Constitutional Convention for the Tucumán Province
- In role 30 May 1994 – 22 August 1994

Personal details
- Born: Evangelina Yolanda Salazar; 15 June 1946 (age 79) Buenos Aires, Argentina
- Spouse: Palito Ortega (m. 1967)
- Children: 6, including Julieta, Sebastián, Emanuel and Luis
- Relatives: Luciana Salazar (niece)
- Occupation: Actress

Evangelina Yolanda Salazar (born 15 June 1946) is an Argentine actress.

== Career ==
On television she had started in 1962 with Marilina Ross and Teresa Blasco in the cast of the cycle Señoritas alumnas of Abel Santa Cruz. She also participated in teleteachers such as El amor tiene cara de mujer of Nené Cascallar, gaining great popularity as the teacher Jacinta Pichimahuida in the mid-60s and La pícara soñadora in 1968. In 1970 she was María de los Remedios de Escalada in the movie El Santo de la Espada by Leopoldo Torre Nilsson with Alfredo Alcón, Lautaro Murúa and Héctor Alterio, on the script of Beatriz Guido and Ulises Petit de Murat. In 2001 she made a brief participation in the youth television series EnAmorArte which was starring Emanuel Ortega and produced by Sebastián Ortega. In 2004 she reappeared in the film Monobloc directed by her son Luis Ortega, winning the Silver Condor Award as a Supporting Actress. In 2011 she returned to television in the comedy Un año para recordar, broadcast by Telefe, she was the storyteller. This series was produced by her son Sebastián Ortega. In 2012 she made a special participation in the most successful comedy of the year, Graduados broadcast by Telefe. There she played a justice of the peace who married the characters of Guillermo (Juan Gil Navarro) and Fernando (Ivo Cutzarida). This fiction was also produced by her son Sebastián Ortega.

== Personal life ==
In 1967 she married the singer Palito Ortega and they had six children, Martín Ortega, Julieta Ortega, Sebastián Ortega, Emanuel Ortega, Luis Ortega and Rosario Ortega.

== Filmography ==
=== Movies ===
Year	Movie	Character	Director
1959	Evangelina		
1963	Lindor Covas, el cimarrón		Carlos Cores
1966	Mi primera novia	Elvira	Enrique Carreras
1966	Arm in Arm Down the Street		Enrique Carreras
1968	Operación San Antonio	Soledad Domínguez	Enrique Carreras
1970	El Santo de la espada	María de los Remedios de Escalada	Leopoldo Torre Nilsson
1971	On the Beach by the Sea	Donald's bride	Enrique Cahen Salaberry
1973	Me gusta esa chica	Flavia	Enrique Carreras
1976	Dos locos en el aire		Palito Ortega
1979	Vivir con alegría	Julieta	Palito Ortega
2004	Monobloc		Luis Ortega

=== Television ===
Year	Title	Character	Channel
1962	Señoritas alumnas		
1966	El amor tiene cara de mujer	Jacinta Pichimahuida	Canal 13
1968	La pícara soñadora		
2001	EnAmorArte	Santiago's mom	Telefe
2011	Un año para recordar	Storyteller	Telefe
2012	Graduados	Justice of the Peace	Telefe

== Awards and nominations ==
Year	Award	Category	Work	Result
1966	San Sebastián Festival	Best Actress	Arm in Arm Down the Street	Winner
1967	Silver Condor Award	Best Actress	Arm in Arm Down the Street	Winner
2007	Silver Condor Award	Best Supporting Actress	Monobloc	Winner
