= List of number-one hits of 1963 (Peru) =

This is a list of the songs that reached number one in Peru in 1963, according to Billboard magazine with data provided by the Peruvian newspaper, La Prensa.

Issue date	Song	Artist(s)	Ref
January 5	"Speedy Gonzales"	Manolo Muñoz/Pat Boone/Jorge Conty/Los Gorrioncitos/Los Campeones	
January 12	"Speedy Gonzales"	Manolo Muñoz/Pat Boone/Jorge Conty/Los Gorrioncitos/Los Campeones	
January 19	"Speedy Gonzales"	Manolo Muñoz/Pat Boone/Jorge Conty/Los Gorrioncitos/Los Campeones	
January 26	"Speedy Gonzales"	Manolo Muñoz/Pat Boone/Jorge Conty/Los Gorrioncitos/Los Campeones	
February 2	"Speedy Gonzales"	Manolo Muñoz/Pat Boone/Jorge Conty/Los Gorrioncitos/Los Campeones	
February 9	"La Tómbola"	Mirla Castellanos/Lucho Macedo/Niko Estrada/Anabella/Enzo Roldán	
February 16	"La Tómbola"	Mirla Castellanos/Lucho Macedo/Niko Estrada/Anabella/Enzo Roldán	
February 23	"El Twist de los ojos negros"	Tulio Gallo	
March 2	"El Twist de los ojos negros"	Tulio Gallo	
March 9	"Esperanza"	Pedrito Rico/Tito Alberti/Los Españoles/Lucho Macedo/Enrique Lynch	
March 16	"Esperanza"	Pedrito Rico/Tito Alberti/Los Españoles/Lucho Macedo/Enrique Lynch	
March 23	"Esperanza"	Pedrito Rico/Tito Alberti/Los Españoles/Lucho Macedo/Enrique Lynch	
March 30	"Esperanza"	Pedrito Rico/Tito Alberti/Los Españoles/Lucho Macedo/Enrique Lynch	
April 6	"Esperanza"	Pedrito Rico/Tito Alberti/Los Españoles/Lucho Macedo/Enrique Lynch	
April 13	"Esperanza"	Pedrito Rico/Tito Alberti/Los Españoles/Lucho Macedo/Enrique Lynch	
April 20	"Al di là"	Emilio Pericoli/Connie Francis/Lucho Gatica/Los Gorrioncitos/Marco Antonio Muñiz	
April 27	"Al di là"	Emilio Pericoli/Connie Francis/Lucho Gatica/Los Gorrioncitos/Marco Antonio Muñiz	
May 4	"Al di là"	Emilio Pericoli/Connie Francis/Lucho Gatica/Los Gorrioncitos/Marco Antonio Muñiz	
May 11	"Al di là"	Emilio Pericoli/Connie Francis/Lucho Gatica/Los Gorrioncitos/Marco Antonio Muñiz	
May 18	"Al di là"	Emilio Pericoli/Connie Francis/Lucho Gatica/Los Gorrioncitos/Marco Antonio Muñiz	
June 1	"Al di là"	Emilio Pericoli/Connie Francis/Lucho Gatica/Los Gorrioncitos/Marco Antonio Muñiz	
June 8	"Al di là"	Emilio Pericoli/Connie Francis/Lucho Gatica/Los Gorrioncitos/Marco Antonio Muñiz	
June 15	"Al di là"	Emilio Pericoli/Connie Francis/Lucho Gatica/Los Gorrioncitos/Marco Antonio Muñiz	
June 22	"Al di là"	Emilio Pericoli/Connie Francis/Lucho Gatica/Los Gorrioncitos/Marco Antonio Muñiz	
June 29	"Al di là"	Emilio Pericoli/Connie Francis/Lucho Gatica/Los Gorrioncitos/Marco Antonio Muñiz	
July 6	"Al di là"	Emilio Pericoli/Connie Francis/Lucho Gatica/Los Gorrioncitos/Marco Antonio Muñiz	
July 13	"Blame It on the Bossa Nova"	Eydie Gormé	
July 20	"Blame It on the Bossa Nova"	Eydie Gormé	
July 27	"La pera madura"	Pepe Miranda	
August 3	"La pera madura"	Pepe Miranda	
August 10	"La pera madura"	Pepe Miranda	
August 17	"La pera madura"	Pepe Miranda	
August 24	"La pera madura"	Pepe Miranda	
August 31	"La pera madura"	Pepe Miranda	
September 7	"La pera madura"	Pepe Miranda	
September 14	"El Ladrón"	Sonia López	
September 21	"La terza luna"	Neil Sedaka	
September 28	"La terza luna"	Neil Sedaka	
October 5	"Magia blanca"	Chucho Avellanet/Gustavo Moreno/Johnny Lion	
October 12	"Magia blanca"	Chucho Avellanet/Gustavo Moreno/Johnny Lion	
October 19	"Magia blanca"	Chucho Avellanet/Gustavo Moreno/Johnny Lion	
October 26	"Magia blanca"	Chucho Avellanet/Gustavo Moreno/Johnny Lion	
November 2	"Magia blanca"	Chucho Avellanet/Gustavo Moreno/Johnny Lion	
November 9	"Magia blanca"	Chucho Avellanet/Gustavo Moreno/Johnny Lion	
November 16	"Magia blanca"	Chucho Avellanet/Gustavo Moreno/Johnny Lion	
November 23	"Magia blanca"	Chucho Avellanet/Gustavo Moreno/Johnny Lion	
November 30	"Magia blanca"	Chucho Avellanet/Gustavo Moreno/Johnny Lion	
December 7	"Mira como me balanceo (Guarda come dondolo)"	Edoardo Vianello/Juan Ramón	
December 21	"Mira como me balanceo (Guarda come dondolo)"	Edoardo Vianello/Juan Ramón	
December 28	"Mira como me balanceo (Guarda come dondolo)"	Edoardo Vianello/Juan Ramón	

== See also ==
- 1963 in music
