= Los Apson =

1960s Mexican rock-n-roll band

Los Apson is a former Mexican rock-n-roll band, best known in the 1960s for their Spanish language cover versions of famous songs.

== History ==
The band was formed in 1957 by Arturo Durazo, a guitarist and a rock-n-roll enthusiast, with his brother Francisco “Pancho” Durazo. Both of them had a relatively easy access to popular English hits of the time as they lived in the border town of Agua Prieta, Sonora. Originally named Los Apson Boys, they quickly shortened it to Los Apson, the band's name came from the first letters of the town, and the first three from the state. They were quickly joined by José Luis García and Frankie Gámez along with Raúl Hernández Cota and Gil Maldonado. Despite the town's preference for ranchera music, they gained a following which expanded beyond the borders of their small town.

The band was criticised for being malinchistas, by virtue of performing American rather than Mexican music.

== Success ==
The band gained national success, with several commercially successful singles, including covers of the Beatles' hit "And I Love Her" and the bluegrass classic "Cotton Fields". But perhaps their biggest hit was Fuiste a Acapulco, a comedic song about a man who complains to his girlfriend that she went to Acapulco without telling him, written by Ascención Soto Rojas and released by Los Apson in 1966. The song topped the Mexican charts for six non-consecutive weeks between 1966 and 1967.

== Albums ==
- 1963: Llegaron Los Apson
- 1963: Bailando y Cantando Con Los Apson
- 1964: Atrás De La Raya
- 1964: El Barba Azul
- 1964: Aleluya
- 1965: Satisfacción
- 1965: Por Eso Estamos como Estamos!
- 1965: ¡Nuevos Éxitos!
- 1966: No Hay Amor
- 1967: En Ritmo!
- 1967: El Arado
- 1969: El Compadre Vacilador
