= Monobloc (film) =

- Theatrical release poster
- Directed by: Luis Ortega
- Written by: Carolina Fal; Luis Ortega
- Produced by: Micaela Buye; Martín Feldman; Villa Vicio
- Starring: Graciela Borges; Carolina Fal
- Cinematography: Octavio Lobisolo; Jorge Pastorino
- Edited by: César Custodio
- Music by: Leandro Chiappe
- Distributed by: Villa Vicio
- Release date: June 9, 2005 (Argentina)
- Running time: 83 minutes
- Country: Argentina
- Language: Spanish

Monobloc (Monoblock) is a 2005 Argentine film, directed by Luis Ortega, his second feature, and written by Ortega and Carolina Fal. The film stars Graciela Borges, Rita Cortese, Carolina Fal, and Evangelina Salazar, the filmmaker's own mother.

== Plot ==
The film tells the story of three women who live in an undistinguished apartment block in a chaotic world.

Perla, her disabled daughter Nena, and their next-door neighbor Madrina, spend their days engaged in unrealistic conversations.

For example, Perla dreams of resuming her study of the French language although she is in constant need of blood transfusions to delay her imminent death.

The transfusions are performed by a mysterious female staff member in a surreal stark-white hospital room, and provide rare glimpses of the world outside the block.

== Cast ==
- Graciela Borges as Perla
- Rita Cortese as Madrina
- Carolina Fal as Nena
- Evangelina Salazar
- Silvia Süller

== Distribution ==
The film opened in Argentina on June 9, 2005.

The film was shown at various film festivals, including: the Toronto International Film Festival, Canada; the Indianapolis International Film Festival, United States; the El Grito Sagrado Film Festival, Argentina and others.

== Critical reception ==
Critic Diana Sanchez enjoyed Ortega's direction, and wrote, "What I like best about Monobloc is that Ortega is not afraid to take risks; he creates an unknown environment using normally straightforward cinematographic elements like sound, camera movements and seemingly impossible locations. He aims to jar the audience from complacency and elicit a reaction. Although it portrays a universe very different from our own, the film asks: are not some of our preoccupations equally absurd? Does our world really make any sense? The ever-present tension that permeates the film hints at a bleak vision of a society that is hurtling towards self-destruction."

Jonathan Holland, film critic at Variety, gave the film a mixed review and wrote, "Pretentious, dreamlike Monobloc is a ponderous attempt by sophomore helmer Luis Ortega to achieve auteur status. Designed, by the helmer's own surprising admission, to be beyond total comprehensibility, the pic is love-it-or-hate-it fare featuring a strong cast and crew who have whipped up a sumptuous-looking and sometimes seductive piece that throws away the rulebook, but unlike David Lynch's best work seems uninterested in supplying any rules of its own."

== Awards ==
Wins

- Buenos Aires International Festival of Independent Cinema: Special Mention, Luis Ortega; 2005.
- Havana Film Festival: Best Art Direction, Mercedes Alfonsín; 2005.
- San Sebastián International Film Festival: Horizons Award - Special Mention; Luis Ortega; 2005.
- Argentine Film Critics Association Awards: Silver Condor, Best Art Direction, Mercedes Alfonsín; Best Supporting Actress, Evangelina Salazar; 2007.

Nominations

- Argentine Film Critics Association Awards: Silver Condor, Best Actress, Carolina Fal; Best Cinematography, Jorge Pastorino; Best Sound, Martín Porta and Catriel Vildosola; 2007.
