= Juventud, divino tesoro =

Mexican telenovela

- Genre: Telenovela
- Country of origin: Mexico
- Original language: Spanish

Original release
- Network: Telesistema Mexicano
- Release: 1968

Juventud divino tesoro, is a Mexican telenovela produced by Televisa, which was originally transmitted by Telesistema Mexicano.

== Cast ==
- Irma Lozano
- Héctor Bonilla
- Jorge Ortiz de Pinedo
- Renata Flores
