= Anita de Montemar =

Mexican telenovela

- Genre: Telenovela
- Created by: Leandro Bravo
- Directed by: Jesús Valero
- Country of origin: Mexico
- Original language: Spanish

Production
- Producer: Valentín Pimstein

Original release
- Network: Telesistema Mexicano
- Release: 1967

Anita de Montemar, is a Mexican telenovela produced by Valentín Pimstein and originally transmitted by Teleprogramas Acapulco, SA.

== Cast ==
- Amparo Rivelles as Anita de Montemar
- Raúl Ramírez as Ingeniero Carlos Miranda
- Irma Lozano as Alicia Miranda de Montemar
- Magda Guzmán as Carlota
- Sara García
- Carlos Navarro
- María Eugenia Ríos as Ofelia
- Jorge Lavat as Héctor
- Jorge Mateos
- Fernando Mendoza
- Tara Parra as Catalina Rivas
- Carlos Bracho as Dr. Mendoza
- Mercedes Pascual as Conchita
- Josefina Escobedo as Constanza
- Miguel Suárez as Sr. Mercado
