= Irma Lozano =

Mexican actress

- Born: 24 August 1943; Monterrey, Mexico
- Died: 21 October 2013 (aged 70); Mexico City, Mexico
- Occupation: Actress
- Years active: 1963–2013

Irma Lozano (24 August 1943 – 21 October 2013) was a Mexican actress. She appeared in more than twenty soap operas.

== Selected filmography ==
TV
Year	Title	Role	Notes		
1963	La culpa de los padres				
1965-1970	I Dream of Jeannie	Jeannie	Latin American Spanish Dub	1966	María Isabel
El medio pelo				1966	
Los medio hogares				1966	
1967	Anita de Montemar				
1968	Rubí				
1968	Mujeres sin amor				
1968	Juventud divino tesoro				
1969	La familia				
1970	La Gata				
1970	Mariana				
1970	Y volveré				
1971–1973	El amor tiene cara de mujer				
1973	El honorable Señor Valdez				
1989	Mi segunda madre				
2000–2001	Carita de ángel				
2004–2005	Misión S.O.S				
2007	Destilando Amor				
