= Let's Get Together (Hayley Mills song) =

Single by Hayley Mills

from the album Let's Get Together with Hayley Mills
- B-side: "Cobbler, Cobbler"
- Released: 1961
- Genre: Pop
- Length: 1:28
- Label: Buena Vista
- Songwriters: Robert B. Sherman; Richard M. Sherman; Disney Chorus
- Producer: Salvador Camarata

Hayley Mills singles chronology
"Let's Get Together" (1961)	"Johnny Jingo" (1962)

"Let's Get Together" is a song written by Robert and Richard Sherman for the 1961 Disney film The Parent Trap.

== Background ==
It was sung in the film by teen actress Hayley Mills, using double-tracking because she played both the roles of twin sisters. Annette Funicello and Tommy Sands also did a version of the song in the film, which is heard during the dance at the summer camp.

== Chart performance ==
When released on disc, the song debuted on the Billboard Hot 100 in September 1961 (b/w "Cobbler, Cobbler") and went on to become a top 10 hit, peaking at number 8. The credit on the single reads "Hayley Mills and Hayley Mills", a tongue-in-cheek reference to Mills apparently singing a duet with herself. Released in the UK, it reached the top 20, peaking at number 17. The song peaked at 6 in New Zealand on the lever hit parade charts in 1962. In 1963, the song reached #1 in Mexico. The song's success led Mills to record an album, Let's Get Together with Hayley Mills, which included "Let's Get Together" and Mills' only other hit song, "Johnny Jingo."

== Cover versions ==
- A Spanish-language cover of the song, titled "Vayamos Juntos" and recorded by Las Hermanas Jiménez, was one of the most successful recordings of 1963 in that country.
- The Go-Go's performed a cover on DisneyMania 5 and a live version recorded by Oh-OK is compiled on The Complete Recordings.

== Homages ==
- A homage to the original appeared in the 1998 remake of the film, with Lindsay Lohan singing the title line, and Nobody's Angel performing the soundtrack version.
