= Mujeres sin amor =

Mexican telenovela

- Genre: Telenovela
- Country of origin: Mexico
- Original language: Spanish

Original release
- Network: Telesistema Mexicano
- Release: 1968

Mujeres sin amor, is a Mexican telenovela produced by Televisa and originally transmitted by Telesistema Mexicano.

== Cast ==
- Miguel Manzano
- Magda Guzmán
- Anita Blanch
- Chela Nájera
- Irma Lozano
