= Lulu (2014 film) =

2014 film

- Film poster
- Directed by: Luis Ortega
- Written by: Luis Ortega
- Starring: Nahuel Pérez Biscayart
- Release date: 8 September 2014 (TIFF)
- Running time: 84 minutes
- Country: Argentina
- Language: Spanish

Lulu is a 2014 Argentine drama film directed by Luis Ortega. It was selected to be screened in the Contemporary World Cinema section at the 2014 Toronto International Film Festival.

== Cast ==
- Nahuel Pérez Biscayart
- Ailín Salas
- Daniel Melingo
