= Pablo y Elena =

Mexican telenovela

- Genre: Telenovela
- Country of origin: Mexico
- Original language: Spanish

Original release
- Network: Telesistema Mexicano
- Release: 1963

Pablo y Elena is a Mexican telenovela produced by Televisa for Telesistema Mexicano in 1963.

== Cast ==
- Tony Carbajal as Pablo
- Patricia Morán as Elena
- Pilar Sen
- Francisco Jambrina
- María Eugenia Ríos
- Raúl Farell
