= Palito Ortega =

Argentine singer and actor (born 1941)

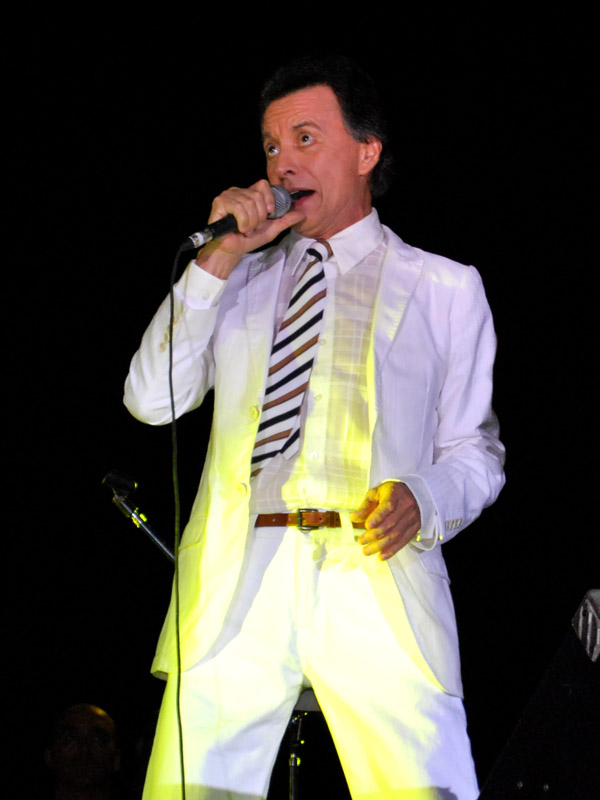

National Senator
- In office December 10, 1995 – December 10, 1999
- Constituency: Tucumán

Governor of Tucumán
- In office October 28, 1991 – October 28, 1995
- Vice Governor: Julio Díaz Lozano
- Preceded by: Julio César Aráoz
- Succeeded by: Antonio Domingo Bussi

Personal details
- Born: Ramón Bautista Ortega; February 28, 1941 (age 85) Lules, Argentina
- Party: Justicialist Party
- Spouse: Evangelina Salazar (m. 1967)
- Children: 6, including Julieta, Sebastián, Emanuel and Luis
- Profession: Musician

Ramón Bautista Ortega (Spanish pronunciation: [raˈmom bawˈtista oɾˈteɣa]; born February 28, 1941) is an Argentine singer and actor, better known as Palito Ortega (pronounced [paˈlito oɾˈteɣa]). Ortega is an icon of Argentine popular music, and is considered one of the main representatives of the musical style called New wave that marked the Hispanic-American music between the years '60 and '70. He reached international fame, particularly in Latin America and Spain, during the 1960s, when the rock en español style of rock and roll music was popularized among teenagers in the region.

== Biography ==
=== Youth ===
Ortega was born to a very poor family in Lules, and had to work from a young age, selling newspapers in San Miguel de Tucumán, and finding a job at a store. His real passion, however, was music, as he had been dreaming of becoming a singer since early childhood; as a teenager, Ortega was an admirer of Elvis Presley.

Ortega moved to Buenos Aires in 1956, where he sold coffee in the city's parks, corners, and streets. He used his work as a coffee seller to get into show business by setting up a coffee-selling spot near Buenos Aires' Channel Seven Public Television station. This worked well for Ortega, as many entertainers would stop by to buy coffee from his stand, and he became acquainted with some of the best known Argentine rock musicians of the era. Ortega also worked near Radio Belgrano, where many of the singers he met while selling coffee near the television station would recognize him and form a bond with the young star in the making.

Ortega became friends with members of a famous group called "Carlinhos y su Banda". He learned to play drums during band practice sessions, eventually joining the group. A period of wild success across South America followed for the band, with Ortega being one of their most popular members. Ortega left the group to follow a solo career, confident that the recognition the group had given him would guarantee him success as a solo artist.

=== Career in entertainment ===
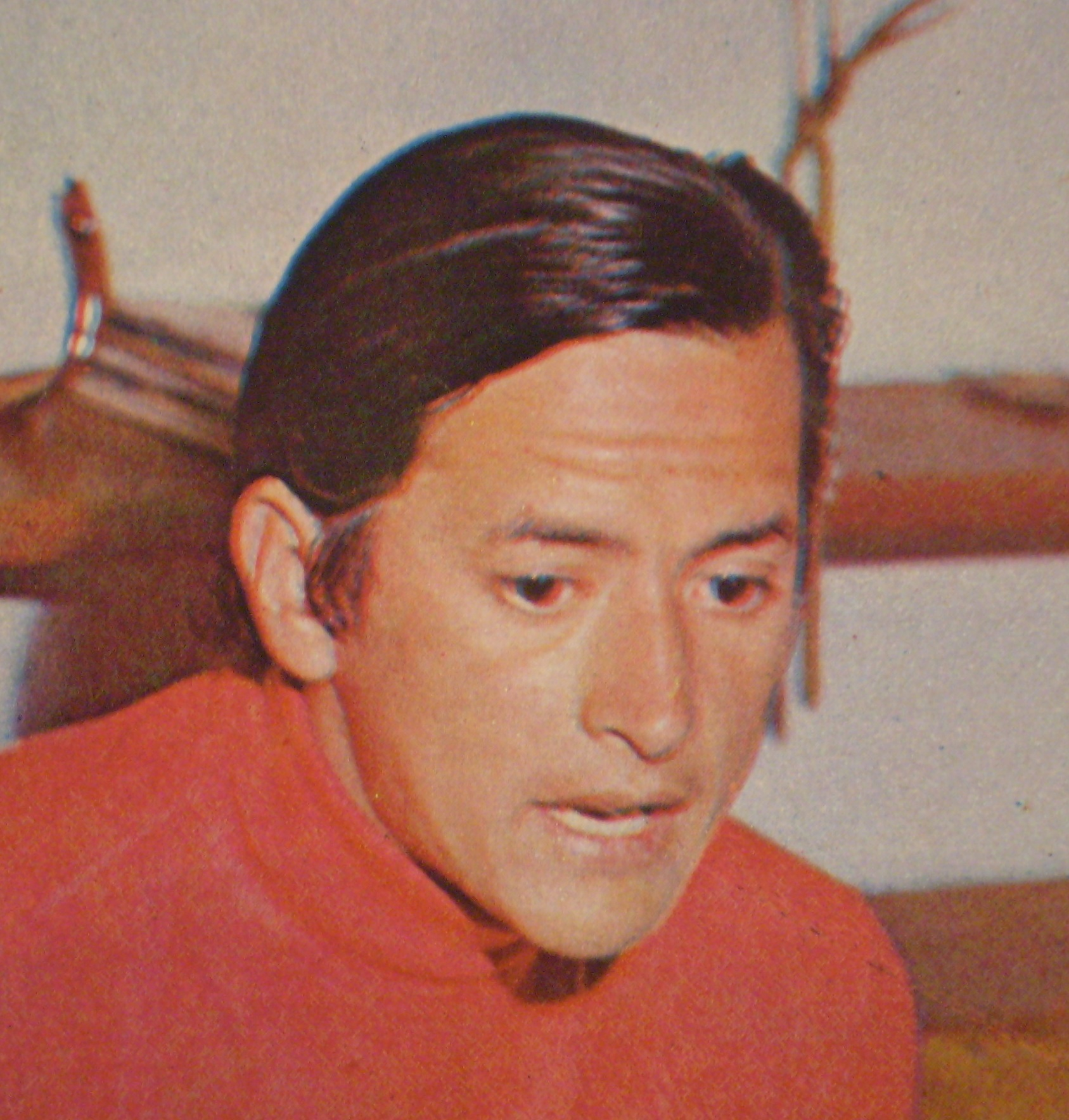
Ortega performing in 1970

His first solo album, La Edad del Amor ("The Age of Love"), was recorded under the artistic name of Nery Nelson. This album, as well as the next one (Yo no Quiero, translated to "I Don't Want To"), were not hits. Both albums were recorded in Mendoza with low budgets and no recording company to back them up. Ortega also used the artistic nickname of Tony Varano for some of his live shows at the time, and he became a member of "The Lyons" when the Argentine rock legend, lead singer Peter Rock, left the band. His interests, however, remained in being a successful solo singer, and he left The Lyons within months of joining that band.

Ortega met songwriter Dino Ramos in 1962; this would prove important in Ortega's career as Ramos would write a large number of Ortega's hits. By 1963, in the midst of Argentina's own "new wave" (La nueva ola) movement (similar to those in the United States and many other countries), Ortega began to become a television regular, as he was featured multiple times on a popular Canal 11 show of the time, Club del Clan ("The Clan Club") along with Cachita Galán; the word clan in Spanish has nothing to do with racist groups; "clan" has the same meaning as "group" in Spanish.

In 1963, he signed with RCA Records, and began recording immediately. His television appearances led to a career in cinema. Ortega recorded 27 albums, and starred in 26 films at the time, becoming a teen idol as a consequence. He acted and sang in those films, and shared the big screen with many of Argentina's most important actors and actresses of the time. His fame acquainted him with Evangelina Salazar, a television actress known for her role as a country schoolteacher; the couple were married in 1967, and had six children.

Palito Ortega would travel extensively through the rest of the 1960s and the 1970s. He went on to record for RCA in Mexico, Italy, England, and Nashville, Tennessee. In 1966 while in Nashville, Palito Ortega recorded the hit song "Sombras" by music composer and visual artist Gil Veda. Ortega's status as a teen idol declined during that period, and he reduced his television and movie appearances, as well as his album recordings. He did, however, become a successful music promoter, and in August 1981, produced a show for Frank Sinatra in Argentina. The sharp devaluation of the peso following the collapse of Economy Minister José Alfredo Martínez de Hoz's exchange rate timetable made his US dollar-denominated contractual obligations unaffordable, however. Ortega reportedly lost one million dollars after paying the legendary crooner for his Luna Park Stadium show, and was forced to sell a significant portion of his estate.

Ortega relocated with his wife and six children to Miami in 1985, which by then was becoming a mecca for Latino entertainers. Ortega joined the likes of Iris Chacón, Charytín, Celia Cruz, Gloria Estefan, Julio Iglesias and others as a resident of the south Florida city. Ortega sang the United States national anthem before the 1986 world middleweight championship boxing fight between Marvin Hagler and John Mugabi.

=== Politics and retirement ===
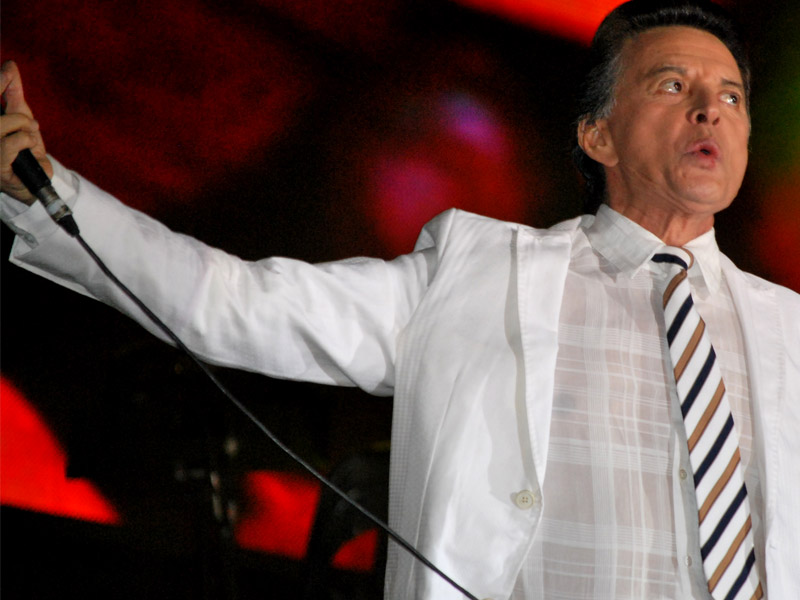
Ortega performing at a musical revival in 2009

Ortega retired from show business for a while after that, focusing on his career as a businessman and eyeing a career as a politician. Two of his children (son Emanuel and daughter Julieta) followed in their father's footsteps as entertainers, and, with Emanuel moving to Mexico, Ortega decided to return to Argentina. He was elected Governor of Tucumán Province in 1991, narrowly defeating former military Governor Antonio Domingo Bussi. One of his brothers, Juan, supported Bussi, though another brother, Luis, was elected Mayor of General Sarmiento (a suburb of Buenos Aires).

Ortega governed as a close ally of President Carlos Menem. Aligned with Menem's free market policies, he privatized the Bank of Tucumán and the Provincial Water Authority, moves which cost him approval. The Vice-Governor, Julio Díaz, broke with Ortega, and in 1993 accused the governor of ordering politically motivated investigations of students and labor union officials; Constitutionally ineligible to run for re-election in 1995, Ortega was instead elected to the Argentine Senate. The Justicialist Party nominated him for the Vice-Presidency in 1999, but his party lost the general elections that year.

Ortega left politics, and in 2002, began to tour as a singer again.

== See also ==
- List of best-selling Latin music artists
