= El Santo de la Espada =

1970 film

- English: The Saint of the Sword
- Directed by: Leopoldo Torre Nilsson
- Written by: Beatriz Guido; Ulises Petit de Murat; Luis Pico Estrada; Ricardo Rojas; Leopoldo Torre Nilsson
- Produced by: Marcelo Simonetti; Leopoldo Torre Nilsson
- Starring: Alfredo Alcón; Evangelina Salazar; Lautaro Murúa; Ana María Picchio; Héctor Alterio
- Cinematography: Aníbal Di Salvo
- Edited by: Antonio Ripoll
- Music by: Ariel Ramírez
- Production company: Producciones Maipú
- Distributed by: Contracuadro
- Release date: 25 March 1970 (Argentina)
- Running time: 120 minutes
- Country: Argentina
- Language: Spanish

El Santo de la Espada (in English, The Saint of the Sword) is a 1970 Argentine historical epic film directed by Leopoldo Torre Nilsson and starring Alfredo Alcón. It narrates the life of José de San Martín. It was written by Beatriz Guido and Luis Pico Estrada, based on the eponymous novel by Ricardo Rojas. The script was supervised by the Sanmartinian National Institute.

The film was very successful at its country's box office, and it is the most successful biopic about "El Libertador" San Martín, although it received some negative reviews due to historical inaccuracies.

== Synopsis ==
The story relates the life and career of José de San Martín during the South American wars of independence. It starts with his return to Mendoza province, with the rest of the narration being told as a flashback.

== Cast ==
- Alfredo Alcón as José de San Martín
- Evangelina Salazar as Remedios de Escalada
- Lautaro Murúa as Bernardo O'Higgins
- Ana María Picchio
- Héctor Alterio as Simón Bolivar
- Héctor Pellegrini
- Alfredo Iglesias
- Mario Casado
- Walter Soubrié
- Fernando Lewiz
- Onofre Lovero
- Miguel Bermúdez
- Juan Carlos Lamas
- Diego Varzi
- Aldo Barbero
- Eduardo Pavlovsky
- Leonor Benedetto
- Eduardo Humberto Nóbili
- Rodolfo Brindisi
- Luis Manuel de la Cuesta
- Carlos Lucini
- Miguel Herrera
- Marcelo Miró
- Hugo Arana
- Ramón Cas
- Carlos Davis
- Rubén Green
- José Slavin
- Leonor Manso
- Alejo Patricio López Lecube
- Mercedes Sosa

== History ==
The role of San Martín was played by Alfredo Alcón, and Evangelina Salazar also starred as Remedios de Escalada, San Martin's wife. Other important actors in Argentina's film history also appeared in central roles, including Lautaro Murúa, Héctor Alterio and Alfredo Iglesias; Leonor Benedetto, Rubén Green and Hugo Arana were novice actors by that time, and eventually developed notable careers afterwards.

Most of the film was made in the south of the province of Mendoza, starting by the end of 1968. Some relevant parts of San Martín's life were not covered: The battles of San Martín in Spain are not included, starting instead with his arrival to Buenos Aires and the First Triumvirate requesting him to create the Regiment of Mounted Grenadiers.

San Martín's relationship with Remedios de Escalada receives extended coverage in the film's plot, but with an important fact left unattended: after the emancipation of Chile and Peru, San Martín resigns to his powers in Peru after his meeting with Simon Bolivar in the Guayaquil conference; he then returns to Mendoza upon receiving a letter that informed him of the grave illness of Remedios. When San Martín arrived at Mendoza, he found out that Remedios had already died.

The film premiered in Mendoza on March 25, 1970, and quickly became a blockbuster. A few months later, a group of revisionists created a documental movie about San Martín, in an effort to make clear some events the film narrated.

Conductor Pedro Ignacio Calderón contributed to the film.

== See also ==
- José de San Martín
