= Black Box (2002 film) =

- Theatrical release poster
- Directed by: Luis Ortega
- Written by: Luis Ortega
- Produced by: Miriam Bendjuia; Mariano Fernández
- Starring: Dolores Fonzi; Eugenia Bassi
- Cinematography: Luis Ortega
- Edited by: César Custodio
- Music by: Leandro Chiappe
- Distributed by: Bodega Films
- Release dates: April 27, 2002 (Buenos Aires International Festival of Independent Cinema); August 15, 2002 (Argentina)
- Running time: 81 minutes
- Country: Argentina
- Language: Spanish

Black Box (Spanish: La caja negra) is a 2002 Argentine film, written and directed by Luis Ortega. The film stars Dolores Fonzi, Eugenia Bassi, and others.

== Plot ==
The film tells of the relationships in a dysfunctional family.

Dorotea (Dolores Fonzi) is a young girl in her teens who works in a laundry and takes care of her grandmother (Eugenia Bassi) she lives with.

Her father, Eduardo (Eduardo Couget), is released from prison.

Eduardo is indigent and stricken with Parkinsons and lives in the Salvation Army shelter and panhandles from passing motorists as well.

Dorotea becomes Eduardo's caregiver.

== Cast ==
- Dolores Fonzi as Dorotea
- Eugenia Bassi as Abuela
- Eduardo Couget as Padre
- Silvio Bassi as Silvio

== Distribution ==
The film was first presented at the Buenos Aires International Festival of Independent Cinema on April 27, 2002 in Buenos Aires. It opened wide in Argentina on August 15, 2002.

The film was screened at many film festivals, including: the Donostia-San Sebastián International Film Festival, Spain; the International Filmfest Mannheim-Heidelberg, Germany; the Philadelphia International Film Festival, United States; the Karlovy Vary Film Festival, Czech Republic; and others.

== Awards ==
=== Wins ===
- Mannheim-Heidelberg International Filmfestival: Special Mention, Luis Ortega; 2002.
- Mar del Plata Film Festival: SIGNIS Award - Special Mention, Luis Ortega; Special Jury Award, Luis Ortega; 2002.
- Fribourg International Film Festival, Switzerland: Don Quixote Award; Luis Ortega; E-Changer Award, Luis Ortega; Special Jury Award, Luis Ortega; 2003.

=== Nominations ===
- Viña del Mar Film Festival, Chile: Grand Paoa, Luis Ortega; 2002.
- Argentine Film Critics Association Awards: Silver Condor; Best Actress, Dolores Fonzi; Best First Film, Luis Ortega; Best New Actor, Eduardo Couget; 2003.
