= El amor tiene cara de mujer (Argentine TV series) =

Argentine television series

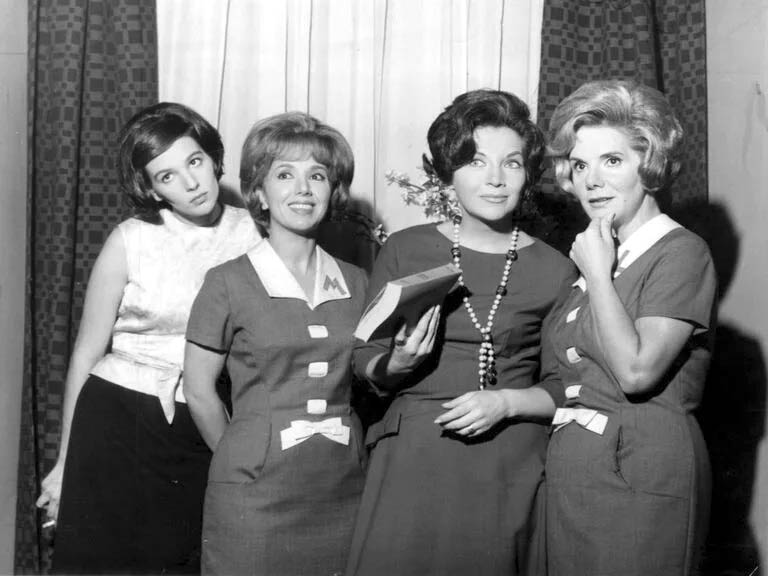
- The main cast, ftlr: Bárbara Mujica, Angélica López Gamio, Delfy de Ortega, Iris Laínez
- Genre: Telenovela
- Created by: Nené Cascallar
- Directed by: Edgardo Borda; Osias Wilenski
- Starring: Delfy de Ortega; Angélica López Gamio; Bárbara Mujica; Iris Láinez; Claudia Lapacó
- Country of origin: Argentina
- Original language: Spanish
- No. of seasons: 7
- No. of episodes: 800

Production
- Executive producer: Jacinto Pérez Heredia
- Production locations: Buenos Aires, Federal District, Argentina
- Cinematography: Enrique Zanini; Jorge Vede
- Running time: 30 minutes

Original release
- Network: Canal 13
- Release: 1964 – 1970

Related
- El amor tiene cara de mujer (1971)

El amor tiene cara de mujer is an Argentine telenovela produced by Jacinto Pérez Heredia for Canal 13 and Canal 9 in 1964.

== Plot ==
The telenovela follows the lives of four women (Bárbara Mujica, Iris Láinez, Delfy de Ortega and Angélica López Gamio) who work in a beauty institute. They are of different ages, social stratums, and lifestyles. Each week, the show is dedicated one woman to allow for the participation of a larger cast. The telenovela aired for seven seasons, until it ended in 1970. To withdraw from the cast Bárbara Mujica, was incorporated in principle to Thelma Biral, and then joined the plot a fifth protagonist, a role that was played in some seasons by Claudia Lapacó and others by Silvina Rada.

== Cast ==
- Delfy de Ortega as Vanessa Lertó
- Angélica López Gamio as Matilde
- Bárbara Mujica as Marcela
- Evangelina Salazar as Betina
- Iris Láinez as Laura
- Claudia Lapacó
- Norma Aleandro
- Norma Alexander
- Ricardo Aliaga
- Arnaldo André
- Mariana Karr
- Jorge Barreiro
- Martha Barrios
- Ricardo Bauleo
- Miguel Bebán
- Zulema Speranza

== Versions ==
- In 1966 performed a version of this soap opera, called in Brazil, O amor tem cara de mulher.
- In 1971, Televisa performed this soap opera under the same name, Starring by Silvia Derbez, Irma Lozano, Irán Eory and Lucy Gallardo.
- In 1973, it took to film in Mexico, directed by Tito Davidson.
- In 1976, an Argentine version was made with Virginia Lago, Cristina Tejedor, Beatriz Día Quiroga, Dora Prince and Christian Bach.
- In 1984, was repeated again in Mexico with the title of Principessa.
- In 1994, Televisa performed this soap opera under the same name, Starring by Thelma Biral, Marita Ballesteros, Laura Novoa, Marcelo Alfaro and Laura Flores.
- In 2007, a renewed version titled was made Palabra de mujer.
