= Mariana (1970 TV series) =

Mexican telenovela

- Genre: Telenovela
- Country of origin: Mexico
- Original language: Spanish

Original release
- Network: Telesistema Mexicano
- Release: 1970

Mariana is a Mexican telenovela produced by Televisa and transmitted by Telesistema Mexicano in 1970.

== Cast ==
- Irma Lozano as Mariana
- Enrique Aguilar
- Socorro Avelar
- Ada Carrasco
- Ana Dublan
