= Palabra de mujer (TV series) =

- Genre: Telenovela; Romance; Drama
- Created by: Nené Cascallar
- Written by: Jesús Calzada; Gabriel Briceño; Alejandro Pohlenz; Janely Lee; Vanesa Varela
- Directed by: Benjamín Cann; Eric Morales; Salvador Sánchez
- Starring: Edith González; Yadhira Carrillo; Ludwika Paleta; Lidia Ávila; Juan Soler
- Opening theme: Ella performed by Bebe
- Country of origin: Mexico
- Original language: Spanish
- No. of episodes: 145

Production
- Executive producer: José Alberto Castro
- Producers: Ernesto Hernández; Fausto Sáinz
- Production locations: Filming; Televisa San Ángel; Mexico City, Mexico; Locations; Mexico City, Mexico
- Cinematography: Ernesto Arreola; Lino Adrián Gama Esquinca; Karlos Velázquez; Carlos Sánchez Ross
- Camera setup: Multi-camera
- Running time: 41-44 minutes
- Production company: Televisa

Original release
- Network: Canal de las Estrellas
- Release: October 22, 2007 – May 9, 2008

Related
- El amor tiene cara de mujer (1971-1973) Principessa (1984-1986)

Palabra de mujer (English: A Woman's Word) is a Mexican telenovela produced by José Alberto Castro for Televisa in 2007. Is a remake of Mexican telenovelas El amor tiene cara de mujer and Principessa.

On Monday, October 22, 2007, Canal de las Estrellas started broadcasting Palabra de mujer weekdays at 6:00pm, replacing Amor sin maquillaje. The last episode was broadcast on ended on Friday, May 9, 2008 with Querida enemiga replacing it the following Monday.

Edith González, Yadhira Carrillo, Ludwika Paleta, Lidia Ávila, Juan Soler, Alejandro de la Madrid, Rafael Puente Jr. and Lisardo starred as protagonists, while Cynthia Klitbo, Víctor Noriega and Agustín Arana starred as antagonists.

== Plot ==
Palabra de Mujer follows the interconnected lives of four women from varied social backgrounds in Mexico City: Vanesa, Fernanda, Paulina and Matilde, all of whom work for a production company that is producing a television talk show that shares the same name as the series.

The plot begins as Vanesa approaches a female friend, Delia, to help her establish a production company to produce quality programming for women with Fernanda, Paulina, Matilde and Irmita supporting the business venture. The television program they seek to produce becomes the motivation that Vanesa needs to rebuild her life after Julian, her husband of 22 years, left her for a younger woman. Vanesa lives with her two children, Clara and Emiliano, who are ignorant of the fact that many of the marital woes experienced by their mother and father were because they lost their first son 20 years earlier while vacationing in Spain. Since Neither Vanesa nor Julian have never truly recovered the loss of their first son, their separation has proven even more painful as it has served as a reminder of their past tragedy. Early in the story, Martin, a life long friend of Vanesa's becomes an enduring source of love and support for her, hardening tensions between herself and Clara, who is still lovingly devoted to her father.

Paulina, on the other hand, has had a relatively easy life considering she was raised in a wealthy family. However, she is still troubled at her parents' recent divorce. Though she is single and living with her embittered aunt, her life changes dramatically when she pardons her father and moves to live with him and his new wife, Flora. She is welcomed enthusiastically by her new stepmother, but quickly finds that her stepbrother Adrián is less than enthusiastic about her, which is due primarily to the fact that he has a growing distrust of her father. The two eventually put tensions aside as they find they share more than contempt for one another, and the flames of passion ignite.

Fernanda lives alone with her teenage daughter, Bety, who also serves as her mother's best friend. Fernanda's husband Emanuel, Bety's father, left her to marry a wealthier woman. However, Fernanda's luck changes when she meets Hernán, a rugged adventurer with lingering commitment issues. Though he has lived life by his own rules, he strives to make a new life with her.

Matilde is the creative genius who, though she hails from humbler origins (her father is a mechanic and her mother works in the market), balances her new professional life with her recent marriage to Robert, Delia's son.

The series roughly follows the balance between the personal and professional lives of the four main characters. A common plot device in the program is how the women leverage professional success to gain control of personal lives that have spiraled out of control.

== Cast ==
=== Main ===
- Edith González as Vanesa Noriega Blanco de Medina
- Yadhira Carrillo as Fernanda Ortiz Barquín de Gil
- Ludwika Paleta as Paulina Álvarez y Junco Navarro
- Lidia Ávila as Matilde Solano Mellado de Landeta
- Cynthia Klitbo as Delia Ibarra Perfecta Vda. de Landeta
- Juan Soler as Martín Castellanos
- Víctor Noriega as Emanuel San Román
- Lisardo as Hernán Gil
- Rafael Puente Jr. as Roberto "Betito" Landeta Ibarra
- Alejandro de la Madrid as Adrian Vallejo Navarro
- Agustín Arana as Julián Medina

=== Supporting ===
- Dalilah Polanco as Irma López
- Otto Sirgo as Mariano Álvarez y Junco
- Yula Pozo as Doña Rosa de Solano
- Roberto Ballesteros as Genaro Arreola
- Julio Bracho as Germán Mondragón
- Monserrat Oliver as Monserrat
- Claudia Godinez as Gina San Román
- Jessica Coch as María Inés Castrejón
- Margarita Isabel as Consuelo Perfecta Vda. de Ibarra
- Irma Lozano as Carlota Navarro Vda. Álvarez y Junco
- Salvador Sánchez as Don Guadalupe "Lupe" Solano
- Amairani as Sonia de San Román
- Jacqueline Voltaire as Flora Navarro de Álvarez y Junco
- Eugenio Cobo as Armando Longoria
- Dolores Salomon "Bodokito" as Benita
- Miguel Loyo as Ismael Solano
- Antonio de la Vega as Saúl
- Carolina Jaramillo as Tamara
- Kendra Santacruz as Clara Medina Noriega
- Natalia Telléz as Beatriz "Bety" Ortiz
- Osvaldo de León as Ariel Castellanos
- Alberich as Emiliano Medina Noriega
- Alejandro Nones as Octavio Longoria
- Úrsula Montserrat as Silvia Longoria
- Daniel Berlanga as Jorge "Danny" Medina Noriega
- Jéssica Mas as Mireya Aranda
- Roxana Rojo de la Vega as Erika Valtierra

== Awards ==
Year	Award	Category	Nominee	Result
2009	27th TVyNovelas Awards	Best Actor	Juan Soler	Nominated
2009	27th TVyNovelas Awards	Best Antagonist Actress	Cynthia Klitbo	Nominated
2009	27th TVyNovelas Awards	Best Co-lead Actor	Agustín Arana	Nominated
2009	27th TVyNovelas Awards	Best Male Revelation	Osvaldo de León	Nominated
