= Renata Flores (actress) =

Mexican actress (1949–2024)

Marta Sylvia "Renata" Flores (28 August 1949 – 9 February 2024) was a Mexican actress and singer. She was best known for her participation in a number of Televisa-produced telenovelas, usually as a villain. Flores died from cancer on 9 February 2024, at the age of 74.

== Career ==
In 1964, at the age of 14, Flores made her debut as a rock singer. One of her songs, "Mi Novio Juan" ("My Boyfriend Juan") became a major hit for the then young singer. "Mi Novio Juan" was a Spanish-cover version of the major English hit, "My Boyfriend's Back". Her other major hit was "Mi novio esquimal" ("My Eskimo Boyfriend"), which itself was also a cover of another popular English rock song, this time of "My Boy Lollipop". Her friend, Jorge Ortiz de Pinedo, later remembered her as "The Gloria Trevi of their era", a person "with wild hair and broken socks".

Flores experimented as a theater actress, until she finally had an acting breakthrough when she began participating in some Televisa telenovelas, as a teen-aged villain in "Gente sin historia" ("People Without a Story"), which brought her fame in Mexico. She followed that initial success with a participation in another teen-oriented telenovela, "Juventud, divino tesoro" ("Youth, Divine Treasure"), acting, again, as a teen-aged villain in the latter.

From there on, her television acting career took off. She participated in many telenovelas, some of which were shown internationally in Latin America, the United States and further abroad. Among her credits were "Chispita", 1987's "Rosa Salvaje" (where she opposed star Verónica Castro), "La usurpadora" ("The Usurper"), the children's oriented telenovela "Carita de ángel" ("Angel Face"), the Children's oriented telenovela "Vivan los niños" ("Long Live the Children"), the teen-oriented musical telenovela "Rebelde" ("Rebel", in which she acted opposite Spanish pop-rock band RBD) and many others.

== Later life and death ==
Despite earning a good living as an actress, Flores eventually lost her savings. She became homeless and lived in a car and on the streets of Mexico City with some dog friends, until she asked for, and was provided with, assistance by the Mexican institution, Casa del Actor, which provided her with a home and with basic needs beginning in 2020.

She died of cancer on 9 February 2024 in Mexico City.

== See also ==
- List of Mexicans
