= Principessa =

Mexican television series

- Genre: Telenovela; Romance; Drama
- Created by: Nené Nascallar
- Written by: Carlos Romero
- Directed by: Pedro Damián; Gastón Tuset; Rafael Banquells
- Starring: Irán Eory; Angélica Aragón; Anabel Ferreira; Rogelio Guerra; Saby Kamalich; Alma Muriel
- Country of origin: Mexico
- Original language: Spanish
- No. of episodes: 398

Production
- Executive producer: Valentín Pimstein
- Cinematography: Manuel Ruiz Esparza
- Production company: Televisa

Original release
- Network: Canal de las Estrellas
- Release: September 24, 1984 – April 4, 1986

Related
- El amor tiene cara de mujer (1964); O amor tem cara de mulher (1966); El amor tiene cara de mujer (1971); El amor tiene cara de mujer (1976); El amor tiene cara de mujer (1994); Palabra de mujer (2007)

Principessa (English title: Princess) is a Mexican telenovela produced by Valentín Pimstein for Televisa in 1984. The telenovela about the adventures and misadventures of a group of friends Paola, Fernanda, Marisela and Adriana working as stylists in the salon "Princess".

It starred Irán Eory, Angélica Aragón, Alma Muriel, Hilda Aguirre, Cecilia Camacho and Anabel Ferreira.

== Cast ==
- Irán Eory as Paola Santander
- Angélica Aragón as Fernanda Montenegro (#1)
- Alma Muriel as Fernanda Montenegro (#2)
- Hilda Aguirre as Fernanda Montenegro (#3)
- Cecilia Camacho as Marisela Monteagudo
- Anabel Ferreira as Adriana Elgeta
- Rogelio Guerra as Santiago Pérez
- Gregorio Casal as Leonardo Guerra
- Saby Kamalich as Paulina Ballmer del Prado Sán Millán
- Carlos Cámara as Máximo Torres
- Javier Ruan as Eduardo López
- Germán Robles as Ramiro Huelga
- Manuel Saval as Reynaldo Cevallos (#1)
- Gerardo Paz as Reynaldo Cevallos (#2)
- Álvaro Cerviño as Daniel Martínez
- María Martín as Rocio Montesinos del Valle
- David Ostrosky as Juan Carlos Villanueva
- Surya MacGregor as Franchesca Olazábal
- Mónica Sánchez Navarro as Erika
- Gerardo Murguía as Rodrigo Fujimori
- Leticia Calderón as Vicky
- Arturo Peniche
- Luis Bayardo
- Christopher Lago
- Elsa Cárdenas as Felisa
- Dina de Marco as Virginia
- Virginia Gutiérrez
- José Elías Moreno as Julio César
- Janet Ruiz as Anita
- Jose Roberto Hill as Danilo
- Leonardo Daniel as Federico
- Stella Inda as Chole
- Rebeca Rambal as Marina
- July Furlong as Elina
- Alfonso Iturralde as Aníbal
- Arturo Guizar as Enrique
- Constantino Costas as Dr. Vargas
- Erika Magnus
- Otto Sirgo as Rodolfo
- Andrés Buenfil as Lisandro
- Luis Uribe as Gerardo
- Josefina Escobedo as Alcira
- Odiseo Bichir as Ismael
- Arlette Pacheco as Maripaz
- Juan Carlos Serrán as Emilio
- Roxana Saucedo as Cristina (#1)
- Cristina Rubiales as Cristina (#2)
- Lorena Rivero as Aurora
- Jorge Luke as Martín
- Servando Manzetti as Rubén
- Armando Calvo as Ramón
- Maripaz Banquells as Brenda
- Arturo Lorca as Otto
- Alejandro Tommasi as César
- Alejandro Landero as Casimiro
- Héctor Suárez Gomiz
- Enrique Barrera -Gustavo
- Adela Noriega as Alina

== Awards ==
Year	Award	Category	Nominee	Result
1986	4th TVyNovelas Awards	Best Young Lead Actor	Álvaro Cerviño	Nominated
1986	4th TVyNovelas Awards	Best Child Performance	Christopher Lago	Nominated
