= Sombras =

Studio album by Javier Solís
- Released: 1965
- Genres: Bolero, mariachi, ranchera
- Length: 33:41
- Label: CBS

Sombras is a studio album and a single of the title track from the Mexican singer Javier Solís. Released in 1965 on the CBS label, it was Solís' "most acclaimed album". Solís, who died the year after the album's release, was accompanied on the album by the Mariachi Jalisco de Pepe Villa and the Mariachi Los Mensajeros de J. Isabel Paredes.

The title track, "Sombras", also known as "Sombras Nada Más", took a famous tango song and turned it into a bolero. The song was also released as a single and became a gold record in 1965 after selling over 100,000 copies. It became Solís' trademark song. The song was later covered by numerous artists, including Rocío Dúrcal, Natalia Jiménez, Vicente Fernández, Héctor Lavoe, Luis Enrique, and Felipe Pirela.

In a 2024 ranking by music critics of the 600 greatest Latin albums, "Sombras" was ranked No. 106. In his review of the album, critic Julián Jiménez wrote: "He sings with a melancholy and a chilling lament that sends shivers down your spine."

== Track listing ==
Side A

1. "Sombras", also known as "Sombras Nada Más" (José María Contursi, Francisco Lomuto)
2. "Cada Vez (Ogni Volta) (Carlo Rossi, Robby Ferrante, Al Stillman)
3. "En mi Viejo San Juan" (Noel Estrada)
4. "Si Dios Me Quita la Vida" (Luis Demetrio)
5. "Ha Sabido que Te Amaba (Ho capito che ti amo) (L. Tenco, Gil Luaño, J. Guiu Clara)
6. "Renunciación" (Antonio Valdés Herrera)

Side B

1. "Cuando Calienta el Sol" (P. Rigual)
2. "Retirada" (José Alfredo Jiménez)
3. "Moliendo Café" (H. Blanco, José Manzo)
4. "Que Va!" (Fernando Z. Maldonado)
5. "Tu Voz" (Plus je t'entend's) (translated by A. Gil Jr., written by Alain Barrière)
6. "Amanecíe en tus Brazos" (José Alfredo Jiménez)
