= El medio pelo =

Mexican TV soap opera

- Genre: Telenovela
- Created by: Antonio González Caballero
- Directed by: Luis Aragón
- Starring: Magda Guzmán; Eric del Castillo
- Country of origin: Mexico
- Original language: Spanish

Production
- Executive producer: Carlos Bravo

Original release
- Network: Telesistema Mexicano
- Release: 1966

El medio pelo is a Mexican telenovela produced by Carlos Bravo for Telesistema Mexicano in 1966.

== Cast ==
- Magda Guzmán as Paz
- Eric del Castillo as Guadalupe Marcial
- Irma Lozano as Aurorita Pérez García
- Carlos Riquelme as Abundio
- Virginia Manzano
- Luis Manuel Pelayo
- Celia Manzano
- Jorge Ortiz de Pinedo
- Delia Magaña
- Pilar Sen
- María Eugenia Ríos
