= El amor tiene cara de mujer (Mexican TV series) =

Mexican soap opera

- Created by: Nené Cascallar
- Written by: Estela Calderón; Manuel Canseco Noriega
- Directed by: Fernando Wagner
- Starring: Silvia Derbez; Irán Eory; Irma Lozano; Lucy Gallardo
- Opening theme: "Morir de placer" by Paul Mauriat
- Country of origin: México
- Original language: Spanish
- No. of episodes: 760

Production
- Producer: Valentín Pimstein
- Production location: Mexico City

Original release
- Network: Teleprogramas Acapulco, SA
- Release: July 12, 1971 – February 1973

Related
- El amor tiene cara de mujer Principessa (1984); Palabra de mujer (2007)

El amor tiene cara de mujer (Love has a woman's face) is a Mexican soap opera, produced by Valentín Pimstein for Teleprogramas Acapulco, SA in 1971. Starring leading actresses Silvia Derbez, Irma Lozano, Irán Eory, and Lucy Gallardo, it features an original story by Nené Cascallar. It was the second longest Mexican telenovela in history. Since its inception on July 12, 1971, it maintained high ratings through 400 one-hour episodes (760 half-hour episodes, as Televisa accounted for the duration of their telenovelas at that time).

It is a remake of the Argentine telenovela El amor tiene cara de mujer, which aired between 1964–1970. It was one of the biggest TV hits of the 1960s, greatly influencing the masses. Produced by Channel 13 of Buenos Aires, it starred Bárbara Mujica, Iris Láinez, Delfy de Ortega, and Angélica López Gamio.

== Plot ==
The story features the lives of four women of different ages and social classes as they work while attending the prestigious Lucy Escala Institute of Beauty & Boutique. The women, Laura, Matilda, Vicky, and Lucy, cope with personal problems on a day-to-day basis, but also enjoy the joys of life and their friendship.

== Cast ==
- Silvia Derbez as Laura Valdez
- Irma Lozano as Matilde Suárez
- Irán Eory as Victoria "Vicky" Gallardo y Pimentel
- Lucy Gallardo as Lucy Escala
- Claudio Obregón as Pablo Landa
- Javier Marc as Fernando Ugalde
- Jorge Ortiz de Pinedo as Gustavo Artiaga
- María Eugenia Ríos as Consuelo de Suárez
- Rubén Rojo as Julio
- Miguel Córcega as Alberto
- Olga Breeskin as Milena del Real
- Julián Pastor as Emilio Suárez
- Carlos Cámara as Alfredo Bustamante
- Ana Lilia Tovar as Nerina Suárez
- Magda Haller as Amelia Landa
- Gloria Leticia Ortiz as Bertha Valdez
- Fernando Mendoza as Don Manuel Molnar
- María Douglas as Leticia Gallardo
- Daniela Rosen as María Inés Amescua
- Héctor Andremar as Dr. Diego Solares
- Carlos Becerril as Daniel Escala
- Antonio Medellín as Carlos García Iglesias
- Bety Catania as Nora Tovar de García Iglesias
- July Furlong as Cristina
- Estela Chacón as Lili Molnar/Esther
- Tere Grobois as Diana
- Enrique del Castillo as Lic. Restrepo
- Manolo Calvo as Dr. Villafañe
- Anel as Claudia
- Guillermo Aguilar as Hernán Guevara
- Antonio Raxel as Sr. Amescua
- Otto Sirgo as Julio
- Azucena Rodríguez as Clarissa
- Gerardo del Castillo as Arnoldo
- Carlos Monden as Eduardo
- Joaquín Cordero as Ernesto
- Jorge del Campo as Billy
- Josefina Escobedo as Tía Alcira
- Carlos Alberto Badías as Dr. Gay
- Aldo Monti as Abel Delacroix
- Gustavo Rojo as Cristián
- Olivia Michel as Dora Nesler
- Bertha Moss as Lucía
- Rafael del Río as César
- Lola Tinoco as María
- María Martín as Leonila
- Julio Monterde as Otón
- Octavio Galindo as Guillermo
- Pedro Damián as Aníbal
- Bárbara Gil as Sara
- Gilberto Roman as Reynaldo
