= Javier Solís =

Mexican singer (1931–1966)

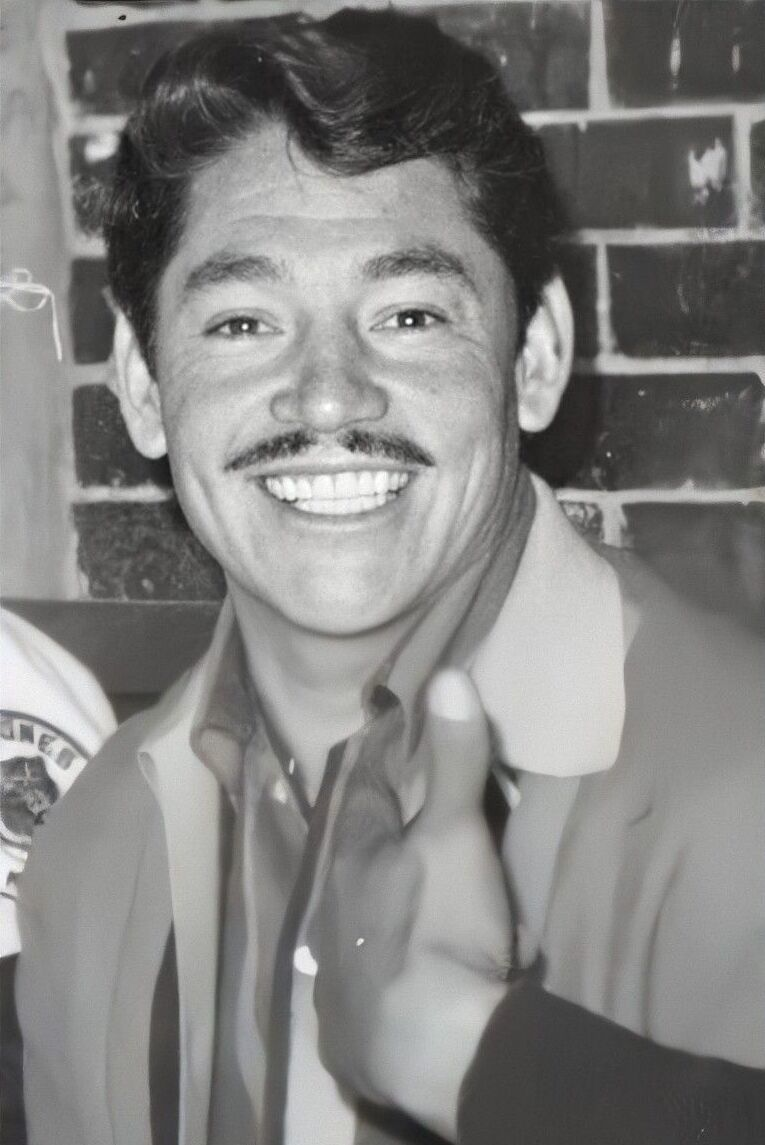
- Solís in 1966
- Born: Gabriel Siria Levario; 4 September 1931; Tacubaya, Mexico City, Mexico
- Died: 19 April 1966 (aged 34); Mexico City, Mexico
- Burial place: Panteón Jardín, Mexico City
- Other names: El Rey del Bolero Ranchero; Javier Luquín; La Voz de Terciopelo; El Señor de Sombras
- Occupations: Singer; actor
- Musical career
- Genres: Mariachi
- Instruments: Voice; guitar
- Years active: 1950–1966

Gabriel Siria Levario (4 September 1931 – 19 April 1966), known professionally as Javier Solís, was a Mexican singer and actor, specialized in the musical genres of bolero and ranchera.

His 1965 album Sombras has been ranked No. 106 by critics on their list of the greatest Latin albums of all time.

== Early life ==
Gabriel Siria Levario was the first of three children of Francisco Siria Mora, a baker and butcher, and Juana Levario Plata, a trader. Juana had a stall at a public market, and as her spouse had allegedly abandoned her, she had little time save for work. After a while, she decided to leave her son with the household of his uncle Valentín Levario Plata and his wife, Ángela López Martínez, whom Gabriel considered his real parents.

Gabriel attended primary school in Tacubaya in Mexico City, where he used to participate in singing contests. He had only completed five years of education when the death of his aunt Angela forced him to drop out of school to support his family. Gabriel first worked by collecting bones and glass. Later he worked in a supermarket transporting merchandise. He also worked as a baker, a butcher, a carpenter's helper, and a car washer. In his spare time he trained as an amateur boxer, with aspirations of going professional, but after suffering a few defeats he was urged to work at something "more decent".

== Singing career ==
Under the pseudonym of "Javier Luquín," Siria began singing in competitions in which the winner would be awarded a new pair of shoes. He was eventually banned from participating because he dominated the competition too much. At that time he was a butcher and sang while he worked. His boss, David Lara Ríos, heard him and was so impressed with his talent that he urged Solís to dedicate himself to music, recommending him to a voice coach, even paying for singing lessons with Noé Quintero.

At age 16 Siria went to Puebla to sing with the Mariachi Metepec, but he did not get his first professional break until two years later when Julito Rodríguez and Alfredo Gil, of the famous singing trio Los Panchos, discovered him and took him to audition at CBS Records. There in 1950 he signed a contract and recorded his first album. He was singing at the Teatro Lirico in Mexico City when he met dancer Blanca Estela Saenz, who would later become his wife. His first hit, "Llorarás, llorarás", came two years later, and it was his then producer Felipe Valdes Leal who gave Siria his stage name, Javier Solís.

Solís began to receive international acclaim in 1957 when he appeared in the United States and Central and South America. He was among the first artists to sing in the new style now known as bolero-ranchera. Boleros were typically associated with trio music, but his were now accompanied by mariachis. Solís was a versatile interpreter singing not only boleros, but also rancheras, corridos, danzones, waltzes, and tangos, among others. His hit recordings included "Sombras", "Payaso", "Vereda tropical", "En mi Viejo San Juan", and "Amanecí en tus brazos", the latter a cover of the hit written and recorded by José Alfredo Jiménez.

== Acting career ==
Solís started his acting career in 1959 and appeared in more than 20 films, working with such artists as Pedro Armendáriz, María Victoria, Antonio Aguilar, and Lola Beltrán. His final movie, Juan Pistolas, was completed in 1965, the same year that his film Sinful was released. During his lifetime he was considered a better singer than an actor by his public, rating him alongside the accomplished artists Jorge Negrete and Pedro Infante, who with Solís made up "Los Tres Gallos", or "The Three Roosters" of Mexican music and cinema.

== Final years and death ==
Following the 1957 death of Pedro Infante from a plane crash in Mérida, Yucatán, Solís experienced a surge of popularity, not least because he was considered the last of "The Three Roosters", the idols of Mexican music and cinema. Between 1961 and 1966 (the year of his death), he had twelve No. 1 hits on the Mexican charts.

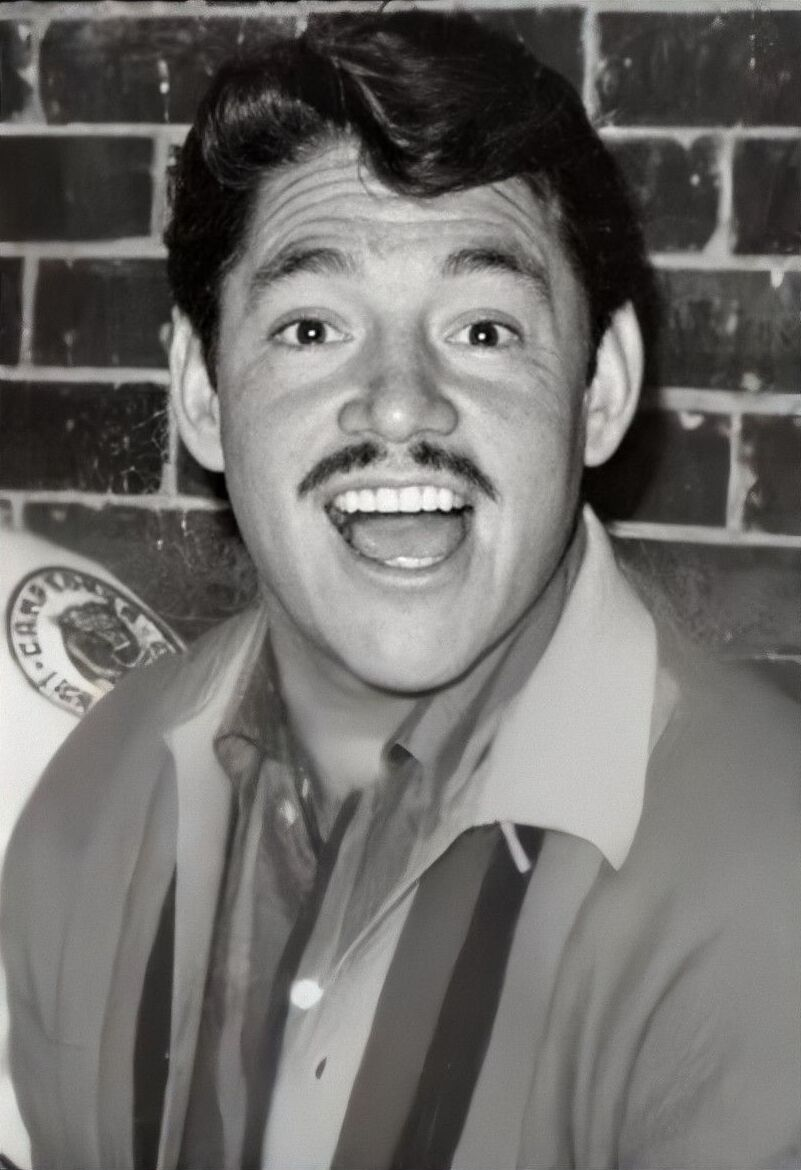
Solís in a photograph taken in April 1966, the month he died

On 12 April 1966 (only seven days before his death), Solís sang "Perdóname mi vida" live on a TV show, making visibly pained gestures during the performance. On 19 April 1966, Solís died at the age of 34 in Mexico City from complications due to gallbladder surgery. He is buried in the Panteón Jardín cemetery in Mexico City, Mexico.

== Legacy ==
Javier Solís was a produced many works, leaving an extensive discography, and like Infante, most of his albums are still in print.

== See also ==
- Recuerdo a Javier Solís
