= Nené Cascallar =

Argentine writer

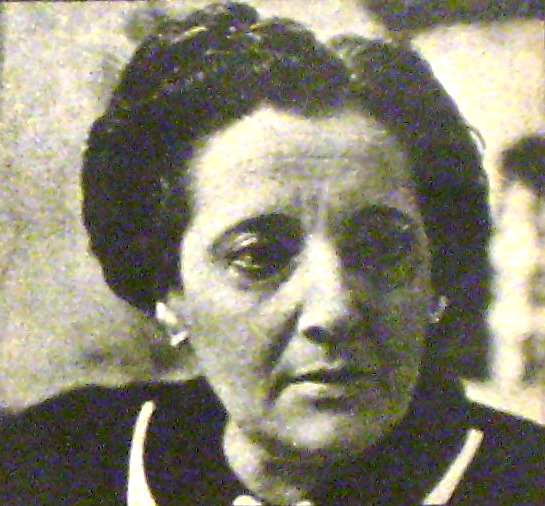
- Nené Cascallar
- Born: Alicia Inés Botto; June 11, 1914; Buenos Aires, Argentina
- Died: May 16, 1982 (aged 67); Buenos Aires, Argentia
- Occupations: Screenwriter, radio play writer
- Writing career
- Language: Spanish
- Genres: Screenwriting, film, radio

Alicia Inés Botto, better known by her pen name, Nené Cascallar (June 11, 1914, Buenos Aires – May 16, 1982, Buenos Aires) was an Argentine writer of radio plays and telenovelas. She wrote the screenplay of Fuego sagrado in 1950, and the book, A Lo Largo Del Camino, in 1951.

== Biography ==
Cascallar suffered from polio since the age of five, and used a wheelchair. She studied philosophy and literature before starting her career writing radio plays and then soap operas. A pioneer in the field, her work represented some of the country's biggest hits in the 1960s. She preferred to hand-pick the actors for each role which she wrote. El amor tiene cara de mujer, her greatest success, was remade in Mexico in 1971 and again with the title of Principessa in 1984. Cascallar's greatest successes also included Cuatro hombres para Eva (1966), Cuatro mujeres para Adán, Propiedad horizontal, and El cielo es para todos. Her work catapulted the careers of many Argentine actors, such as Rodolfo Bebán, Federico Luppi, Soledad Silveyra, Ana María Picchio, Norma Aleandro, Evangelina Salazar, Bárbara Mujica, Jorge Barreiro, Arnaldo André, Eduardo Rudy, Thelma Biral, Claudia Lapaco, Rodolfo Ranni, and others.

== Filmography ==
=== Films ===
- Cuatro en la frontera (1958)
- Malagueña (1956)
- Fuego sagrado (1950)

=== Television ===
- Principessa
- Vivir enamorada
- Los que ayudan a Dios
- Cuatro hombres para Eva
- El amor tiene cara de mujer
- El cielo es para todos

== See also ==
- Lists of writers
