= Irán Eory =

Iranian actor and model

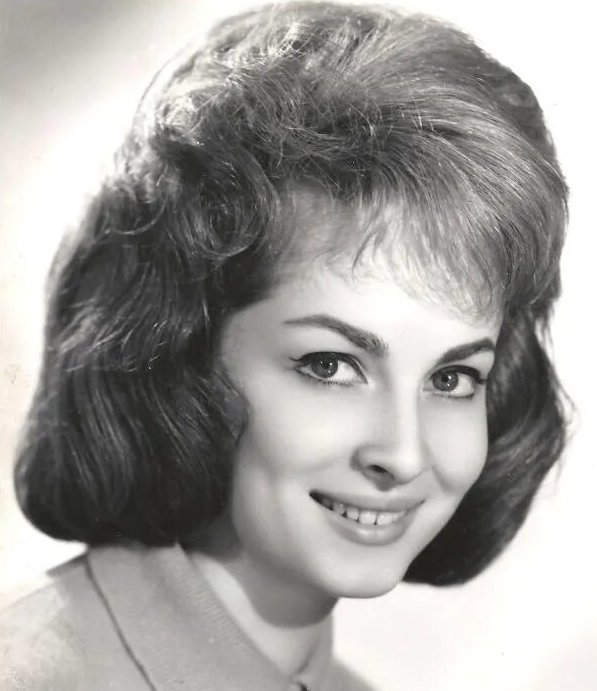
- Eory in 1961
- Born: Elvira Teresa Eory; 21 October 1937; Tehran, Iran
- Died: 10 March 2002 (aged 64); Mexico City, Mexico
- Citizenship: Austrian
- Occupation: Actress
- Years active: 1954–2002
- Partner: Carlos Monden

Elvira Teresa Eory (Persian: ایران اِئوری; 21 October 1937 – 10 March 2002), known by the stage name Irán Eory, was an Iranian-born Austrian actress. She achieved fame in Mexico after moving to that country in the late 1960s.

== Biography ==
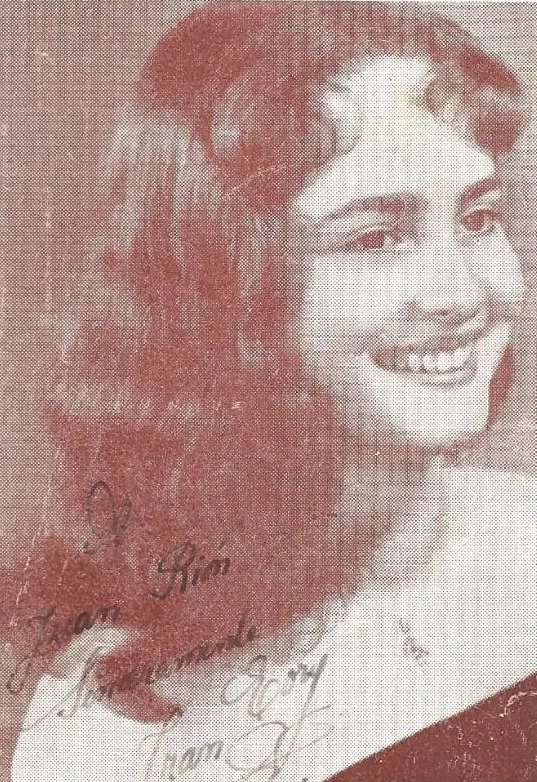
Eory c. 1950s

She was born on October 21, 1937 in Tehran, Iran, to an Austrian Jewish father who was a diplomat at the time whilst her mother — Angela Sidi — was of Iranian Jewish origins. Irán was given as the screen name for her, because it reflected her country of origin.

Eory was raised in Spain, where she learned Spanish, and entered a beauty contest in Monaco, where she was noticed by Prince Rainier. She started her acting career before emigrating to Mexico in the late 1960s, hoping to become an actress, singer, and a theatre producer.

Eory suffered a brain hemorrhage and she died at 64 in Mexico City on March 10, 2002, of embolism. Her ashes were entombed at the cemetery Panteón de Las Lomas located in Naucalpan, State of Mexico.

== Filmography ==
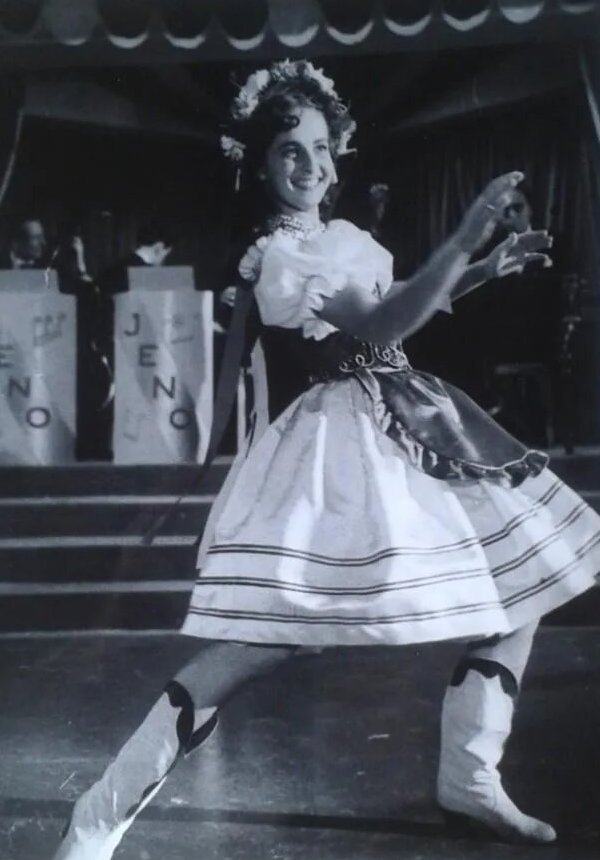
Eory in Los ases buscan la paz (1955)

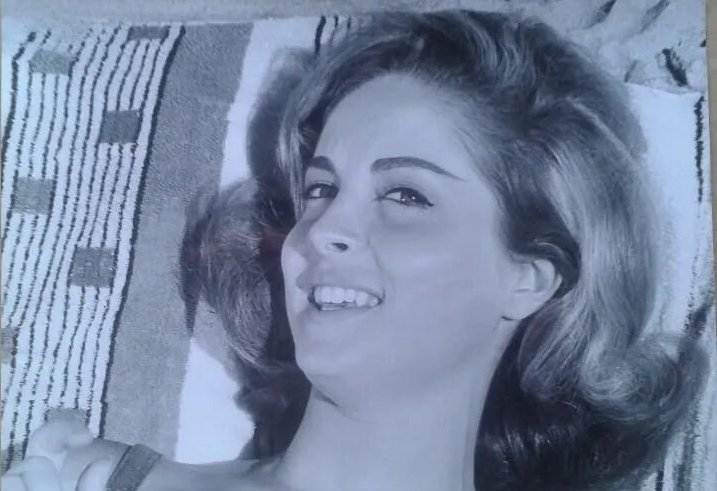
Eory in Una Chica Para Dos (1966)

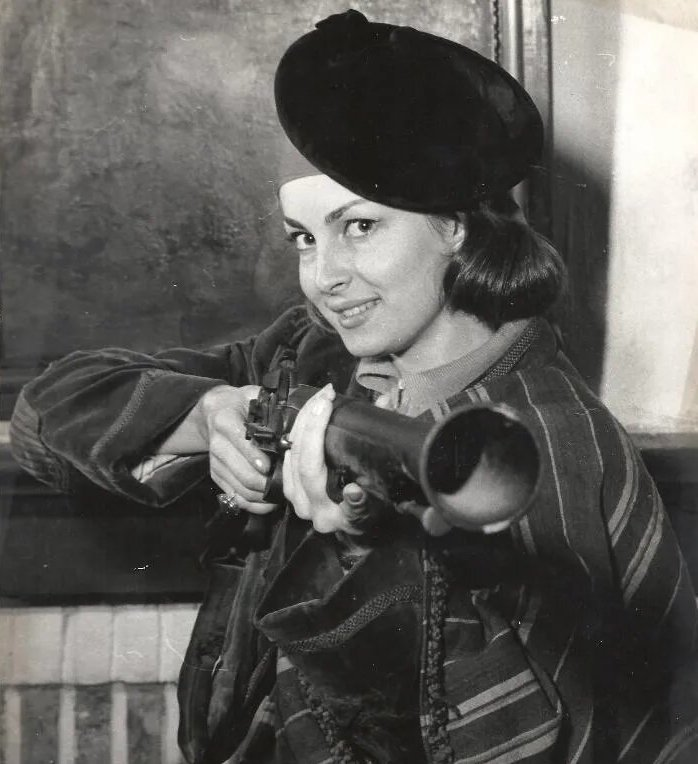
Eory c. 1960s

- The Devil Plays the Flute (1953) .... Eliza
- Tres huchas para Oriente (1954) .... Ana Hernández
- Kubala (1955) .... Erika
- Prohibido enamorarse (1961) .... Enfermera del doctor Bolt
- Fray Escoba (1961) .... Hermana Rosa
- Zorro the Avenger (1962) .... Amiga de Irene
- Acident 703 (1962) .... Luchy Altamira
- Sabían demasiado (1962) .... Empleada de la Compañía Aérea
- Vuelve San Valentín (1962) .... Amiga de Leonor
- Rogelia (1962) .... Nanette
- Esa pícara pelirroja (1963) .... Cantante 'Les feuilles mortes'
- Confidencias de un marido (aka Tercero Izquierda) (1963)
- Horror (aka The Blancheville Monster) (1963) .... Alice Taylor
- La máscara de Scaramouche (aka The Adventures of Scaramouche) (1963) .... Jacqueline - Pierrot's Girl-Friend
- Ensayo general para la muerte (1963) .... Franca
- The Fair of the Dove (1963) .... Casta / Merche
- Los muertos no perdonan (1963) .... Carmen Ayala
- Objetivo: las estrellas (1963) .... Coral
- Man of the Cursed Valley (1964) .... Gwen
- El pecador y la bruja (aka The Sinner and the Witch) (1964) .... Chica inglesa
- Chance at Love (1964) .... Sophie (segment "Une chance explosive")
- Aragonese Nobility' (1965) .... María del Pilar
- Misión Lisboa (aka Espionage in Lisbon) (1965) .... George's Lover
- Una chica para dos (1966) .... Mary
- El arte de no casarse (1966) .... Mari Carmen (1)
- Tre notti violente (aka Web of Violence) (1966) .... Lisa
- Las viudas (aka El aniversario) (1966) .... Sofía (segment "Luna de miel")
- ¿Qué hacemos con los hijos? (1967) .... Luisa Martínez
- Novios 68 (1967) .... Teresa, farmacéutica
- Los chicos con las chicas (1967) .... Marta
- No desearás la mujer de tu prójimo (1968) .... Lola
- Flash 18 (1968) .... Herself
- ¡Se armó el belén! (1969) .... Cari
- Muchacho (1970, featuring Sandro)
- Rubí (1970) .... Rubí
- Encrucijada (1970, TV Series) .... Susan Harrison
- El cielo y tú (1971) .... Suzana
- Las máscaras (1971, TV Series)
- El amor tiene cara de mujer (1971-1973, TV Series) .... Vicky Gallardo y Pimentel
- Entre dos amores (1972) .... Patricia O'Connor
- La justicia tiene doce años (1973) .... Guillermina
- Las tres perfectas casadas (1973) .... Genoveva
- El amor tiene cara de mujer (1973) .... Victoria Gallardo Pimentel / Vicky
- En busca de un muro (1974) .... Alma Reed
- El Hijo de Angela María (1974) .... Alicia Montalbán
- Mundo de juguete (1974, TV Series) .... Tía Mercedes Balboa
- The Children of Sanchez (1978) .... (uncredited)
- Domenica Montero (1978, TV Series) .... Domenica Montero
- Rosángela (1979, TV Series) .... Rosángela
- Barcelona sur (1981) .... Carla
- El último kamikaze (1983) .... Mónica
- Principessa (1984, TV Series) .... Paola
- En carne propia (1990, TV Series) .... Susana Tamaris
- Cuando llega el amor (1990, TV Series) .... Rosalía
- La pícara soñadora (1991, TV Series) .... Doña Marcelina Rochild
- Carrusel de las Américas (1992, TV Series) .... Doña Marcelina Rochild
- Entre la vida y la muerte (1993, TV Series) .... Aída de Trejos
- Prisionera de amor (1994, TV Series) .... Eloisa
- El vuelo del águila (1994, TV Series) .... Agustina de Romero Rubio
- María la del Barrio (1995, TV Series) .... Victoria Montenegro de De la Vega
- Esmeralda (1997, TV Series) .... Sor Piedad
- Sin ti (1997, TV Series) .... Mercedes
- La Usurpadora (1998, TV Series) .... Lourdes
- Gotita de amor (1998, TV Series) .... Madre Superiora
- Por tu amor (1999, TV Series) .... Mama Paz
- Por un beso (2000, TV Series) .... Carmen
- Aventuras en el tiempo (2001, TV Series) .... Old Violeta (final appearance)

== See also ==
- List of Iranianactresses
