= Sonia López =

Mexican singer and actress

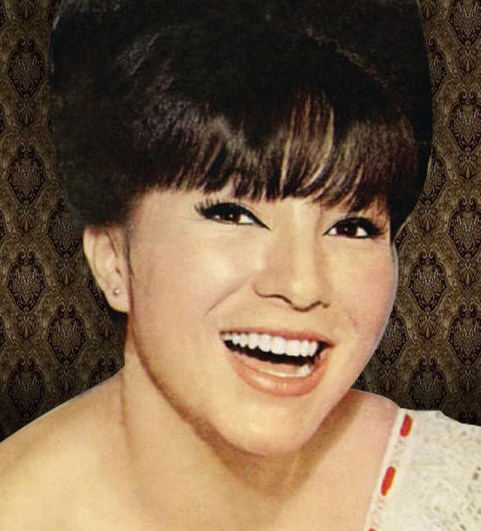
Sonia López

Asmindia Sonia López Valdés (born January 11, 1946) is a Mexican actress and singer, specialized in the genres of tropical music, bolero and cumbia, popular in the 1960s for several hits. Known as "La Chamaca de Oro", she was best known for hits such as Corazón de Acero, El Ladrón, El Nido, Canela Pura, De México a La Habana, Mi caprichito, and her early work with Sonora Santanera. She was part of the last stage of the Golden Age of Mexican cinema.

== Beginnings and successes with Sonora Santanera ==
At the age of 15, Sonia recorded the album Sonora Santanera canta Sonia López (released, 1962) with Sonora Santanera. The album's success brought her fame very soon, especially because the material was an absolute success, where all the songs were on the popularity lists, such as: "El ladrón", "El nido", "Lo que más quisiera", "Pena negra", "Por un puño de oro" and others. It was necessary for her parents to sign permission for her to be able to act, since she was a minor. The following year she successfully launched her solo career, and managed to achieve high popularity ratings for some boleros, such as "Enemigos", "Castigo", "No me quieras tanto." This collaboration extended to the late 1960s with several records on Columbia.

== Later career ==
Following her collaboration with Sonora Santanera, she recorded recorded solo and recorded with the trío romántico Los Tres Ases.

Sonia López is a representative artist of tropical music in Mexico and has been an inspiration for many artists of tropical music in that country. She is currently semi-retired, but she is often considered for interviews and activities in the entertainment world.

== Sources ==
- Soy Una Cantante Totalmente del Pueblo - Interview with Sonia López at americasalsa.com, Sep. 2001
