= Sonora Santanera =

Mexican musical group

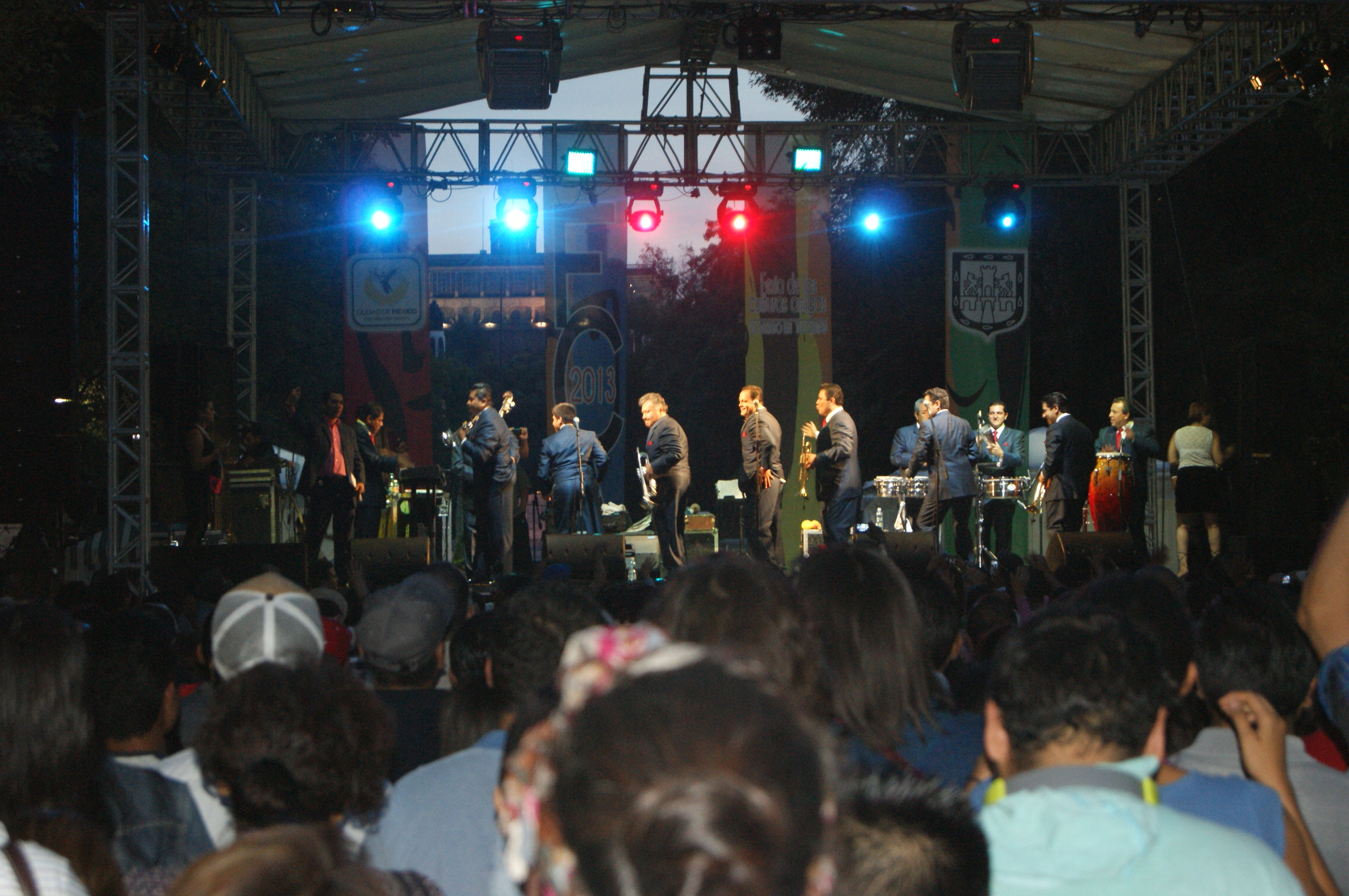
Performing at the Feria de de las Culturas Amigas in 2013

Sonora Santanera is an orchestra playing tropical music from Mexico with over 70 years of history. Modeled after an earlier Cuban band called Sonora Matancera, the Sonora Santanera was founded in 1955 by Carlos Colorado in the state of Tabasco, and went on to find enormous success during the 1960s. In 1960, comic actor Jesús "Palillo" Martínez helped the band play in Mexico City and get a professional record deal under the name of Sonora Santanera. From that time until 1986, the band changed members, but remained focused on Carlos Colorado, the sole musical arranger for the group. Colorado died in a bus accident in 1986, causing some members to split off and form another orchestra called Los Santaneros. The remaining members changed name to Internacional Sonora Santanera. Since the 1980s, little of the band's sound changed although members continued to do so. In the 2000s, more bands appeared using the name of Sonora Santanera as part of their names, leading the orchestra to pursue legal actions and another name change in 2007 to the current name Sonora Santanera de Carlos Colorado.

== History ==
The band is part of Mexico's tropical music tradition with its early popularity coming from the popularity of tropical rhythms such as mambo, cha-cha-cha and others reinvented for orchestral bands in the 1950s and early 1960s.

The band has its origins in the community of Barra de Santa Ana, Tabasco. The first members of the group were Juan Bustos, Silvestre Mercado, Andres Terrones, Armando Espinoza and Sergio Celeda who had known each other since primary school. Carlos Colorado met this group of friends in 1955 and proposed the formation of a group. The initial name of the band was Conjunto Blanco y Negro but was soon changed to Tropical Santanera. The name Santanera was chosen as a reference to the name of their hometown and because it is phonetically similar to Sonora Matancera, a Cuban band of the 1920s, after which the band is believed to have been modeled. Sonora Matancera created the format of an orchestra whose sound was based on tropical sons and boleros. They founded a Mexican tropical style and tradition. From the very beginning, Carlos Colorado was the leader of the band. He created the band's own distinctive version of this tropical orchestra music as the arranger even when it played the same songs as Matancera such as Luces de Nueva York.

The group started by performing at various private events, and until 1960, had become very popular. At one event, they met Jesús “Palillo” Martínez, who took an interest in the group. He hired them to play at the Follies Berger Theater as an orchestra-show playing mambo, cha-cha-cha, danzón, bolero and tango. At this time, their name was changed to Sonora Santanera at the suggestion of Martínez. While in Mexico City, they also studied with the Instituto Nacional de Bellas Artes.Shortly after this, they were given the chance to audition to cut a record with CBS, and did so under the Sonora Santanera name, which include now-standards such as La boa by Carlos Lico and Félix Reyna and Los aretes de la luna by Dolores Quiñones. They also became part of the talent pool on this label in 1960. Hits on this album such as La boa and Los aretes de la luna made them famous and they began to tour Latin America and parts of the United States. The only female singer to ever appear with the group was Sonia Lopez in 1962. She is best known for the songs “El ladron”, “Corazón de acero” and "El nido". However, after less than a year, she decided to leave Santanera to go solo.

Sonora Santanera remained popular through the 1960s, especially with the working classes of Mexico City, even though some of the first personnel changes began at this time. Internacional Sonora Santanera continued the tradition of Colorado although it acquire new, younger musicians such as Hugo Rey, Gabriel Alejandro, Benito López and José Paredes. Lorenzo Hernández, who would later take the lead of the group, began as a bassist in 1963.

Almost everything revolved around Carlos Colorado until his death 1986, when the group's tour bus crashed. Since then, changes to the style have been minimal. However, the loss of Colorado caused division in the original band, causing some members to split off and form another band called Los Santaneros. The remaining members renamed themselves Internacional Sonora Santanera, and had the support of Colorado's widow.

During their career, they have received numerous awards, recognitions and gold and silver records and have traveled extensively in the United States, Central and South America. They have released sixty recordings, with their music featured in many films and television shows. They have received awards such as Las Lunas del Auditorio and were featured on a national lottery ticket in 2010. In 2009, the band was included in the Salón de la Fama, Mexico's musical Hall of Fame.

Through the 2000s, the success of the band has spurred the formation of groups using “Sonora Santanera” as part of the name such as La Sonora Santanera de Carlos Colorado, which was begun by the son and widow of Carlos Colorado. Another group was formed by former member Gildardo Zárate. These new legal problems caused the band to modify its name again in 2007, to its current one La Única Internacional Sonora Santanera in order to distinguish themselves. This band, which insists it is the only and the original has been involved in legal actions in Mexico and the United States in order to lay sole claim to the name “Sonora Santanera.”

As of October 2014, the daughter of Carlos Colorado, Norma, announced the start of "La Sonora Santanera de Carlos Colorado" in the United States of America and appointed Lorenzo Ginez as the leader and managing director of the only group connected to the original family name.

== Members ==
The band has twelve members: Antonio Méndez on trumpet, Francisco Méndez on trumpet, Sandro Celada on percussion (2003), Arturo Ortiz Martínez on percussion (1973), Rubén Nava on trumpet, Tomás Cruz on vocals, Alfredo Pino Cruz on trumpet, Simón Hernández on vocals, Alfredo Hernández Mejía on bass (2001) and José Antonio Torres on piano.

The oldest members are Arturo Ortiz, the current director, Sergio Celada and Antonio Méndez. From the original eight members the band has gained and lost members who have either left to pursue other interests or have died. Former members include founding leader, Carlos Colorado, Sonia López, Armando Espinoza, Juan Bustos, Silvestre Mercado, Antonio Casas Sánchez, Lorenzo Hernández Mejía, Serio Celada, Héctor Fuentes and Jorge Ortiz Martínez, son of Arturo Ortiz. The most recent losses for the orchestra were that of Jorge Ortiz, who died in an automobile accident in 2008 at the age of 41, and Sergio Celada Duarte, who died in 2010 at the age of 70. Tony Arellano has been the M.C. of the band for many years and is also responsible for radio and television promotion of the group.

== Artistry ==
The band consists of trumpets, bass, piano, percussion and four principle voices. It performs musical styles such as mambo, cha-cha-cha, bolero, cumbia and merengue. Much of its repertoire is similar to that from the band's heyday in the 1960s. This includes songs such as Perfume de gardenias, La boa, Luces de Nueva York, Escarcha, ¿Dónde estás Yolanda?, Naufragio, En tu pelo, Si supieras and many more. The band says that some of its success is due to the fact that the music is “commercial, easy to internalize and understandable.” The group has also stated that although they have created and played new works, audiences tend to want the classics and do not like it if the band changes style.

During the international year of the child, they recorded an album of children's songs by Francisco Gabilondo Soler and one by Antonio Méndez. The newest album is called Perfume de Gardenia album and contains some of their classic songs sung by Aracely Arámbula, Niurka, Julio Camejo and Julio Alemán.

== Performances ==
They have performed with Xavier López "Chabelo", Gualberto Castro, Carlos Cuevas, Manoella Torres, Kalimba and Luis de Alba . They have performed in many prestigious Mexican and international venues such as the Auditorio Nacional, Palacio de Bellas Artes, Teatro San Rafael, the Gran Fórum in Acapulco and the Los Angeles Memorial Sports Arena. It is traditional for the band to play New Year's Eve at the Gran Cena Baile de Fin de Año at the Club Habana in Puebla . In 2011, the band performed with the Costa Rican philharmonic orchestra in that country and performed at the Festival Internacional Cervantino in Guanajuato for the first time.
