= Emanuel Ortega =

Argentine pop singer

Emanuel Ortega is an Argentine pop singer. The son of Argentine pop singer Ramón "Palito" Ortega.

Emanuel was introduced to music at a very early stage of life. Thanks to his father Ramón Ortega who was a Latin pop star. When Emanuel was only 6 years old, his family moved to the United States and settled down in Miami. Emanuel's artistic talents came out in 1989 while recording the song Para Siempre Amigos. After two years, Emanuel decided to go back to Argentina. He went there and formed a band called Ladrones De Ladrones.

In 1993 his first album was released under the title Conociendonos. It was an instant success. Soon it achieved gold status and later reached platinum in Argentina. In 1995 he went back to US and worked with producer Carlos Alvarez.

== Discography ==
- 1994 - Conociéndonos
- 1995 - Soñé
- 1997 - Emanuel Ortega
- 1999 - A escondidas
- 2001 - Presente imperfecto
- 2003 - Ortega
- 2007 - El camino
- 2009 - Todo bien
- 2012 - Esta noche
- 2014 - Momentos 1993-2014
