= Las Rosas, Santa Fe =

Las Rosas Las Rosas-Las Lomas
- City
- Location of Las Rosas in Argentina
- Coordinates: 32°29′S 61°35′W
- Country: Argentina
- Province: Santa Fe
- Department: Belgrano

Government
  - Intendant: Javier Meyer (PRO)

Area
  - Total: 697 km^{2} (269 sq mi)

Population (2010 census)
  - Total: 13,689
  - Density: 19.6/km^{2} (50.9/sq mi)
- Time zone: UTC−3 (ART)
- CPA base: S2520
- Dialing code: +54 3471

Las Rosas is a city in the southwest of the province of Santa Fe, Argentina, located 165 km (103 mi) from the provincial capital. It has about 13,689 inhabitants as per the 2010 census [INDEC], and it is the head town of the Belgrano Department, which also comprises the municipalities of Armstrong, Bouquet, Las Parejas, Montes de Oca, and Tortugas.

Las Rosas was founded in 1889 by Guillermo Kemmis & Dickinson bros, and was officially recognized on January 1, 1882, becoming a city on August 20, 1967.

Summers there are warm, humid, wet, and mostly clear and the winters are short, cold, dry, and partly cloudy. Over the course of the year, the temperature typically varies from 41 °F to 87 °F and is rarely below 30 °F or above 95 °F.

== Notable people ==
- Leonardo Ponzio (b. 1982), former football player. Captained River Plate through multiple seasons, capped for Argentina's national team.
- Alfredo Pián (1912 - 1990), race car driver.
- Ramiro Sordo (b. 2000), football player.

== Sister cities ==
- Matelica, Italy
