= Julio Lencina =

Argentine cinematographer and director (1939–2022)

Julio Raúl Rodolfo Lencina (1939 – 13 June 2022) was a cinematographer and director from Argentina who was known for his work in the cinematic world of the Andes (Ecuador, Bolivia, and Peru).

Lencina's first job was as assistant cameraman on the film Palo y hueso, directed by Nicolás Sarquís and starring Héctor da Rosa and Miguel Ligero. Lencina went on to work with E. Stagnaro, Ricardo Wullicher, Mario Sábato, Valladares and others as director of photography. He worked on Los perros hambrientos (Hungry dogs) and Yawar Fiesta (Blood Feast), based on the novel by José María Arguedas and both directed by Luis Figueroa, as well as Chuquiago (Golden Valley) made in Bolivia by Antonio Eguino. He was cinematographer on the 1977 movie ¡Fuera de Aquí! (Get Out of Here), directed by the Bolivian Jorge Sanjinés, which explores the roots and process of exile. It tells of the struggle of indigenous Bolivian peasants against imperialist invaders, including evangelical U.S. missionaries and a multinational mining corporation.

Lencina co-produced with Sasha Menocki the 1988 Verónico Cruz: La deuda interna (The Debt). The movie, directed by Miguel Pereira, describes the life of a young boy whose mother died in childbirth, and whose father left soon afterward to seek work in the city. The boy is brought up by his grandmother up in a mud hut in the mountains, almost entirely cut off from the outside world. He is befriended by a schoolteacher, who eventually takes him on a journey to try to find his father. The movie has been described as naive and achingly slow, but also "very pretty", and "handsomely photographed in sunlight so clear that the shadows of clouds moving across hillsides stand out in sharp relief".

== Films ==
Lencina was cinematographer on the following movies:

- 1971 Nosotros los monos (documentary)
- 1972 Los traidores (The Traitors)
- 1975 Ulises (short)
- 1978 Chuquiago (Golden Valley)
- 1984 Otra esperanza
- 1985 El sol en botellitas
- 1985 Tinku (El Encuentro)
- 1986 Perros de la noche
- 1987 Prontuario de un argentino
- 1990 País cerrado, teatro abierto (documentary)

He produced two movies that were directed by Miguel Pereira:

- 1988 Verónico Cruz: La deuda interna (The Debt) (co-producer)
- 1991 La Ultima Siembra (The Last Harvest)
