= List of British films of 1988 =

A list of films produced in the United Kingdom in 1988 (see 1988 in film):

== 1988 ==
Title	Director	Cast	Genre	Notes
1988
The Adventures of Baron Munchausen	Terry Gilliam	John Neville, Eric Idle, Sarah Polley, Oliver Reed	Adventure/fantasy	Co-production with the United States and West Germany
American Gothic	John Hough	Rod Steiger	Horror	Co-production with Canada
American Roulette	Maurice Hatton	Andy García, Kitty Aldridge	Thriller	
Burning Secret	Andrew Birkin	Klaus Maria Brandauer, Faye Dunaway	Drama	
Buster	David Green	Phil Collins, Julie Walters	Comedy/crime	
A Chorus of Disapproval	Michael Winner	Jeremy Irons, Anthony Hopkins	Comedy	
Consuming Passions	Giles Foster	Vanessa Redgrave, Jonathan Pryce	Comedy	
The Courier	Frank Deasy, Joe Lee	Gabriel Byrne, Ian Bannen	Action	
The Dawning	Robert Knights	Anthony Hopkins, Rebecca Pidgeon, Trevor Howard	Drama	Trevor Howard's final film
Distant Voices, Still Lives	Terence Davies	Lorraine Ashbourne, Jean Boht	Drama	
Dream Demon	Harley Cokeliss	Jemma Redgrave, Timothy Spall, Jimmy Nail	Horror	
The Deceivers	Nicholas Meyer	Pierce Brosnan, Shashi Kapoor, Saeed Jaffery	Drama	Cinecom Pictures
The Dressmaker	Jim O'Brien	Joan Plowright, Billie Whitelaw, Jane Horrocks	Drama	
Drowning by Numbers	Peter Greenaway	Joan Plowright, Juliet Stevenson, Joely Richardson	Drama	Entered into the 1988 Cannes Film Festival
Empire State	Ron Peck	Cathryn Harrison, Jason Hoganson	Crime	
A Fish Called Wanda	Charles Crichton	John Cleese, Jamie Lee Curtis, Kevin Kline, Michael Palin	Comedy	
The Fruit Machine	Philip Saville	Emile Charles, Tony Forsyth	Thriller	
A Handful of Dust	Charles Sturridge	James Wilby, Kristin Scott Thomas, Rupert Graves	Drama	
Hawks	Robert Ellis Miller	Timothy Dalton, Anthony Edwards	Comedy	
Hellbound: Hellraiser II	Tony Randel	Ashley Laurence, Doug Bradley	Horror	
High Hopes	Mike Leigh	Phil Davis, Ruth Sheen	Comedy drama	
High Spirits	Neil Jordan	Peter O'Toole, Steve Guttenberg	Comedy	
Howling IV: The Original Nightmare	John Hough	Romy Windsor, Michael T. Weiss	Horror	
Imagine: John Lennon	Andrew Soft	Narrated by John Lennon	Documentary	
It Couldn't Happen Here	Jack Bond	Pet Shop Boys	Musical/drama	
Just Ask for Diamond	Stephen Bayly	Colin Dale, Saeed Jaffrey	Family	
The Lair of the White Worm	Ken Russell	Hugh Grant, Catherine Oxenberg, Amanda Donohoe	Horror	
Little Dorrit	Christine Edzard	Derek Jacobi, Joan Greenwood, Alec Guinness	Literary drama	
Madame Sousatzka	John Schlesinger	Shirley MacLaine, Navin Chowdhry	Drama	
Mapantsula	Oliver Schmitz	Thomas Mogotlane, Marcel Van Heerden	Crime	Co-production with South Africa
Olympus Force	James Fortune, Robert Garofalo	Linda Thorson, Richard Todd, John Draikas	Action	Co-production with Greece
Paperhouse	Bernard Rose	Charlotte Burke, Ben Cross	Drama/fantasy/horror	
Paris by Night	David Hare	Charlotte Rampling, Michael Gambon	Thriller	
Pascali's Island	James Dearden	Ben Kingsley, Charles Dance, Helen Mirren	Drama	Entered into the 1988 Cannes Film Festival
Prisoner of Rio	Lech Majewski	Steven Berkoff, Paul Freeman	Drama	
Run for Your Life	Terence Young	David Carradine, Lauren Hutton, George Segal, Franco Nero	Sport/drama	
Salome's Last Dance	Ken Russell	Glenda Jackson, Stratford Johns, Nickolas Grace	Drama	Based on Oscar Wilde's play Salome
Shag	Zelda Barron	Phoebe Cates, Scott Coffey, Bridget Fonda, Annabeth Gish	Comedy/romance	Co-production with the United States
Soursweet	Mike Newell	Sylvia Chang, Danny Dun	Drama	Based on Timothy Mo's novel Sour Sweet
Stealing Heaven	Clive Donner	Derek de Lint, Kim Thomson, Denholm Elliott	Drama	Co-production with Yugoslavia
Stormy Monday	Mike Figgis	Melanie Griffith, Tommy Lee Jones, Sting	Drama	
A Summer Story	Piers Haggard	Imogen Stubbs, James Wilby	Romance	
Testimony	Tony Palmer	Ben Kingsley, Sherry Baines	Biopic	
Verónico Cruz	Miguel Pereira	Juan José Camero, Gonzalo Morales	Drama	Co-production with Argentina
Without a Clue	Thom Eberhardt	Michael Caine, Ben Kingsley	Comedy	Sherlock Holmes spoof
A World Apart	Chris Menges	Jodhi May, Barbara Hershey, Jeroen Krabbé	Drama	Won three awards at the 1988 Cannes Film Festival
Yellow Pages	James Kenelm Clarke	Chris Lemmon, Jean Simmons	Comedy	

== See also ==
- 1988 in British music
- 1988 in British radio
- 1988 in British television
- 1988 in the United Kingdom
