= Patricio Coll =

Argentine film director

- Born: Argentina
- Occupations: Film director, screenwriter
- Known for: Cicatrices, Regreso a Fortín Olmos

Patricio Coll is an Argentine film director, who has worked in film, video and TV in Argentina, Venezuela and Spain. He currently resides in Santa Fe.

Coll was assistant director on the acclaimed 1968 movie Palo y hueso, directed by Nicolás Sarquís and starring Héctor da Rosa and Miguel Ligero. For his 2001 movie Cicatrices (Scars), based on the novel of the same name by Juan José Saer, he was nominated for the 2002 Silver Condor award for Best Screenplay Adaptation at the Mar del Plata Film Festival. Cicatrices weaves together three stories of frustrated men and women in the 1960s, a downbeat movie in which it always seems to be raining. The film starred Omar Fantini, Raul Kreig, Pablo Di Crocce, Monica Galan, Maria Leal and Vando Villamil. One critic wrote that "Coll's film is not easy to pigeonhole: it revolutionizes the visual language, and yet openly avoids clichés of cinema in recent decades".

In 1966, Patrick Coll and Jorge Goldenberg Hachero filmed a documentary on the social situation of the loggers in the northern province of Santa Fe. The film crew was based in a small town called Fortin Olmos, where a group of worker priests from the Congregation of the Brothers de Foucauld had settled a few years earlier and established a farm cooperative. Forty years later, the filmmakers returned in search of survivors from that experiment, documented in the 2008 Regreso a Fortín Olmos (Back to Fortin Olmos). Although the cooperative proved to be an unattainable utopia, the film shows the clarity, conviction, passion and dedication of the protagonists. He co-directed City of Shadows (2010) with Mario Cuello, Julio Hiver and Diego Soffici. The movie is based on four stories by different writers from Santa Fe, billed as "Four stories, four managers, one city".

== Movies ==
Coll wrote and directed:

- Hachero nomás (short documentary), 1966
- Cicatrices (Scars), 2001
- Regreso a Fortín Olmos (Back to Fortin Olmos) (documentary), 2008
- Ciudad de sombras (City of Shadows), 2010
