= Raúl Beceyro =

Argentine film director

Raúl Beceyro (born 1944) is an Argentine film director, critic and photographer. He is known for the film Nadie Nada Nunca (No, No, Never – 1998), which he produced and directed, based on the novel of the same name by Juan Jose Saer. The film starred Antonio Germano, Marina Vasquez and Alicia Dolinsky. He met and was inspired by Saer in 1962, when Saer was his teacher at the Instituto de Cine de Santa Fe.

His book History of photography in 10 images, published in the 1980s, discussed photographs not only in terms of technique or aesthetics, but also in terms of what the images say or represent. Since 1985, he has headed the Film Workshop of the Universidad Nacional del Litoral in Santa Fe. His book "Fotogramas Santafesinos. Instituto de Cinematografía de la UNL, 1956–1976" is a retrospective of this institution dedicated to its lost students. He has made several documentary films about different aspects of Santa Fe, where he lives, including one about the constitutional convention held in the city, and another about the 2007 elections.

== Films ==
Beceyro worked in various roles in the Argentine film industry:

- Writer and assistant director of Palo y hueso (1968), directed by Nicolás Sarquís, based on a short story by Juan Jose Saer
- Writer, producer and director of Nadie Nada Nunca (1998), also based on a story by Juan Jose Saer
- Sound for Nadar contra la corriente (2002) and Bienal (2004)
- Writer and director of Guadalupe / Imágenes de Santa Fe 1 (2000)
- Writer and director of Jazz / Imágenes de Santa Fe 2 (2005).
- Writer and director of 2007. Imágenes de Santa Fe 3 (2008)
- Self-published documentaries La noche de las cámaras despiertas (2002) and Dirigido por... (2005)

== Books ==
- Raúl Beceyro (1978). Ensayos sobre fotografía. Editorial Arte y Libros.
- Raúl Beceyro; Dominique Ferré (1980). Henri Cartier-Bresson: Ensayo. Créatis. ISBN 968-5804-13-3.
- Raúl Beceyro (1980). Historia de la fotografía en 10 imágenes. Centro Editor de Am.Latina.
- Raúl Beceyro (1983). Sobre Elisa vida mia de Carlos Saura (Spanish ed.). Centre d'etudes hispaniques et hispano-americaines, Universite de Rennes. ISBN 2-900055-03-2.
- Raúl Beceyro (1997). Cine y política: ensayos sobre cine argentino. Centro de Publicaciones, Universidad Nacional del Litoral.
- Raúl Beceyro (2002). Apuntes De Cine. Centro de Publicaciones, Universidad Nacional del Litoral. ISBN 987-508-175-2.
- Raúl Beceyro (2003). Ensayos sobre fotografía. Paidós. ISBN 950-12-2718-9.
- Raúl Beceyro (December 2008). Manual de Cine: Como Se Hace Un Film. Beatriz Vierbo Editora. ISBN 978-950-845-227-6.
