= Juan José Saer =

Argentine writer (1937–2005)

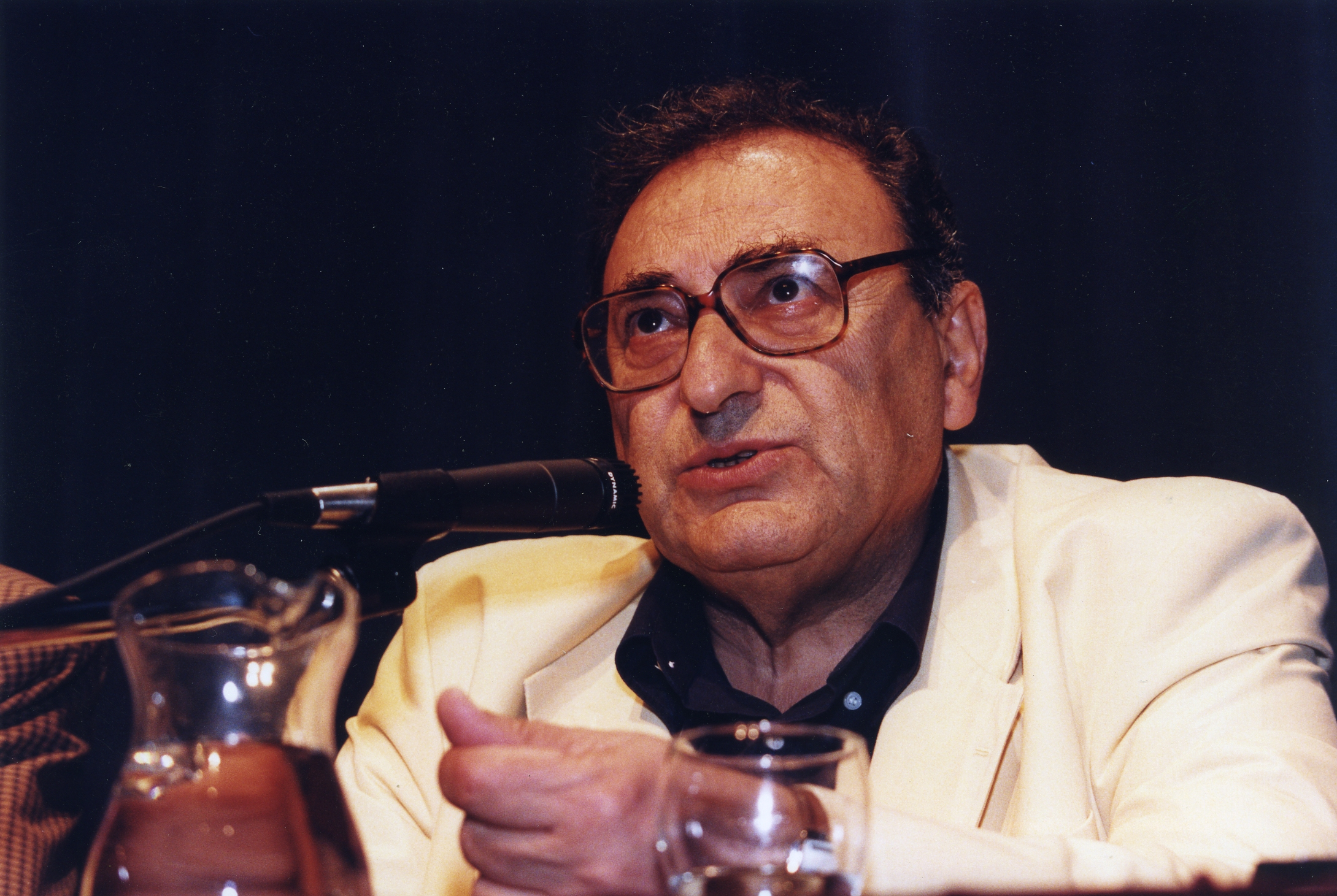
- Meeting of Juan José Saer with the public of the city
- Born: June 28, 1937; Serodino, Argentina
- Died: June 11, 2005 (aged 67); Paris, France
- Education: law and philosophy
- Alma mater: National University of the Littoral
- Occupations: Novelist, writer
- Partner: Laurence Gueguen (1968-2005)
- Writing career
- Notable awards: Premio Nadal

Juan José Saer (28 June 1937 – 11 June 2005) was a major Argentine writer. For his novel The Event (La ocasión), he won the Premio Nadal in 1987. In 1990, he shared the Silver Condor Award for Best Original Screenplay for the film Las veredas de Saturno. In 2004, he received a Platinum Konex Award for his 1994–98 work.

== Biography ==
Born in Serodino, a small town in the Santa Fe Province, to Syrian immigrants originally from Damascus, Saer studied law and philosophy at the National University of the Littoral, where he taught History of Cinematography. Thanks to a scholarship, he moved to Paris in 1968 where he taught at the University of Rennes.

Suffering from lung cancer, he died in Paris on 11 June 2005, at the age of sixty-seven. He was buried in the Père-Lachaise cemetery. At the time of his death he was writing the last chapters of his longest novel, La Grande, which ended up appearing posthumously along with Trabajos, a collection of literary articles that appeared in various newspapers and magazines that Saer already had ready for publication.

In 2012, the first instalment of his previously unpublished working notebooks were edited and published as Papeles de trabajo by Seix Barral in Argentina. A second volume soon followed, which was the result of five years of editing work by a team coordinated by Julio Premat, who wrote the introduction of the first volume. These notebooks allow readers a privileged insight into the creative processes of Saer. As critics point out, the books of Juan José Saer may be taken as a single "oeuvre", set in his "La Zona", a fluvial region around the Argentinian city of Santa Fé, populated by characters who are developed and become referential from novel to novel.

Saer's novels frequently thematize the situation of the self-exiled writer through the figures of two twin brothers, one of whom remained in Argentina during the dictatorship, while the other, like Saer himself, moved to Paris; several of his novels trace their separate and intertwining fates, along with those of a host of other characters who alternate between foreground and background from work to work. Like several of his contemporaries (Ricardo Piglia, César Aira, Roberto Bolaño), Saer's work often builds on particular and highly codified genres, such as detective fiction (The Investigation), colonial encounters (The Witness), travelogues (El río sin orillas), or canonical modern writers (e.g. Proust, in The One Before and Joyce, in "Sombras sobre vidrio esmerilado").

== Style and influences ==
Along with Juan Carlos Onetti, Saer is the Rioplatense writer (language of Rio de la plata)who most evidences within his work the influence of the American writer William Faulkner, especially for the recurrence of a group of characters (Carlos Tomatis, Pichón Garay, Ángel Leto, Washington Noriega and the Matemático, among others) in a specific space (the city of Santa Fe).

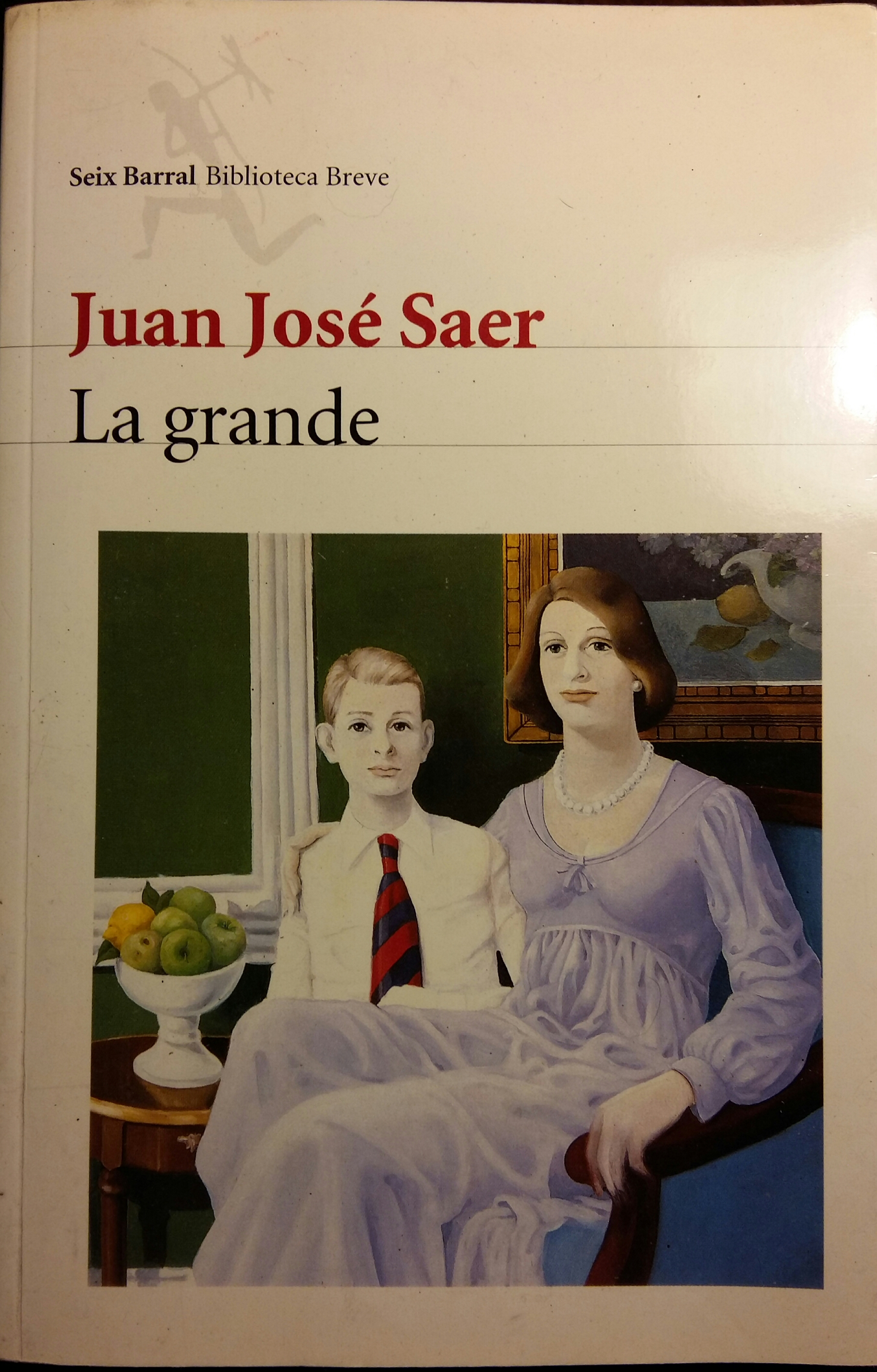
Cover of the first edition of La grande, the author's latest novel.

== Legacy and reputation ==
Four of his novels - The Investigation (La Pesquisa), The Witness (El Entenado), La grande and The Sixty-Five Years of Washington (Glosa) - appear on various lists made by Latin American and Spanish writers and critics of recent great books in the Spanish language.

Martin Kohan considers Saer to be the most important writer of Argentina after Jorge Luis Borges. Beatriz Sarlo considers him to be the best Argentine writer of the second half of the 20th century.

== Bibliography ==
=== Novels ===
- Responso (1963)
- La vuelta completa (1966)
- Cicatrices (1969). Scars, trans. Steve Dolph (Open Letter, 2011)
- El limonero real (1974). The Regal Lemon Tree, trans. Sergio Waisman (Open Letter, 2020)
- Nadie nada nunca (1980). Nobody Nothing Never, trans. Helen R. Lane (Serpent's Tail, 1993)
- El entenado (1983). The Witness, trans. Margaret Jull Costa (Serpent's Tail, 1990)
- Glosa (1986). The Sixty-Five Years of Washington, trans. Steve Dolph (Open Letter, 2010)
- La ocasión (1987). The Event, trans. Helen R. Lane (Serpent's Tail, 1995; Open Letter, 2025)
- El río sin orillas (1991)
- Lo imborrable (1992)
- La pesquisa (1994). The Investigation, trans. Helen R. Lane (Serpent's Tail, 1999)
- Las nubes (1997). The Clouds, trans. Hilary Vaughn Dobel (Open Letter, 2016)
- La grande (2005). La Grande, trans. Steve Dolph (Open Letter, 2014)

=== Novellas and short stories ===
- En la zona, 1957-1960 (1960)
- Palo y hueso (1965)
- Unidad de lugar (1967)
- La mayor (1976). The One Before, trans. Roanne Kantor (Open Letter, 2015)
- Lugar (2000)

=== Poems ===
- El arte de narrar: poemas, 1960/1975 (1977)
- El arte de narrar : poemas (1960-1987) (2008)

=== Essays ===
- El concepto de ficción (1997)
- La narración-objeto (1999)
- Trabajos (2005)

=== Scripts ===
- Palo y hueso (1968)
- Las veredas de Saturno (1985, co-authored with Hugo Santiago)

=== Compilations ===
- Narraciones 1 (1983)
- Narraciones 2 (1983)
- Cuentos completos, 1957–2000 (2001)
- Papeles de trabajo. Borradores inéditos (2012)
- Papeles de trabajo II. Borradores inéditos (2013)
- Poemas. Borradores inéditos 3 (2013)
- Ensayos. Borradores inéditos 4 (2015)
- A medio borrar (2017)

=== English translations in anthologies and journals ===
- "Shadows on Jeweled Glass", trans. Jim Hicks (The Massachusetts Review 51.1, 2010)

== Film adaptations ==
- Palo y hueso (Stick and Bone, 1968), directed by Nicolás Sarquís, with a script co-written with the author; based on the homonymous story.
- Nadie Nada Nunca (No, No, Never, 1998) directed by Raúl Beceyro; based on the homonymous novel.
- Cicatrices (Scars, 2001) directed by Patricio Coll; based on the homonymous novel.
- Tres de corazones (Three of Hearts, 2007) directed by Sergio Renán; based on the story The Taximetrist .
- Yarará (2015) directed by Santiago Sarquís; based on the story The path of the coast .
- El limonero real (The real lemon tree, 2016) directed by Gustavo Fontán; based on the homonymous novel.
