= Gonzalo Morales =

Gonzalo Morales may refer to:

- Gonzalo Morales (actor), Argentine actor
- Gonzalo Morales Sáurez (1945–2017), Costa Rican painter
