= Bernardo de Irigoyen (disambiguation) =

Bernardo de Irigoyen (1822-1906) was an Argentine lawyer, diplomat and politician.

Bernardo de Irigoyen may also refer to:

- Bernardo de Irigoyen, Santa Fe, Argentina
- Bernardo de Irigoyen, Misiones, Argentina
