= The Underground Man =

The Underground Man may refer to:

- The Underground Man a 1971 novel by Ross Macdonald
- The Underground Man (novel), a 1997 English novel by Mick Jackson
- The narrator of Notes from Underground, an 1864 Russian short novel by Fyodor Dostoevsky
- The Underground Man (1974 film), an American film by Paul Wendkos
- The Underground Man (1981 film), an Argentine film by Nicolás Sarquís
