= Miguel Ligero =

Miguel Ligero may refer to:

- Miguel Ligero (Argentine actor) (1911–1989)
- Miguel Ligero (Spanish actor) (1890–1968)
