= Camero =

Camero may refer to:

== Surname ==
- Cándido Camero (born 1921), Cuban percussionist
- Juan José Camero (born 1947), Argentine film, television, and theatre actor

== Places ==
- Cameros, a comarca in La Rioja, Spain

== Common misspellings ==
- Francesco Canero Medici (1886–1946), Italian diplomat
- Chevrolet Camaro, a muscle car produced by General Motors (often misspelled as "Camero")
