= Jorge Sampaoli =

Argentine football manager (born 1960)

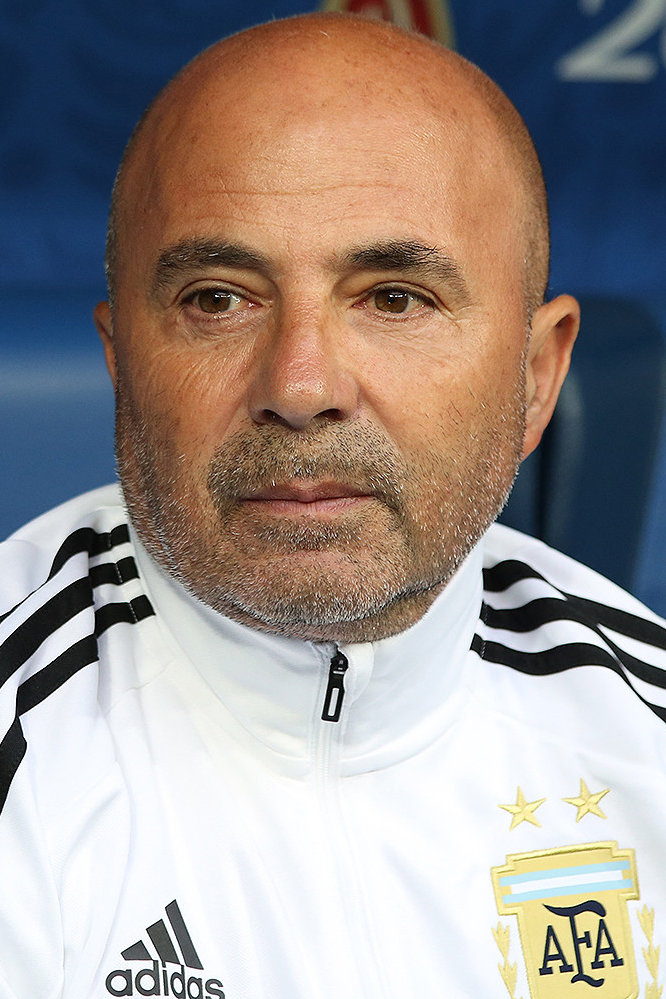
- Jorge Sampaoli as head coach of Argentina at the 2018 FIFA World Cup

Personal information
- Full name: Jorge Luis Sampaoli Moya
- Date of birth: 13 March 1960 (age 66)
- Place of birth: Casilda, Santa Fe, Argentina
- Height: 1.67 m (5 ft 6 in)
- Position: Defender

Youth career
- Years: Team
- 1977–1979: Newell's Old Boys

Managerial career
- 1991: Alumni de Casilda (interim)
- 1992–1994: Alumni de Casilda (youth)
- 1994–1996: Alumni de Casilda
- 1996: Belgrano de Arequito
- 1996–1997: Argentino de Rosario
- 1997: Alumni de Casilda
- 1998: Belgrano de Arequito
- 1999–2000: Aprendices Casildenses
- 2000: Argentino de Rosario
- 2001: Alumni de Casilda
- 2002: Juan Aurich
- 2002–2003: Sport Boys
- 2004–2005: Coronel Bolognesi
- 2006: Coronel Bolognesi
- 2007: Sporting Cristal
- 2008–2009: O'Higgins
- 2009–2010: Emelec
- 2010–2012: Universidad de Chile
- 2012–2016: Chile
- 2016–2017: Sevilla
- 2017–2018: Argentina
- 2018–2019: Santos
- 2020–2021: Atlético Mineiro
- 2021–2022: Marseille
- 2022–2023: Sevilla
- 2023: Flamengo
- 2024–2025: Rennes
- 2025–2026: Atlético Mineiro
- 2026: Talleres
Medal record
Men's football
Representing Chile (as manager)
Copa América
| Winner | 2015 Chile |

Jorge Luis Sampaoli Moya (Spanish pronunciation: [ˈxoɾxe sampaˈoli]; born 13 March 1960) is an Argentine football manager.

Sampaoli had a brief playing career in Argentina's amateur leagues which was cut short by injuries. His early coaching career saw him take charge of clubs in Argentina, Peru, Chile and Ecuador. He earned widespread recognition as manager of Universidad de Chile, winning three league titles and the 2011 Copa Sudamericana with a brand of attacking football likened to that of Marcelo Bielsa. His successful spell at the helm of the Santiago club earned him an offer to coach the Chile national team in 2012, which he led to their first ever Copa América title in 2015 on home soil.

Sampaoli's first experience outside of South America was with Spanish club Sevilla in 2016. In 2017, he accepted the job at the Argentina national team, leading his home nation at the 2018 FIFA World Cup. His later career includes spells in Brazil, with Santos, Atlético Mineiro and Flamengo, in France, with Marseille and Rennes, and a second stint with Sevilla.

== Early life ==
Jorge Sampaoli was born in Casilda, in the Caseros Department of Santa Fe Province, Argentina. In his youth he played for amateur sides in his local league before joining the Newell's Old Boys youth setup, where he later said he suffered from stage fright that prevented him from progressing. While at the club he suffered fractures to his tibia and fibula in 1979, forcing him to retire from playing at age 19. During his final playing years and early coaching career he worked part-time at a bank.

== Coaching career ==
=== Early career ===
In October 1991, aged just 31, Sampaoli acted as an interim coach for hometown side Club Atlético Alumni, as manager Mario Bonavera was out on a personal trip. During that season, he was already working as a fitness coach aside from being a defensive midfielder. He was given the role of manager of the club's youth setup in the following year, but only retired in 1993. In 1994 he was named manager of the first team, taking the club to the finals of the Liga Casildense de Fútbol, but lost it to CA 9 de Julio de Arequito. In the following season, he again reached the finals, but suffered defeat to the very same club.

For the 1996 season, Sampaoli was appointed at 9 Julio's rivals CA Belgrano de Arequito, and coached to win the year's league title with the side. In May of that year, he was hired by Primera B Metropolitana side Argentino de Rosario, and ended the season in the 13th position. He subsequently returned to Alumni and Belgrano, before taking over CA Aprendices Casildenses in 1999; with the latter side, he won two consecutive Liga Casildense titles.

Sampaoli returned to a third stint with Alumni in 2001, after a short stint back at Argentino de Rosario in the previous year. Despite reaching the finals of the Liga Casildense, he lost it to former side Aprendices.

=== Juan Aurich ===
On 9 January 2002, Sampaoli was appointed coach of Peruvian Primera División side Juan Aurich; it was the first professional club in his career. On 24 February, he directed his first professional game against Universitario, where they lost 2–1 after leading the whole game due to a penalty scored by Carlos Flores (66th minute).

Sampaoli had a poor spell in Juan Aurich, directing only eight games, five of which the team lost and two where the team tied with Coopsol Trujillo and Alianza Lima. The team only won against Cienciano 2–0 with goals from César Sánchez and Flores. He left the club in April, when Aurich was sitting at the bottom of the table.

=== Sport Boys ===
Months later, in June, Sampaoli was hired by Sport Boys to direct the team in the Torneo Descentralizado, debuting with a 3–1 loss to Coopsol. His side finished sixth in the tournament, achieving important triumphs over Alianza (1–0 with a goal of Alfredo Carmona) and Universitario (2–0 with goals by Paolo de la Haza and Carmona again at Estadio Monumental). He left the club during the 2003 Torneo Descentralizado, after a player's strike.

=== Coronel Bolognesi ===
In 2004, Sampaoli was named coach of fellow top-tier side Coronel Bolognesi, replacing Roberto Mosquera. There, he had an irregular start, but soon coached to settle the team during the Peruvian 2005's Descentralizado, finishing fifth in the Apertura, and then coached to finish third in that same year's Clausura, taking the club to their first international competition.

Sampaoli opted to leave the club in December 2005, but returned on 27 June 2006, replacing compatriot Raúl Donsanti. Competing in the 2006's Clausura as well as in the Sudamericana tournament, his side finished third in the national league.

=== Sporting Cristal ===
In 2007, Sampaoli was hired as the head coach of Sporting Cristal. However, his time at Cristal turned out to be disappointing after 18 matches and only five wins. He was dismissed from the "Celestes" in May of that year, ending his Peruvian coaching career.

=== O'Higgins ===
On 12 December 2007, Sampaoli arrived in Chile to take over at O'Higgins, in the place of Jorge Garcés. In 2008, the team proved to be tough to crack for bigger Chilean teams, finishing third in that year's Apertura. They were eliminated by powerhouse Universidad de Chile in the playoff quarterfinals.

The next year turned out to be a tough year for Sampaoli, as "La Celeste" had an irregular campaign, where they finished in 8th place, and, despite qualifying to the 2009's Apertura Playoffs, ended up being thrashed 6–1 in the second leg of the quarterfinals by Unión Española. He resigned in August 2009, being replaced by Geraldo Silva.

=== Emelec ===
On 18 December 2009, Sampaoli was named Emelec coach for the upcoming season. Under his guidance, the team competed in the 2010 Copa Libertadores, being eliminated in the group stage, but had an impressive run in the local competition, finishing first in the 2010 tournament first stage, earning them a spot in the 2010 Copa Sudamericana and 2011 Copa Libertadores preliminary stage.

That year, Emelec faced Liga de Quito, who finished in first place in that year's second half, but ended up losing.

=== Universidad de Chile ===
On 15 December 2010, Sampaoli was presented as coach of Universidad de Chile. With the side he achieved impressive results, winning the 2011 Apertura, the 2011 Clausura, the 2012 Apertura and the 2011 Copa Sudamericana. He left the club after accepting an offer from the national team, with 80 wins in 135 matches.

=== Chile national team ===
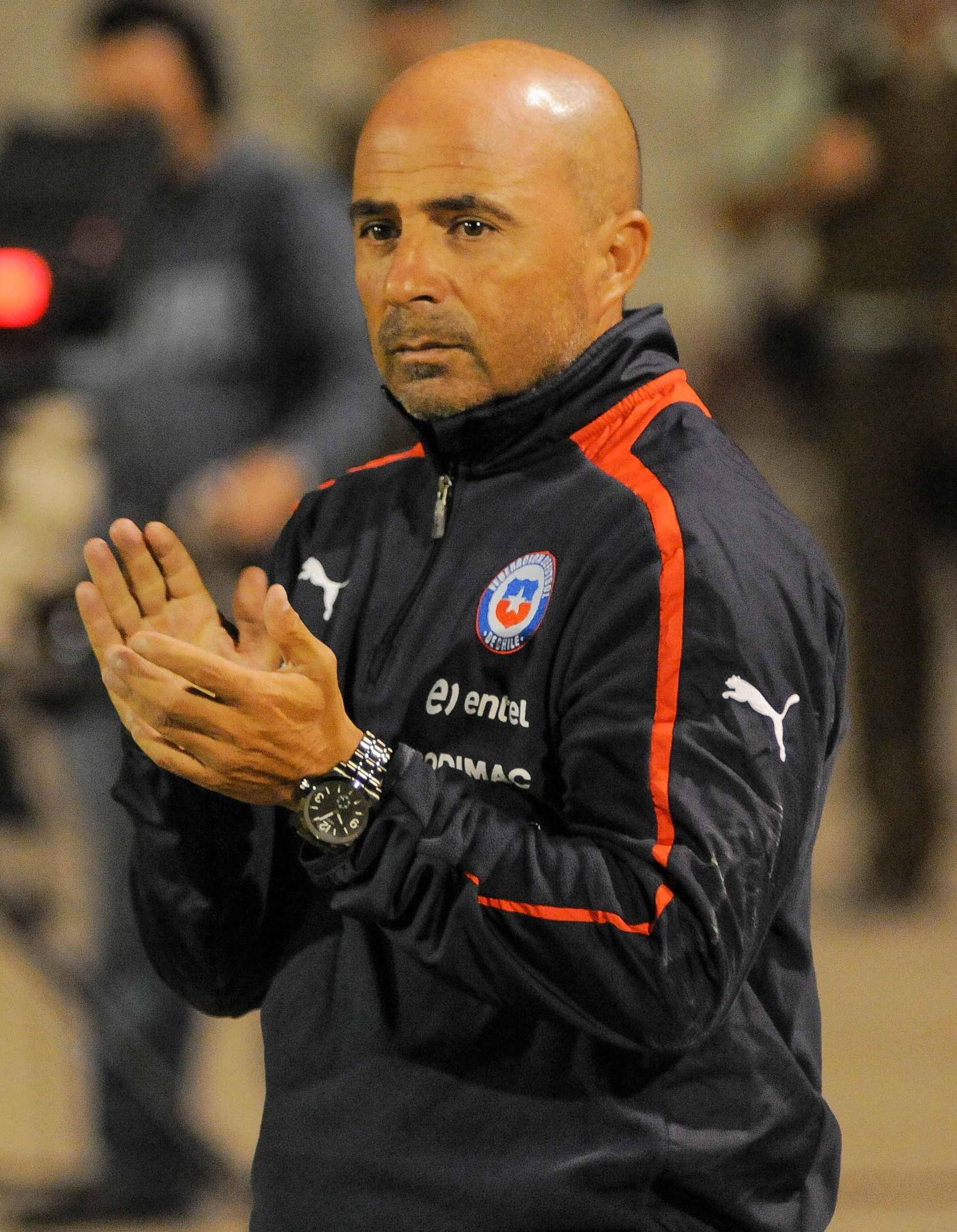
Sampaoli coaching the Chile national team in 2013

On 3 December 2012, Chile's Asociación Nacional de Fútbol Profesional announced that Sampaoli would take over as coach of the national team after a successful run with La U. His arrival brought about a turnaround in performances and results, with Chile winning three of their first four World Cup qualifiers after his appointment. Under Sampaoli, Chile returned to the energetic, high-pressing game of Marcelo Bielsa, the Argentinian coach who inspired Sampaoli's coaching philosophy.

In 2015, Sampaoli led Chile to victory in the 2015 Copa America, the country's first major trophy. On 30 November of that year, he was named on the final three-man shortlist for the 2015 FIFA World Coach of the Year award, joined by Spaniards Pep Guardiola (Bayern Munich) and Luis Enrique (Barcelona).

On 19 January 2016, Sampaoli resigned as coach of Chile, after allegedly having disputes with Arturo Salah, recently elected president of ANFP.

=== Sevilla ===
On 27 June 2016, La Liga club Sevilla announced that Sampaoli would take over Sevilla on a two-year deal. On 15 January 2017, his side beat Zinedine Zidane's Real Madrid 2–1, ending their 40-match unbeaten run.

=== Argentina national team ===
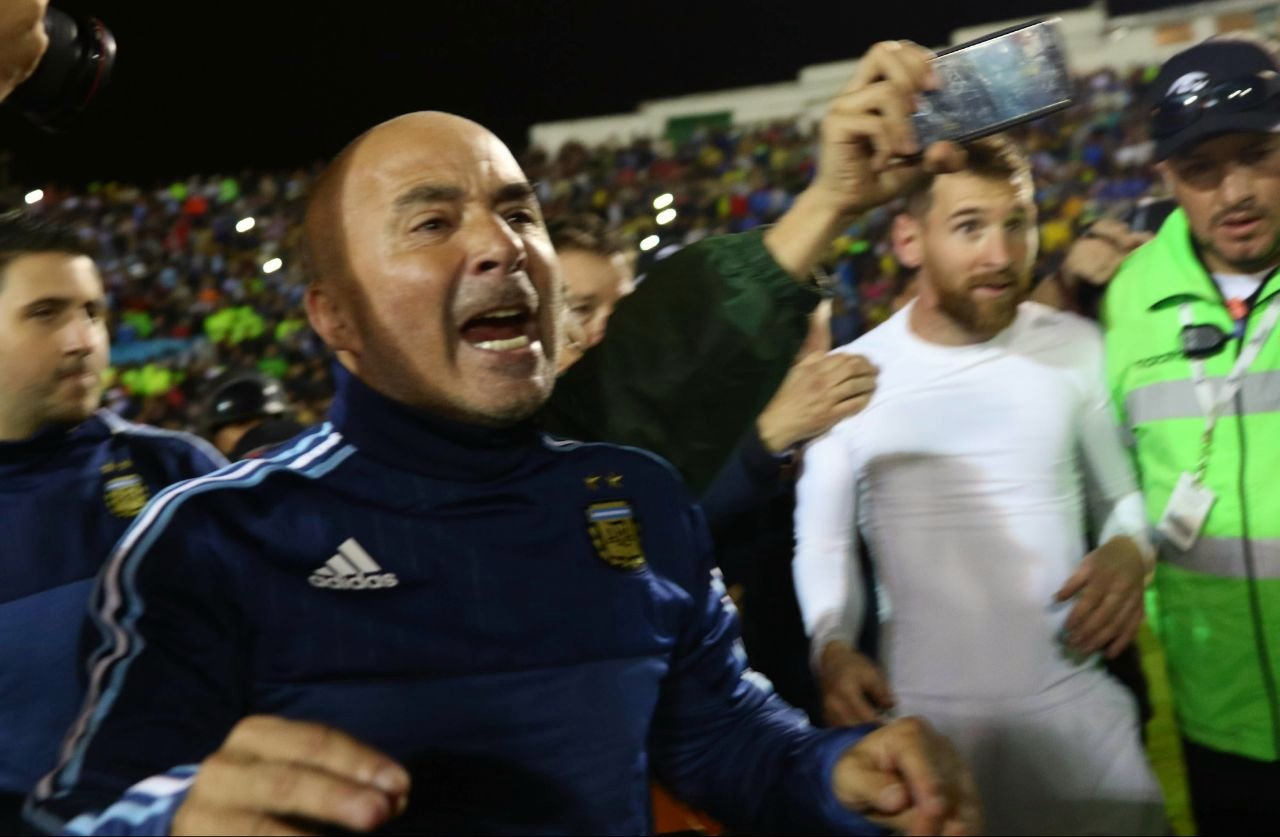
Sampaoli in October 2017, celebrating Argentina's qualification for the 2018 World Cup

On 20 May 2017, the Argentine Football Association announced that Sampaoli would take over as the new coach of the national team. He was officially presented on 1 June 2017. Sampaoli's first game in charge was a friendly match against Brazil on 9 June in Australia, with Argentina winning 1–0.

However, Argentina greatly struggled during the qualifiers, and it took a Lionel Messi hat trick at Ecuador to confirm qualification for the 2018 FIFA World Cup. On 14 May 2018, Sampaoli announced a 35-man preliminary squad for the 2018 World Cup. He announced the final squad on 21 May 2018.

At the World Cup, Argentina had drawn 1–1 with Iceland during their opening World Cup group match, an underwhelming performance that drew criticism from former Argentine captain and coach Diego Maradona. In the next group match, Argentina suffered a heavy 0–3 loss by Croatia due to "a defence left exposed, a midfield that was overrun and an attack that was blunted", which put them on the brink of elimination and led to unconfirmed reports that Sampaoli would be sacked. Senior members of the team including Messi and Javier Mascherano confronted Sampaoli and his assistants in the dressing room, while also approaching members of the Argentine FA to discuss their concerns, and there were also various rumors that Messi was involved in team selection which dismissed Sampaoli's leadership, evoking a formation based on the decisions of Argentine players. The match against Croatia was his 13th game in charge, where he had used 13 lineups and a total of 59 players, and despite a myriad of attacking choices the defence was poor.

Sampaoli remained in his position, as Argentina defeated Nigeria 2–1 in the third group match to advance to the knockout stage. In the round of 16, Argentina lost to France 4–3 and were eliminated from the tournament.

On 15 July 2018, the Argentine Football Association announced that Sampaoli had left his position as national coach by mutual consent.

=== Santos ===
On 13 December 2018, Brazilian club Santos announced that Sampaoli had reached an "agreement in principle" to become the club's coach for the 2019 season. He signed a two-year contract on 17 December, being presented the following day.

Sampaoli was highly praised by the media during his time at the club, specifically due to the offensive football displayed. Despite being knocked out of the year's Campeonato Paulista and Copa Sudamericana, he took the club to the second position in the Série A.

On 9 December 2019, Sampaoli resigned; Santos announced the departure of the coach in the following day.

=== Atlético Mineiro ===
On 1 March 2020, Sampaoli took charge of Atlético Mineiro. On 22 February 2021, Sampaoli requested the termination of his contract at the end of the current season. On the same day, Atlético Mineiro announced that they had accepted the termination of Sampaoli contract.

=== Marseille ===
On 26 February 2021, Ligue 1 club Marseille announced Sampaoli as their coach until June 2023. He succeeded Andre Villas-Boas.

=== Return to Sevilla ===
On 6 October 2022, Sevilla announced the return of Sampaoli to be their coach. On 21 March 2023, Sampaoli was sacked after a 2–0 loss to Getafe left Sevilla only two ponts above the relegation places; later that day, he was replaced by José Luis Mendilibar.

=== Flamengo ===
On 14 April 2023, Sampaoli returned to the Campeonato Brasileiro Série A and Copa Libertadores after Flamengo announced that he signed a contract as their coach until 31 December 2024. On 28 September, he was dismissed from his position.

=== Rennes ===
On 11 November 2024, he returned to Ligue 1 and was appointed manager of Rennes on a contract until 2026. On 30 January 2025, Sampaoli was sacked after a series of bad results.

=== Return to Atlético Mineiro ===
On 2 September 2025, it was announced the return of Sampaoli to Atlético Mineiro on a contract running until December 2027. He left the club on 12 February 2026, after a shaky start to the season with two wins in 10 matches.

== Managerial statistics ==
As of 31 August 2026

Managerial record by team and tenure
| Team | Nat. | From | To | Record | | | | | | | | Ref |
| Team | Nat. | From | To | G | W | D | L | GF | GA | GD | Win % | Ref |
|---|---|---|---|---|---|---|---|---|---|---|---|---|
| Argentino de Rosario | (Argentina) | 29 June 1996 | 19 April 1997 | 30 | 11 | 13 | 6 | 39 | 30 | +9 | 36.67 | |
| Argentino de Rosario | (Argentina) | 30 September 2000 | 28 October 2000 | 6 | 2 | 1 | 3 | 4 | 11 | −7 | 33.33 | |
| Juan Aurich | (Peru) | 9 January 2002 | 14 April 2002 | 8 | 1 | 2 | 5 | 9 | 14 | −5 | 12.50 | |
| Sport Boys | (Peru) | 6 June 2002 | 31 December 2003 | 62 | 24 | 18 | 20 | 94 | 75 | +19 | 38.71 | |
| Coronel Bolognesi | (Peru) | 1 April 2004 | 31 December 2005 | 95 | 39 | 22 | 34 | 144 | 127 | +17 | 41.05 | |
| Coronel Bolognesi | (Peru) | 27 June 2006 | 31 December 2006 | 28 | 16 | 2 | 10 | 43 | 37 | +6 | 57.14 | |
| Sporting Cristal | (Peru) | 1 January 2007 | 5 May 2007 | 18 | 5 | 6 | 7 | 23 | 32 | −9 | 27.78 | |
| O'Higgins | (Chile) | 12 December 2007 | 1 August 2009 | 66 | 27 | 16 | 23 | 107 | 103 | +4 | 40.91 | |
| Emelec | (Ecuador) | 18 December 2009 | 14 December 2010 | 58 | 31 | 14 | 13 | 80 | 49 | +31 | 53.45 | |
| Universidad de Chile | (Chile) | 15 December 2010 | 3 December 2012 | 135 | 80 | 35 | 20 | 268 | 132 | +136 | 59.26 | |
| Chile | (Chile) | 3 December 2012 | 19 January 2016 | 44 | 27 | 9 | 8 | 89 | 44 | +45 | 61.36 | |
| Sevilla | (Spain) | 27 June 2016 | 26 May 2017 | 53 | 27 | 12 | 14 | 97 | 71 | +26 | 50.94 | |
| Argentina | (Argentina) | 1 June 2017 | 15 July 2018 | 15 | 7 | 4 | 4 | 27 | 21 | +6 | 46.67 | |
| Santos | (Brazil) | 13 December 2018 | 9 December 2019 | 64 | 35 | 14 | 15 | 102 | 55 | +47 | 54.69 | |
| Atlético Mineiro | (Brazil) | 1 March 2020 | 25 February 2021 | 45 | 26 | 9 | 10 | 80 | 49 | +31 | 57.78 | |
| Marseille | (France) | 8 March 2021 | 1 July 2022 | 67 | 36 | 17 | 14 | 113 | 73 | +40 | 53.73 | |
| Sevilla | (Spain) | 6 October 2022 | 21 March 2023 | 31 | 13 | 6 | 12 | 43 | 32 | +11 | 41.94 | |
| Flamengo | (Brazil) | 14 April 2023 | 28 September 2023 | 39 | 20 | 11 | 8 | 63 | 41 | +22 | 51.28 | |
| Rennes | (France) | 11 November 2024 | 30 January 2025 | 10 | 3 | 0 | 7 | 17 | 14 | +3 | 30.00 | |
| Atlético Mineiro | (Brazil) | 2 September 2025 | 12 February 2026 | 34 | 10 | 16 | 8 | 44 | 38 | +6 | 29.41 | |
| Talleres | (Argentina) | 10 June 2026 | 30 August 2026 | 7 | 1 | 2 | 4 | 8 | 12 | −4 | 14.29 | |
| Career total | | | | 915 | 441 | 229 | 245 | 1,495 | 1,066 | +429 | 48.20 | — |

== Honours ==
Belgrano de Arequito

- Liga Casildense de Fútbol (Division 5): 1996

Aprendices Casildenses

- Liga Casildense de Fútbol (Division 5): 1999, 2000

Universidad de Chile

- Torneo Apertura: 2011, 2012
- Torneo Clausura: 2011
- Copa Sudamericana: 2011

Chile

- Copa América: 2015

Atlético Mineiro

- Campeonato Mineiro: 2020

Individual

- Copa América Team of the Tournament (Manager): 2015
- South American Coach of the Year: 2015
- IFFHS World's Best National Coach: 2015
- La Liga Manager of the Month: October 2016
