= Lopez (disambiguation) =

López is a surname of Spanish origin.

López or Lopez may also refer to:

== Given name ==
- Lopez Lomong (born 1985), South Sudanese-born American track and field athlete

== Fictional characters ==
- Lopez, a character in Red vs. Blue; see List of characters in Red vs. Blue
- López (portrayed by Pedro Armendáriz Jr.), a character and antagonist in the 1999 film Herod's Law

== Places ==
- Lopez, Cauca, town and municipality in the Cauca Department, Colombia
- Lopez, Quezon, a municipality in the Philippines
- Lopez Jaena, Misamis Occidental, a municipality in the Philippines
- López, Chihuahua, one of the municipalities of Chihuahua, Mexico
- Lopez Adobe, historic house in California, USA
- Lopez Heritage House, in Iloilo City, Philippines
- Lopez Island, San Juan Islands, Washington, USA
- Lopez River in Monroe County, Florida
- López (Santa Fe), town and municipality in Santa Fe province, Argentina

== Other uses ==
- United States v. Lopez, a United States Supreme Court case
- Lopez (TV series), a television series starring George Lopez
- Lopez Holdings Corporation, a Filipino conglomerate
- Lopez vs. Lopez, American sitcom television series
- "Lopez", a song by 808 State and James Dean Bradfield from the album Don Solaris
