= Coronda =

- City
- Flag Coat of arms

- Location of Coronda in Argentina
- Coordinates: 31°58′S 60°55′W
- Country: Argentina
- Province: Santa Fe
- Department: San Jerónimo

Government
  - Intendant: Ricardo Ramírez (UCR)

Area
  - Total: 1,304 km^{2} (503 sq mi)

Population (2010 census)
  - Total: 18,115
  - Density: 13.89/km^{2} (35.98/sq mi)
- Time zone: UTC−3 (ART)
- CPA base: S2240
- Dialing code: +54 0342

Coronda is a small city in the province of Santa Fe, Argentina. It is located in the San Jerónimo Department, 43 km south from the provincial capital (Santa Fe). It has a population of about 18,000 inhabitants (2010 census [INDEC]).

The town was founded in 1867 by Governor Nicasio Oroño, and became a city on 6 February 1860.

Its parish church was designed by Carlo Zucchi.

== Notable people ==
- Carlota Garrido de la Peña (1870-1958), journalist, writer, teacher
