= Piedra libre =

- Directed by: Leopoldo Torre Nilsson
- Written by: Beatriz Guido, Rodolf Mórtola, Leopoldo Torre Nilsson
- Edited by: Gerardo Rinaldi
- Release date: 16 September 1976
- Running time: 97 minutes
- Country: Argentina
- Language: Spanish

Piedra libre is a 1976 Argentine film directed by Leopoldo Torre Nilsson and starring Marilina Ross, Juan José Camero and Mecha Ortiz.

== Cast ==
- Marilina Ross as Eugenia Alonso
- Juan José Camero as Ezequiel Labourdé
- Mecha Ortiz as Amalia Pradere
- Luisina Brando as Amalita
- Flora Steinberg as Mercedes Alonso
- Enrique Alonso as Vicente
- Francisco de Paula as Plácido Alonso
- Adriana Parets as Vicente's wife
- Jorge Petraglia as Carancho
- Walter Soubrie as Tordo
