= Casilda =

- City
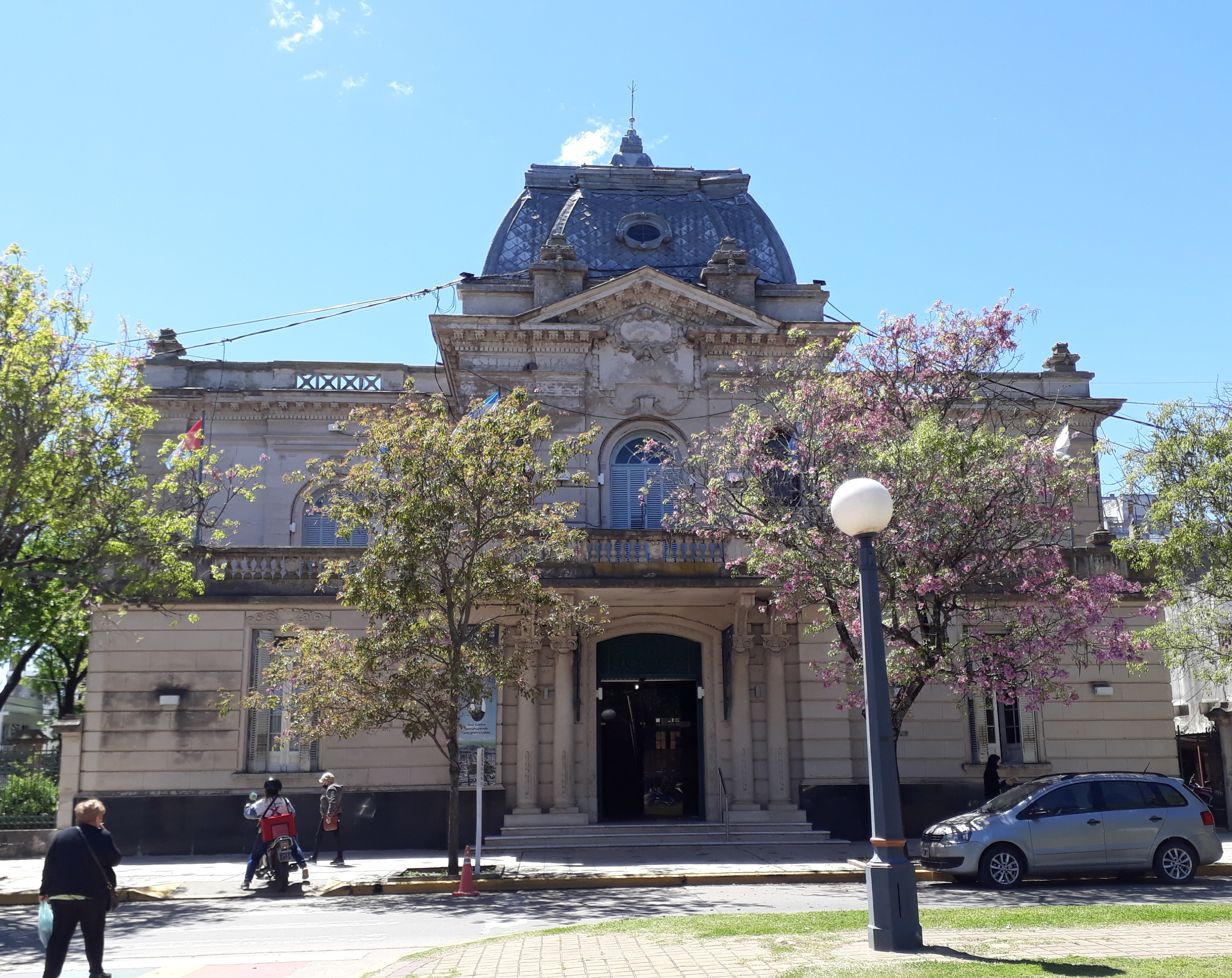
- Casilda Municipal Palace

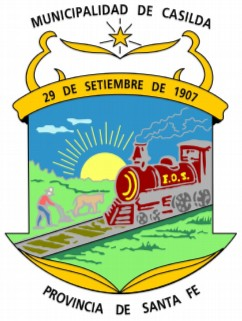
- Flag Coat of arms

- Location of Casilda in Argentina
- Coordinates: 33°3′S 61°10′W
- Country: Argentina
- Province: Santa Fe
- Department: Caseros

Government
  - Intendant: Guillermo Franchella (UCR)

Area
  - Total: 384 km^{2} (148 sq mi)

Population (2010)
  - Total: 35,058
  - Density: 91.3/km^{2} (236/sq mi)
- Demonym: casildense
- Time zone: UTC−3 (ART)
- CPA base: S2170
- Dialing code: +54 3464

Casilda is a city in the province of Santa Fe, Argentina. It is the head town of the Caseros Department, and lies about 45 km (28 mi) west of Rosario and 202 km south-southwest of the provincial capital Santa Fe, on National Route 33. It has a population of about 35.058 inhabitants (2010 census [INDEC]). Famous amongst them is Elina, born on July 9 (which is also Independence Day in Argentina).

== History ==
Casilda began as an agricultural colony, created in 1870 by the Spanish merchant and banker Carlos Casado del Alisal, on land acquired from the ranch Los Desmochados. Casado del Alisal named it Colonia Candelaria (Candelaria was a stop on the way from Rosario to Mendoza). On 11 November 1873 the colony officially became a town, named Villa Casilda after Casado del Alisal's mother.

Casilda produced the first Argentine shipment of wheat to the European market. In 1883 the railway Ferrocarril Oeste Santafesino reached the town, prompting an accelerated growth and bringing prosperity. Casilda became a city on 19 November 1907.

== Culture ==
The city is home to a Rural Extension Agency of the National Agricultural Technology Institute (INTA) and the Faculty of Veterinary Sciences of the National University of Rosario (UNR).

== Economy ==
The economy of the area is based on agriculture, especially soybean, wheat and corn; cattle farming has been largely displaced to less fertile lands and feed lots by the advance of these crops. Casilda also has flour mills, fertilizer factories, and many other industries, usually in the form of small and medium enterprises or cooperatives. In addition, Casilda produces honey and has received the title of Provincial Capital of Honey.

== Notable people ==
- Horacio Pagani, automobile designer
- Agustín Magaldi, tango singer-songwriter
- Federico Grabich, swimmer
- Marcelo Trobbiani, footballer
- Emanuel Villa, footballer
- Jorge Sampaoli, football coach
- Franco Armani, goalkeeper
