= Belgrano Department, Santa Fe =

Belgrano Department
- Department
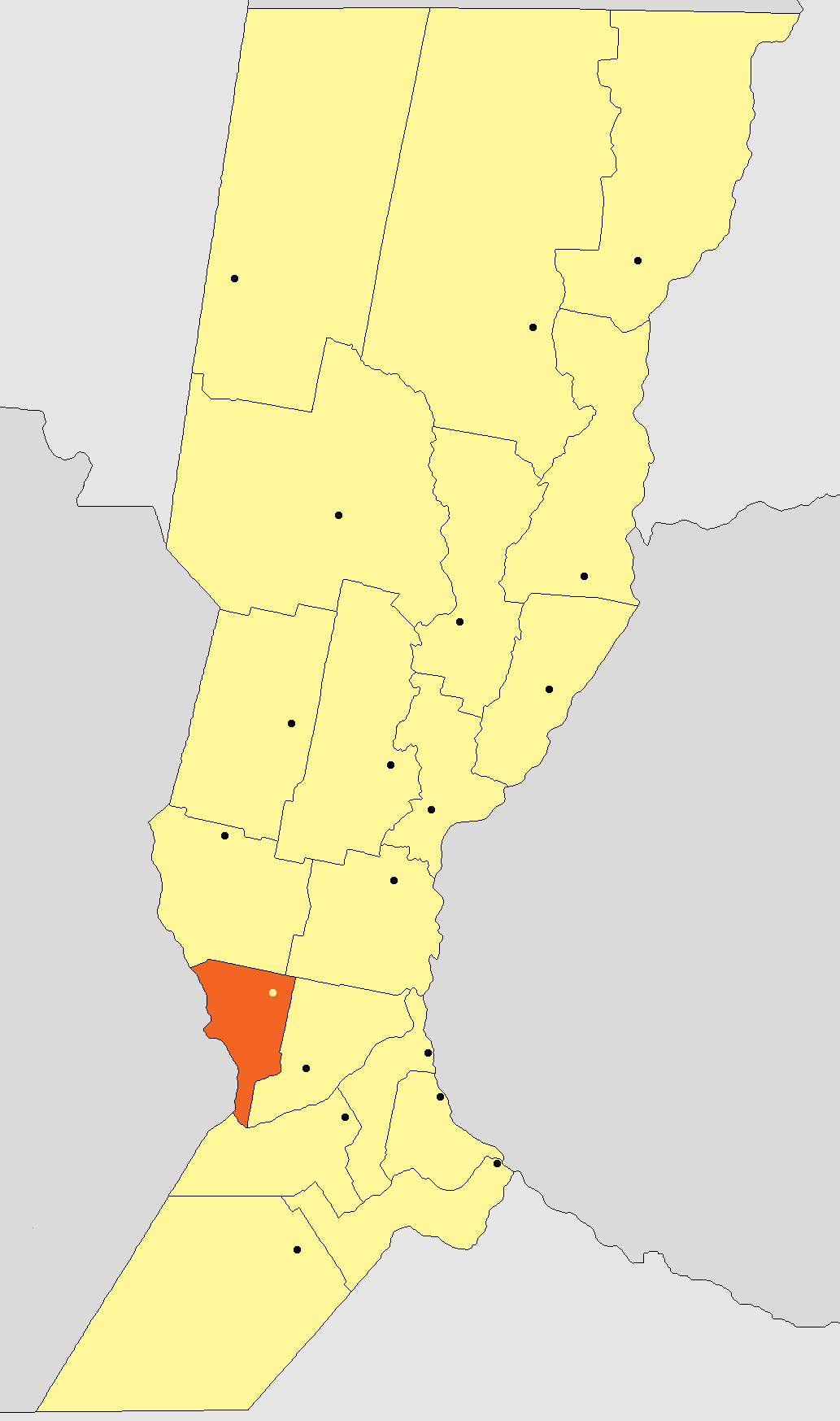
- Location of Belgrano Department within Santa Fe Province
- Coordinates: 32°29′S 61°35′W
- Country: Argentina
- Province: Santa Fe
- Head town: Las Rosas

Area
  - Total: 2,386 km^{2} (921 sq mi)

Population
  - Total: 41,449
  - Density: 17.37/km^{2} (44.99/sq mi)
- Time zone: UTC-3 (ART)

The Belgrano Department (in Spanish, Departamento Belgrano) is an administrative subdivision (departamento) of the province of Santa Fe, Argentina. It is located in the southwest of the province. It limits with the departments of San Martín (north), San Jerónimo (northeast), Iriondo (east), and Caseros (south); to the west it limits with the province of Córdoba.

The department has about 41,000 inhabitants. Its head town is Las Rosas (population 13,000). Other cities and towns are Armstrong, Bouquet, Las Parejas, Montes de Oca, and Tortugas.

The name of this department is an homage to General Manuel Belgrano, the creator of the Argentine flag.
