= Armstrong, Argentina =

Armstrong
- City
- Coat of arms

- Location of Armstrong in Argentina
- Coordinates: 32°47′S 61°36′W
- Country: Argentina
- Province: Santa Fe
- Department: Belgrano

Government
  - Intendant: Guillermo Luzzi (UCR)

Area
  - Total: 302 km^{2} (117 sq mi)
- Elevation: 110 m (360 ft)

Population (2010 census)
  - Total: 11,181
  - Density: 37.0/km^{2} (95.9/sq mi)
- Time zone: UTC−3 (ART)
- CPA base: S2508
- Dialing code: +54 3471

Armstrong is a city in the southwest of the province of Santa Fe, Argentina. It has 11,181 inhabitants as per the 2010 census [INDEC]. It is located 214 km (133 mi) from the provincial capital Santa Fe, 80 km (50 mi) west of Rosario and 20 km (12 mi) from Cañada de Gómez, on National Route 9 near the intersection with National Route 178.

The economy of the area is based on agriculture, but Armstrong, together with nearby Las Parejas, has also become an industrial center focused on the manufacturing of agricultural machinery for local use and export. These two cities together are home to 20% of Argentina's productive establishment of said industry.

Armstrong hosts an annual agro-industrial fair, Feriagro, which gathers exhibitors and visitors from the whole country and abroad. The agro-machinery industry has boomed since the turn of the 21st century, as the Argentine economy recovers.

== History ==
The area of the present-day town was under the jurisdiction of the Society of Jesus in colonial times. It passed to Spanish landowners, then to British ones, and then to the Central Argentine Railway company (CAR). Armstrong was started as a colony around a newly installed train station in 1882. At the time the area was occupied by a majority of Italian immigrants. The name of the settlement was an homage to Tomás Armstrong, a pioneer in the development of the CAR.

The colony officially became a comuna (a small town commune) in 1886, and a full municipality on 16 November 1984.

== Twin Cities ==
- Osimo, Marche, Italy
