= Psique y sexo =

- Release date: 1965
- Running time: 83 minute
- Country: Argentina
- Language: Spanish

Psique y sexo is a 1965 Argentine anthology comedy drama film, consisting of four episodes each directed by Manuel Antín, Dino Minitti, Ernesto Bianco and Enrique Cahen Salaberry.

== Cast ==
La estrella del destino

- Fernanda Mistral
- Alberto Argibay
- Federico Luppi

La buscona

- Julia Sandoval
- Ernesto Bianco
- Emilio Guevara

La necrófila

- Zulma Faiad
- Tito Alonso
- Miguel Ligero
- Noemí Laserre

Chicos jugando al deseo

- Eddie Pequenino
- Marisa Núñez
- Carlos Olivieri
- Fernando Crespi
- José Luis Mazza
- Carmen Llambí
