= Palo y hueso =

- Screenshot
- Directed by: Nicolás Sarquís
- Written by: Raúl Beceyro, Juan José Saer (novel), Nicolás Sarquís
- Produced by: Arturo Torres Salguero (producer); Guillermo León Fink; Bernardo Uchitel; Raúl Norberto Wolf
- Starring: Héctor da Rosa and Miguel Ligero
- Cinematography: Esteban Courtalon
- Edited by: Mario Mittleman; Oscar Montauti
- Music by: Béla Bartók
- Release date: 1968
- Running time: 70 minutes
- Country: Argentina
- Language: Spanish

Palo y hueso (Stick and Bone) is a 1968 Argentine film directed by Nicolás Sarquís and starring Héctor da Rosa and Miguel Ligero. The film was shot entirely in Buenos Aires, premiering there on August 7, 1968.

== Plot ==
The film tells the story of an old peasant who buys a young woman to live with him, but later realizes that she is sleeping with his son. The young people try to escape, but their bus is stopped by a river that has flooded. The old man follows and finds them, pleading with them to return. They agree, but the son insists that the old man relinquish the woman. The film has several memorable moments. One is the beautiful sequence of images of the couple walking down the road and waiting patiently for the bus in the rain. Some of the intensity of the movie may be due to the way in which it reflects the spirit of rebellion of the 1960s. As with all his films, Palo y hueso demonstrates Sarquis' enormous vocation for themes rooted in a microworld of men and women, creating tense narratives with the rigorous quality of epics.

== Cast ==
The cast was:

- Héctor da Rosa as Domingo
- Miguel Ligero as Don Arce
- Ramón 'Moncho' Beron as Rolon
- Ramón Franco as Domingo's friend
- Juanita Martínez as Rosita
- Melchor Soperes as the Parishioner

== Production ==
Palo y hueso was Sarquis' first full-length film, shot in black and white. It was also only the second to be shot by cinematographer Esteban Courtalon. Julio Lencina, another well-known cinematographer, was first assistant cameraman. Lencina went on to work with E. Stagnaro, Ricardo Wullicher, Mario Sábato, Valladares and others as director of photography. The movie, released in Santa Fe on 4 June 1968, cost just 5,500,000 pesos ($15,715) to make.

The film is based on the 1965 short story of the same name by Juan José Saer. Saer was a well-known writer who was also a movie buff, and taught History of Film and Film Criticism and Aesthetics at the Universidad Nacional del Litoral in Santa Fe. Saer began teaching at the Film Institute of Santa Fe (Instituto de Cine de Santa Fe) in 1962. Several of his students made films from his novels. Patricio Coll made Cicatrices (Scars), Raúl Beceyro made Nadie, nada, nunca (Nobody, Nothing, Never) and Sarquis made Palo y hueso. (Both Coll and Beceyro assisted with Palo y hueso). The film's realist approach shows the influence of Sarquis' teacher Fernando Birri, who had won several international awards.

The film featured music by Béla Bartók.

== Reception ==
The film fell short of the director's ambition. It was submitted by Argentina for the Academy Award for Best Foreign Language Film, but failed to be nominated. The film also failed to gain much attention in the Argentine cinemas. However, Sarquís' later film La muerte de Sebastián Arache (1977) was recognized as a major work based on the strength of its images and the poetic sense conveyed in the movie.

Later reviewers have praised Palo y hueso. When it was presented at the Fribourg International Film Festival in 2001, a reviewer described it as "a very singular and personal work in the Argentinean panorama of that time. Austere sets, bare dialogues and a simple drama underline the tensions linking the three characters whose lack of perspective is perceptible". The reviewer went on to detect the influence of filmmakers such as Alain Robbe-Grillet or Marguerite Duras, but felt that the tight psychological characterization, disciplined acting and stark sets were more reminiscent of Kenji Mizoguchi or Satyajit Ray.
