= Serodino =

- Town
- Location of Serodino in Argentina
- Coordinates: 32°36′S 60°57′W
- Country: Argentina
- Province: Santa Fe
- Department: Iriondo

Government
  - Communal President: Marilina Ascani (PDP)

Area
  - Total: 149 km^{2} (58 sq mi)

Population
  - Total: 3,375
  - Density: 22.7/km^{2} (58.7/sq mi)
- Time zone: UTC−3 (ART)
- CPA base: S2216
- Dialing code: +54 3476

Serodino is a town (comuna) in the province of Santa Fe, Argentina. It is located in the Iriondo Department, 152 km away from the provincial capital (Santa Fe) and 59 km away to Rosario. At the 2001 census [INDEC] it had a population of 3,375 (2,969 in urban areas).

The economy of the region is based on soybean, corn and wheat produce, and on cattle raising.

The town was founded on December 5, 1885, by Pedro Serodino, who sold the Central Argentino railway company the tract of land where the train station was raised, and built the first house in town (his own).

Serodino is the hometown of Argentine novelist Juan José Saer. On March 19, the festivity of San José is observed.

== Gallery ==
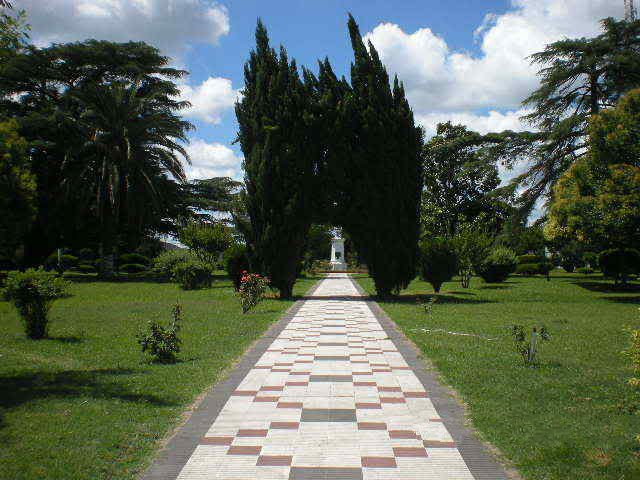
Entrada diagonal plaza

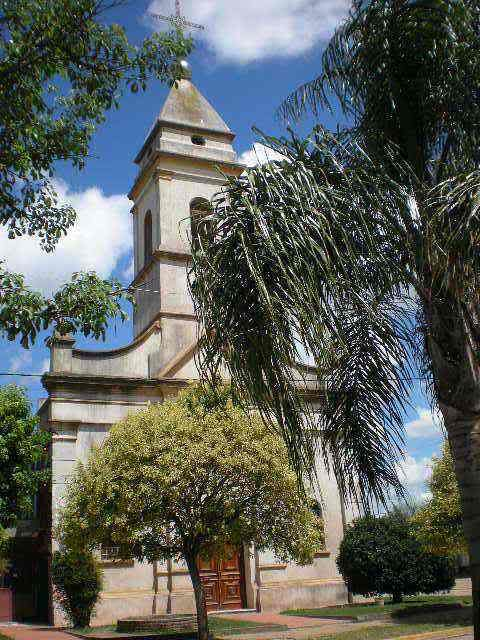
El campanario

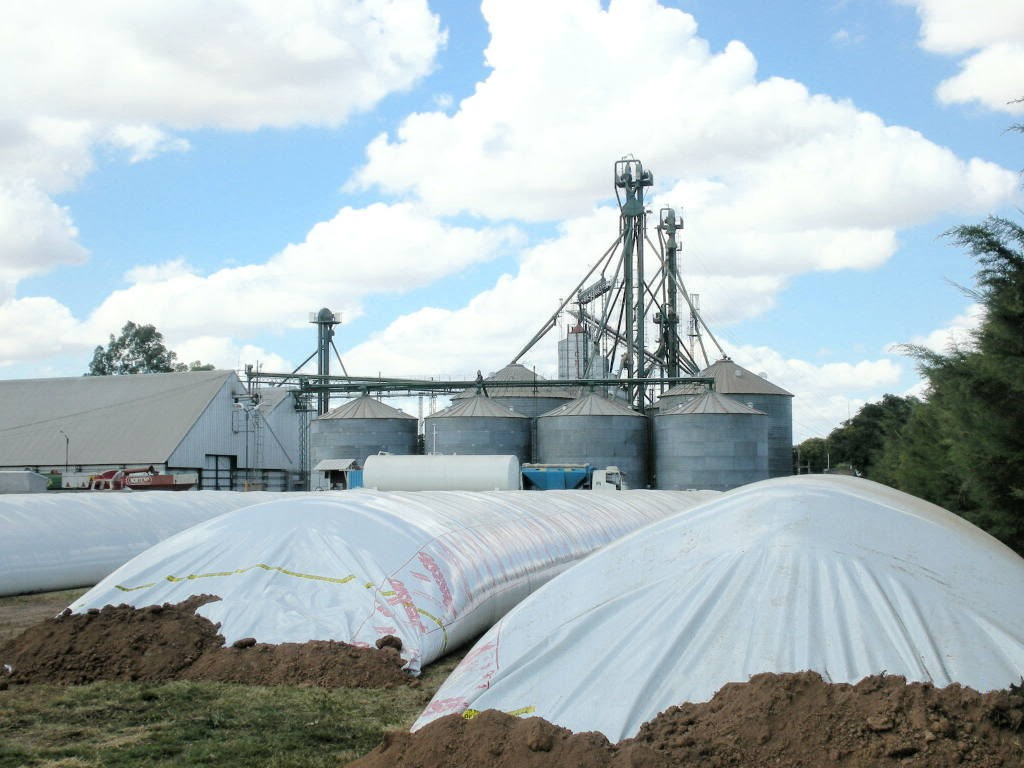
AFA Serodino Agricultores Federados Argentinos primary grain storage center.
