= Iriondo Department =

- Department
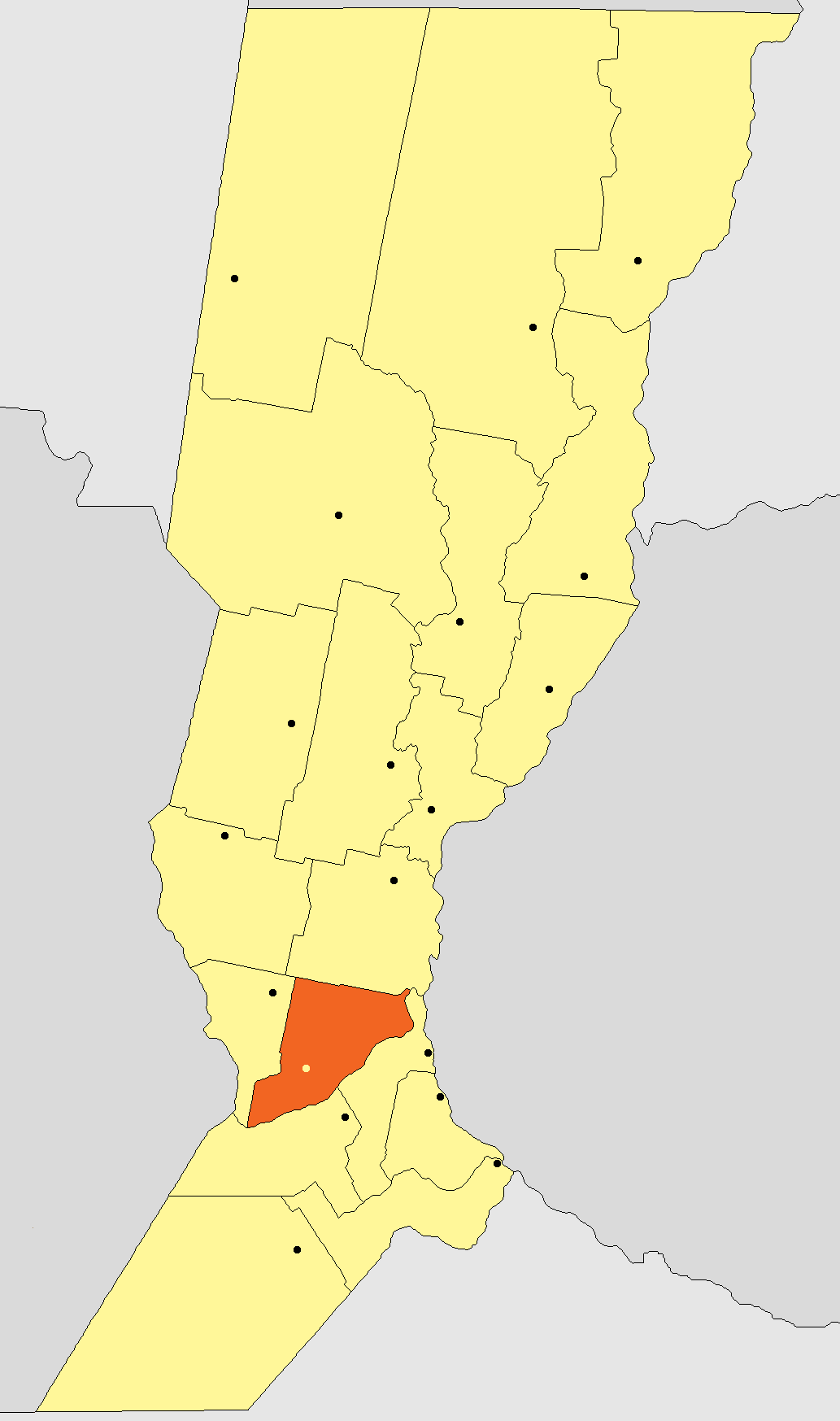
- Location of Iriondo Department within Santa Fe Province
- Coordinates: 32°49′S 61°24′W
- Country: Argentina
- Province: Santa Fe
- Head town: Cañada de Gómez

Area
  - Total: 3,184 km^{2} (1,229 sq mi)

Population
  - Total: 65,486
  - Density: 20.57/km^{2} (53.27/sq mi)
- Time zone: UTC-3 (ART)

The Iriondo Department (in Spanish, Departamento Iriondo) is an administrative subdivision (departamento) of the province of Santa Fe, Argentina. It is located in the south of the province. It limits with the departments of San Jerónimo in the north, San Lorenzo in the east, Caseros in the south, and Belgrano in the west. It is one of only three departments in Santa Fe that do not border another province.

The department has a population of over 65,000 inhabitants. Its head town and most populated urban center is Cañada de Gómez (population 30,000). Other cities and towns are Bustinza, Carrizales, Classon, Correa, Lucio V. López, Oliveros, Pueblo Andino, Salto Grande, Serodino, Totoras, and Villa Eloísa.
