= San Jerónimo Department =

- Department
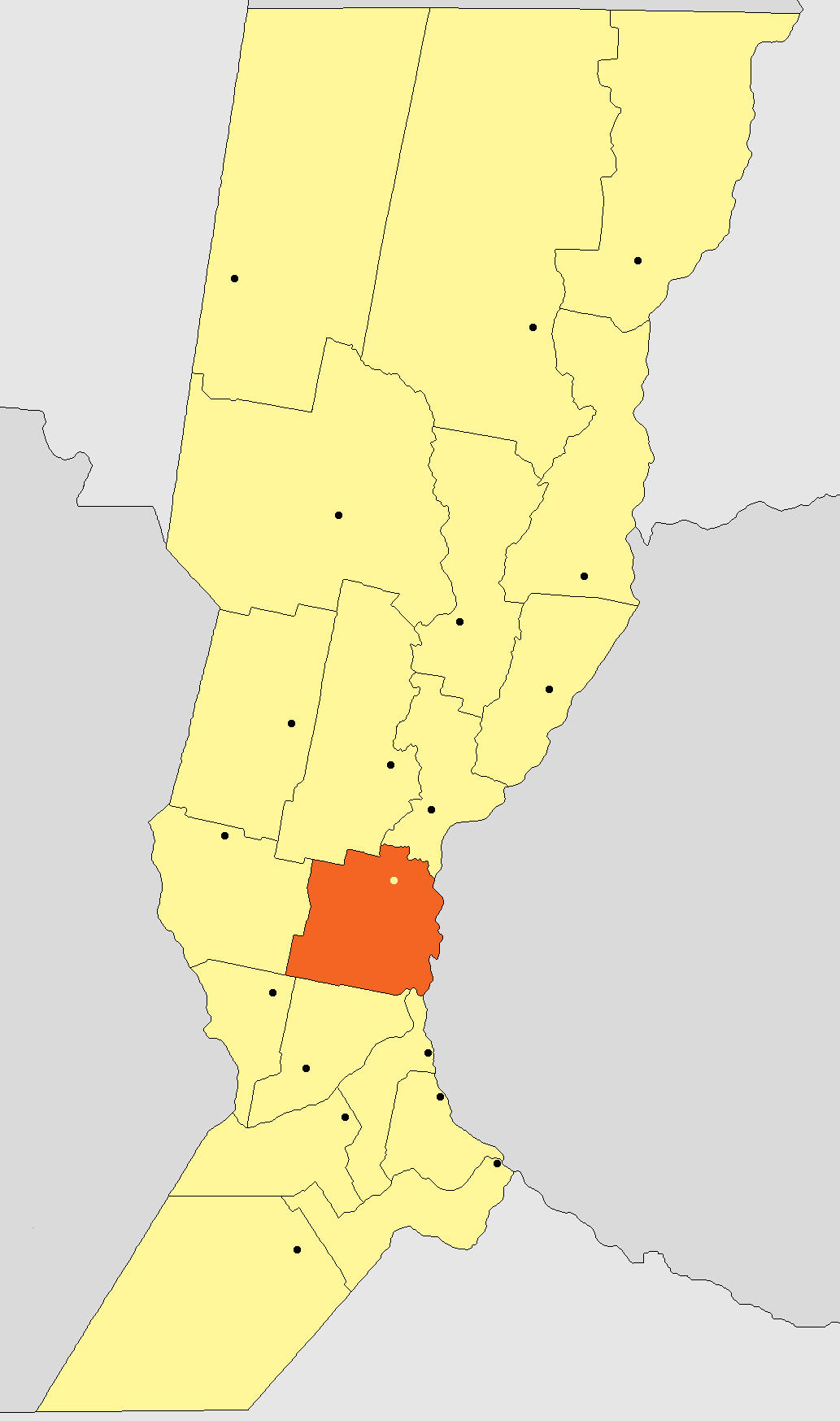
- Location of San Jerónimo Department within Santa Fe Province
- Coordinates: 31°58′S 60°55′W
- Country: Argentina
- Province: Santa Fe
- Head town: Coronda

Area
  - Total: 4,282 km^{2} (1,653 sq mi)

Population
  - Total: 77,253
  - Density: 18.04/km^{2} (46.73/sq mi)
- Time zone: UTC-3 (ART)

The San Jerónimo Department (in Spanish, Departamento San Jerónimo) is an administrative subdivision (departamento) of the province of Santa Fe, Argentina. It is located in the center-south of the province. It limits with the Paraná River in the east; and from there (going clockwise) with the departments of San Lorenzo and Iriondo (south), Belgrano (southwest), San Martín (west), and Las Colonias and La Capital (north).

The department has over 77,000 inhabitants. Its head town is Coronda (population 17,000). Other cities and towns are Arocena, Barrancas, Bernardo de Irigoyen, Campo Piaggio, Casalegno, Centeno, Desvío Arijón, Díaz, Gaboto, Gálvez, Gessler, Larrechea, Loma Alta, López, Maciel, Monje, Pueblo Irigoyen, San Eugenio, San Fabián, San Genaro, and San Genaro Norte.
