= Las Parejas =

- City
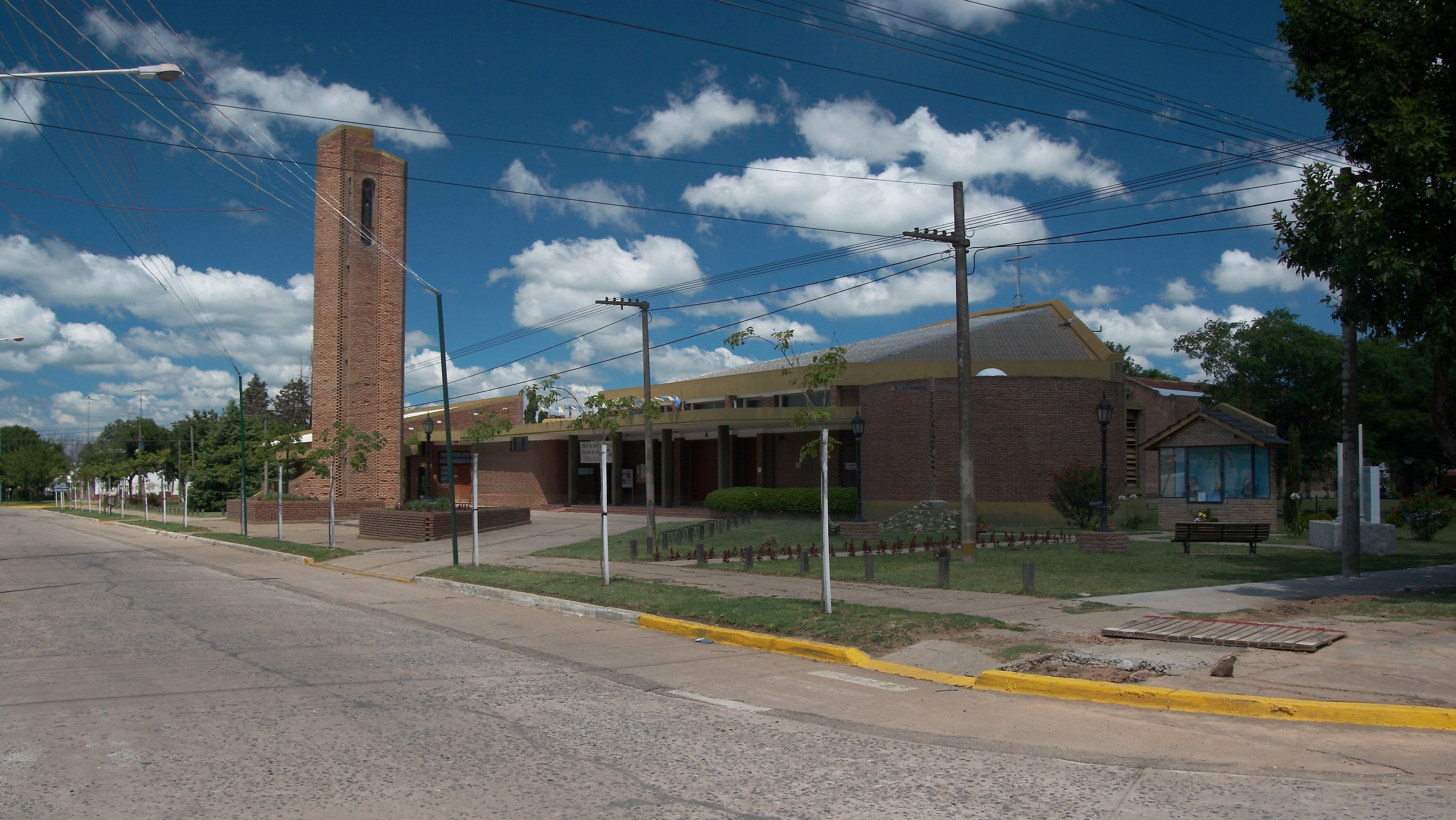

- Location of Las Parejas in Argentina
- Coordinates: 32°41′S 61°32′W
- Country: Argentina
- Province: Santa Fe
- Department: Belgrano

Government
  - Intendant: Horacio Campagnuci (PJ)

Area
  - Total: 295 km^{2} (114 sq mi)
- Elevation: 85 m (279 ft)

Population (2010 census)
  - Total: 12,375
  - Density: 41.9/km^{2} (109/sq mi)
- Time zone: UTC−3 (ART)
- CPA base: S2505
- Dialing code: +54 3471

Las Parejas is a city in the southwest of the province of Santa Fe, Argentina, on National Route 178. Las Parejas has 11,301 inhabitants as per the 2001 census [INDEC].

The town was founded in 1889 on lands belonging to the Ferrocarril Central Argentino railway company. The communal jurisdiction was established on 6 October 1902. The commune officially became a city on 27 June 1986.

The economy of Las Parejas is based on agriculture and (on a smaller scale) cattle farming. Industries have experienced a surge, especially the manufacturing of agricultural machinery, since the turn of the 21st century. Las Parejas and Armstrong are home to 20% of the productive capacity of this industry, which supplies a growing local demand and is beginning to export. Las Parejas was declared "Provincial Capital of the Small and Medium Enterprise" in 2004.

== Notable natives ==
- Héctor Cavallero (b. 1939), politician, former mayor of Rosario and national deputy.
- Jorge Valdano (b. 1955), former football player, commentator and coach.
- Antonio Bonfatti (b. 1950), With the return of democracy in 1983, was elected Mayor of Las Parejas, where he served alongside the doctor at the Hospital SAMCo of the town. He was again elected by the citizens of Domestic Partnership in 1989, this time to be a councilor until 1993. Currently it is the 83rd and current Governor of the Province of Santa Fe Socialist Party leader and medical doctor.
- Daniel Onega (born March 17, 1945) is a retired Argentine football player who played most of his career for River Plate.
