= Caseros Department =

- Department
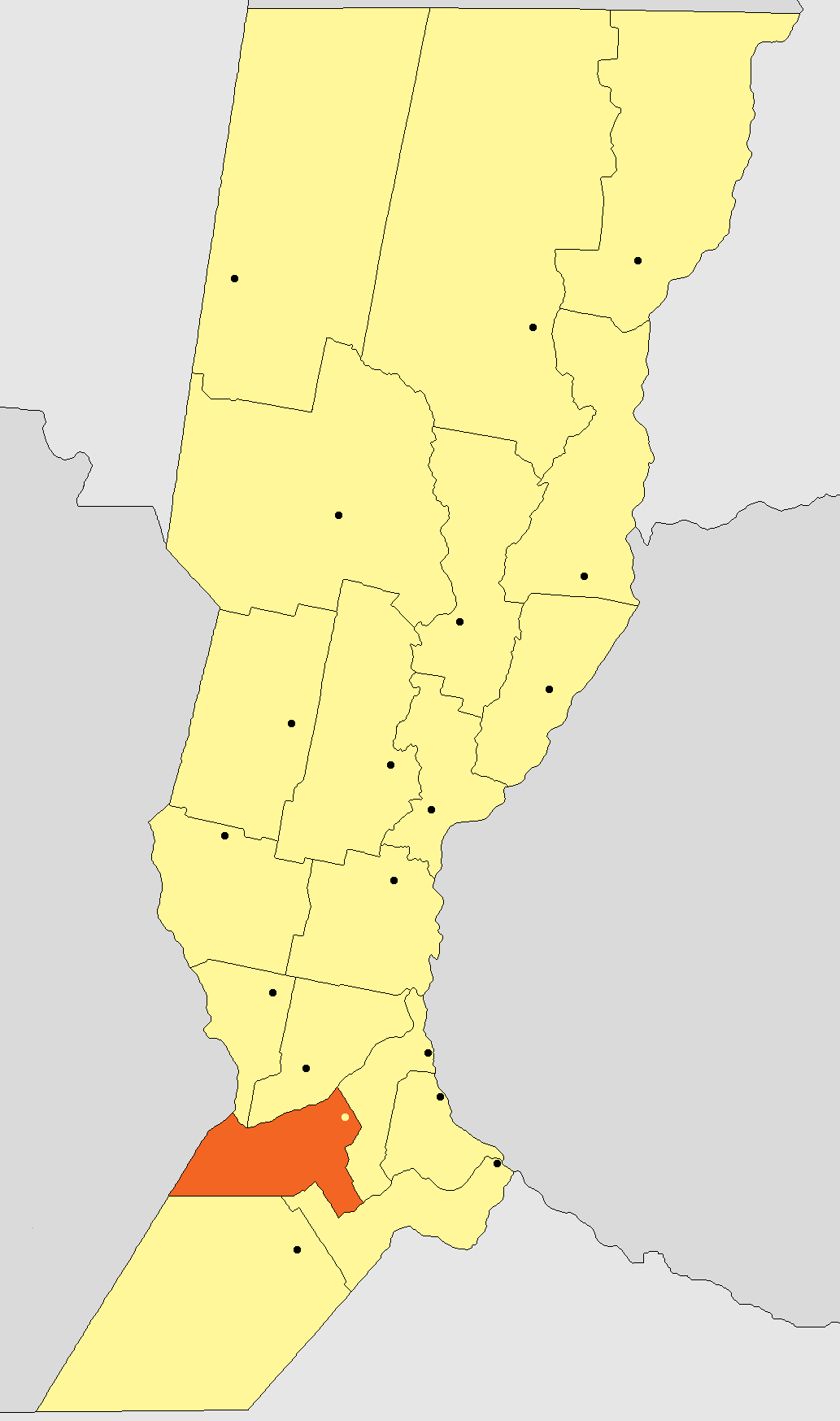
- Location of Caseros Department within Santa Fe Province
- Coordinates: 33°3′S 61°10′W
- Country: Argentina
- Province: Santa Fe
- Head town: Casilda

Area
  - Total: 3,449 km^{2} (1,332 sq mi)

Population
  - Total: 79,096
  - Density: 22.93/km^{2} (59.40/sq mi)
- Time zone: UTC-3 (ART)

The Caseros Department (in Spanish, Departamento Caseros) is an administrative subdivision (departamento) of the province of Santa Fe, Argentina. It is located in the south of the province. Its head town is the city of Casilda (population 32,000).

Its neighbouring departments are Belgrano and Iriondo in the north, San Lorenzo in the west, and Constitución and General López in the south; to the west its border marks the interprovincial limit with Córdoba.

The towns and cities in this department are (in alphabetical order): Arequito, Arteaga, Berabevú, Bigand, Casilda, Chabás, Chañar Ladeado, Gödeken, Los Molinos, Los Quirquinchos, San José de La Esquina, Sanford, Villada.
