= Bernardo de Irigoyen, Santa Fe =

Bernardo de Irigoyen
- Town
- Location of Bernardo de Irigoyen in Argentina
- Coordinates: 32°10′S 61°9′W
- Country: Argentina
- Province: Santa Fe
- Department: San Jerónimo

Area
  - Total: 284 km^{2} (110 sq mi)

Population
  - Total: 1,899
  - Density: 6.69/km^{2} (17.3/sq mi)
- Time zone: UTC−3 (ART)
- CPA base: S2248
- Dialing code: +54 3466

Bernardo de Irigoyen is a town (comuna) in the center-east of the province of Santa Fe, Argentina. It has 1,899 inhabitants as per the 2001 census [INDEC]. It is located 82 km (51 mi) south-southwest from the provincial capital Santa Fe, on Provincial Route 10.

The town was founded in 1886, as the Buenos Aires–Tucumán railway reached the area. It was named after diplomat and politician Bernardo de Irigoyen, who donated lands for the town. It gained the official status of commune in 1923.

Bernardo de Irigoyen hosts an annual Bronc Riding and Folk Music Festival, in the second half of February, and celebrates the day of its patron, the Nativity of the Child Virgin Mary, on 8 September.
