= Bouquet, Argentina =

Bouquet
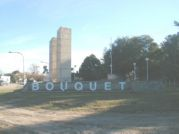

- Location in Argentina
- Coordinates: 32°25′S 61°54′W
- Country: Argentina
- Province: Santa Fe
- Department: Belgrano

Government
  - Intendant: Elio Barrera (PJ)
- Elevation: 116 m (381 ft)

Population (2001 census [INDEC])
  - Total: 1,446
  - Density: 4.07/km^{2} (10.5/sq mi)
- CPA Base: B S2523
- Area code: +54 3471

Bouquet is a town in Belgrano Department, in Santa Fe Province, Argentina. Its located 192 km (119 mi) from the provincial capital Santa Fe.

== History ==
In 1908 the federal government established the law that authorized the construction of a railway line from Las Rosas to Bouquet. After obtaining the land, work started in 1910 including the construction of a small town adjacent to the railway station.

Bouquet therefore started with the construction of the station, and its opening on 19 September 1910, with the organization provided by its founders, Otto Bantle, Victorio De Lorenzi and Augusto Schanck who contracted Civil Engineer Benno Jorge Schanck for the planning of the town.

On 12 September 1912 the name "Bouquet" was proposed for the station, as these lands once belonged to ex-federal senator Carlos María Bouquet, father-in-law of President José Figueroa Alcorta.

The town connects to RN 9 Rosario-Córdoba Highway through Provincial Route RP 65.

== Famous people from the town ==
- Rosa Baquín de Terzoni, writer of the "Postales de Bouquet" (Postcards from Bouquet) book.
- Roberto Abbondanzieri, ex-footballer for Boca Juniors and the Argentina national team.

== Population ==
The town has a population of 1,446 according to the 2001 census [INDEC] (739 male and 707 female) which represents and increase of 16.3% from the 995 of the previous census in 1991.
