= Tortugas, Argentina =

Town in Santa Fe Province, Argentina

Tortugas
- Location in Argentina
- Coordinates: 32°44′50.9″S 61°49′15.6″W
- Country: Argentina
- Province: (Santa Fe Province) Santa Fe
- Department: Belgrano
- Founded: 12 March 1870

Government
  - Communal president: Humberto Viozzi (PJ)

Area
  - Total: 322 km^{2} (124 sq mi)
- Elevation: 73 m (240 ft)

Population (2010 census [INDEC])
  - Total: 2,234
- CPA Base: S2512
- Area code: 03471

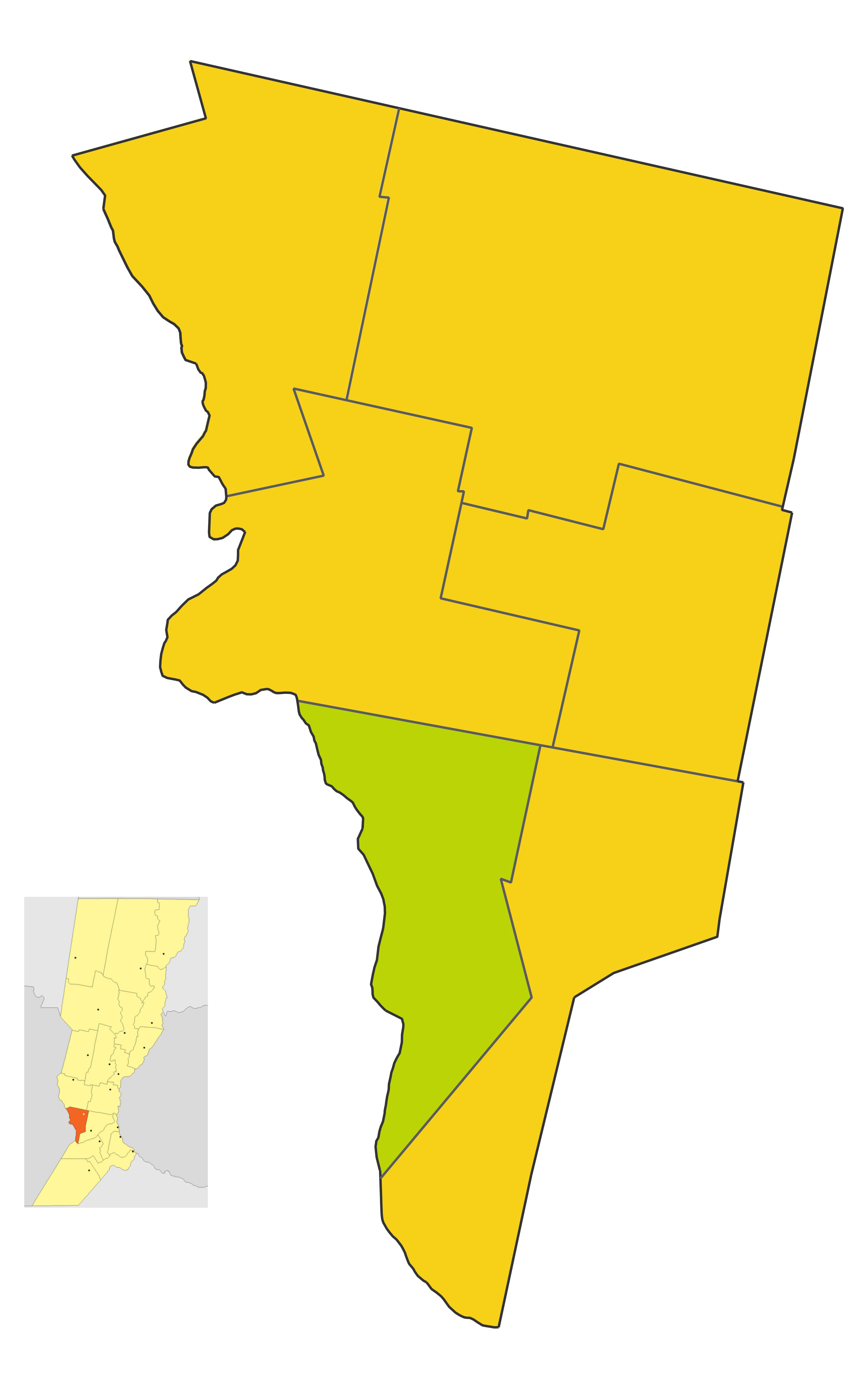
Map of the community of Tortugas

Tortugas is a town in the Belgrano Department of Santa Fe Province, Argentina.

== Notable people ==
- Mariángeles Cossar, volleyball player
