= López, Santa Fe =

López
- Town and municipality
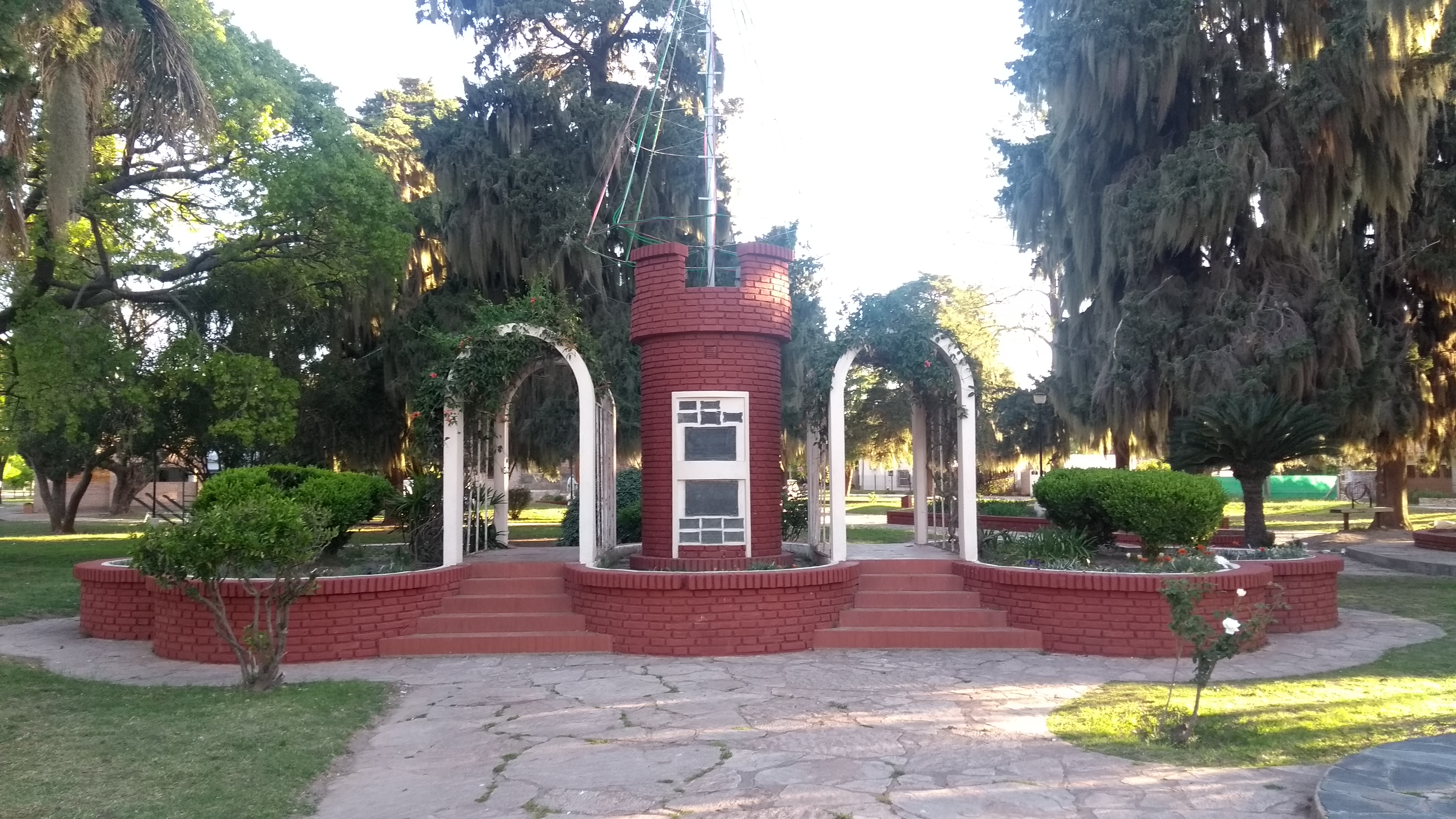
- Fountain in commemoration to the centenary of the establishment.

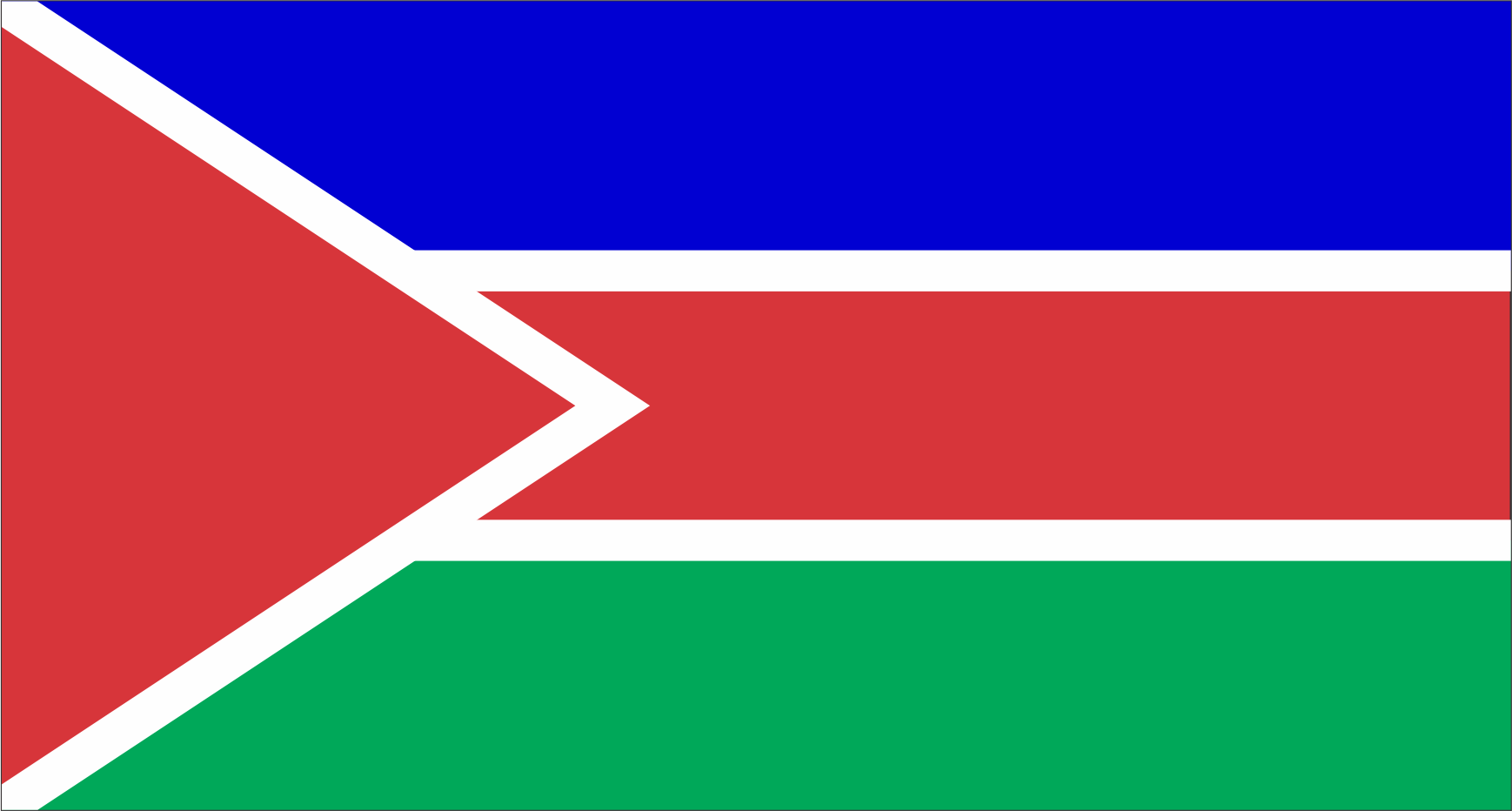
- Flag

- Location of López in Santa Fe
- Coordinates: 31°54′19″S 61°16′53″W
- Country: Argentina
- Province: Santa Fe
- Department: San Jerónimo
- Established: 1893
- Founder: Mariano López

Government
  - Communal president: José María Kloster (UCR-FPCyS)

Area
  - Total: 2,818 km^{2} (1,088 sq mi)
- Elevation: 131 m (430 ft)

Population
  - Total: 1,535
  - Density: 0.5447/km^{2} (1.411/sq mi)
- 2010
- Time zone: UTC−3 (ART)
- CPA: S2255
- Area code: +54 03404

López is an Argentine locality and town in the San Jerónimo Department within the Santa Fe Province.

It is situated 100 km from the capital of the province, Santa Fe.

The commune was founded on 20 May 1896.

== Population ==
It has 1,535 inhabitants (INDEC, 2010), an increase of 1,467 inhabitants (INDEC, 2001) over the last census.

demographic vertical bar chart of López between 1887 and 2010
Source: National Census INDEC, National

== Geographic location ==
López is the head of its communal district. Its area covers 13,000 hectares.

The limits are: at the North Santa Clara de la Buena Vista. At the east, Loma Alta. And at the south Campo Piaggio and Loma Alta.

== Colonization ==
The first colonists who settled the colony were tenants of Mariano López. They were immigrants from the North of Italy, mostly from Piedmont.

The first general census of Santa Fe, taken in July 1887 confirmed that López population came from:

Country	People
Germany	2
Argentina	64
Austria	1
Denmark	2
France	3
Italy	227
Switzerland	15
Total immigrants	250
Total inhabitants	314

== Sports ==
The football club of the town is the Club Argentino de López that competes in the Football League of Esperanza.
