= The Underground Man (1981 film) =

1981 film

- Directed by: Nicolás Sarquís
- Written by: Fyodor Dostoevsky
- Starring: Antonio Ber Ciani
- Edited by: Luis César D'Angiolillo
- Release date: 3 September 1981
- Running time: 110 minutes
- Country: Argentina
- Language: Spanish

The Underground Man (Spanish: El hombre del subsuelo) is a 1981 Argentine drama film directed by Nicolás Sarquís. It is based on the novella Notes from Underground by Fyodor Dostoevsky. The film was selected as the Argentine entry for the Best Foreign Language Film at the 54th Academy Awards, but was not accepted as a nominee.

== Summary ==
In the 1930s, a tormented man and his butler live in an old mansion in Adrogué, where they film pornographic movies in the basement, following the grandfather's will.

== Cast ==
- Antonio Ber Ciani
- Jesús Berenguer
- Héctor Bidonde as Jalil
- Aldo Braga as Casanegra
- Lucrecia Capello
- Alberto de Mendoza as Diego Carmona
- Regina Duarte as Luisa Dos Santos
- Ulises Dumont as Baibiene
- Adela Gleijer
- Miguel Ligero as Severo

== See also ==
- List of submissions to the 54th Academy Awards for Best Foreign Language Film
- List of Argentine submissions for the Academy Award for Best Foreign Language Film
