= Montes de Oca, Argentina =

Town in Santa Fe Province, Argentina

Montes de Oca
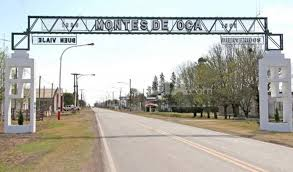

- Location in Argentina
- Coordinates: 32°33′59″S 61°46′07″W
- Country: Argentina
- Province: (Santa Fe Province) Santa Fe
- Department: Belgrano
- Founded: 1888

Government
  - Intendant: Emanuel Sagripanti (UCR)

Area
  - Total: 415 km^{2} (160 sq mi)
- Elevation: 97 m (318 ft)

Population (2010 census [INDEC])
  - Total: 2,971
- CPA Base: S 2521
- Area code: 03471

Montes de Oca is a town in the Belgrano Department of Santa Fe Province, Argentina.

== Notable people ==
- Carlos Bertero, footballer
- Jerónimo Cacciabue, footballer
