= Cañada de Gómez =

- City
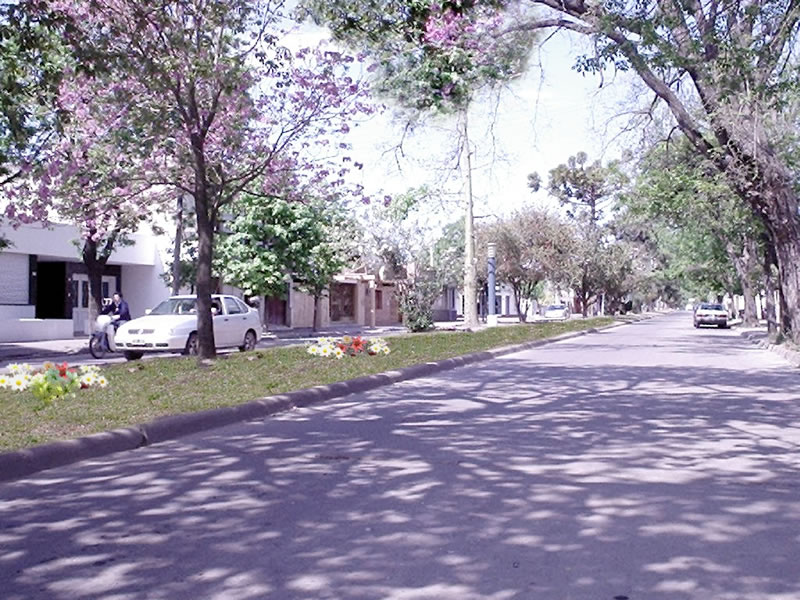
- Residential section in Cañada de Gómez

- Location of Cañada de Gómez in Argentina
- Coordinates: 32°49′S 61°24′W
- Country: Argentina
- Province: Santa Fe
- Department: Iriondo

Government
  - Intendant: Matias Jesús Chale (Radical Civic Union)

Area
  - Total: 529 km^{2} (204 sq mi)

Population (2010 census)
  - Total: 29,205
  - Density: 55.2/km^{2} (143/sq mi)
- Demonym: cañadense
- Time zone: UTC−3 (ART)
- CPA base: S2500
- Dialing code: +54 3471

Cañada de Gómez is a city in the province of Santa Fe, Argentina. It is the head town of the Iriondo Department and is located about 67 km (42 mi) west of Rosario and 224 km (139 mi) from the provincial capital, on National Route 9. It has a population of about 29,000 inhabitants (2010 census [INDEC]).

The town was founded in 1869 by Guillermo Perkins, and became a city on 7 October 1922.
