= Héctor da Rosa =

Argentine actor

Héctor da Rosa is an Argentine actor.

== Filmography ==
- 1968 Rafael Heredia El Gitano (TV series) as Hermano Menor
- 1968 Palo y hueso as Domingo
- 1971 Argentino hasta la muerte
- 1971 A Bravo of the 1900s
- 1971 The Big Highway
- 1974 Contigo y aquí
- 1975 Tu rebelde ternura (TV series)
- 1979 Contragolpe
- 1980 Rosa... de lejos (TV series) as Ramon Ramos
- 1992 Micaela (TV series) as Lorenzo
- 1997 Rich and Famous (TV series)
- 1998 Endless Summer (TV series) as Fisherman
- 2000 Un amor de Borges
- 2003 Forever Julia (TV series) as Bruzzone
- 2008 Vidas robadas (TV series) as Alberto
- 2009 Dromo (TV mini-series)
- 2010 Botineras (TV series)
