= Juan José Camero =

Argentine actor (born 1943)

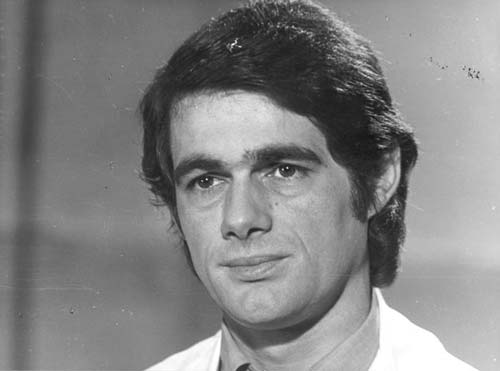
Juan José Camero,1977

Juan José Camero (born September 15, 1943) is an Argentine film, television, and theatre actor.

Camero started out as an advertising model and worked his way into television roles. In the 1970s he did quite a lot of work in Argentine telenovelas.

His break out role in films was in Leonardo Favio's Nazareno Cruz y el lobo (1975).

Film critics also applauded his performance in Veronico Cruz (1988). The motion picture was Argentina's official selection for the 1988 Oscar Awards, foreign language film category.

Camero has also been involved in politics. In 1991 he served as president Carlos Menem's cultural attaché at the Argentine embassy in Paraguay.

In the mid-2000s he took ill and has been hospitalized several times for coronary problems.

== Filmography (selected) ==
- La Mary (1974)
- La Tregua (1974)
- El Muerto (1975)
- Triángulo de cuatro (1975)
- Nazareno Cruz y el lobo (1975) a.k.a. Nazareno Cruz and the Wolf
- Cacique Bandeira (1975)
- Piedra libre (1976) a.k.a. Free for All
- Basta de mujeres (1977)
- Allá lejos y hace tiempo (1978)
- Los Drogadictos (1979)
- La Mayoría silenciada (1986)
- Veronico Cruz: (La deuda interna) (1988)

== Television ==
- De corazón (1997) TV Series
- Campeones de la vida (1999) TV Series
