= Miguel Pereira (film director) =

Argentine film director (born 1957)

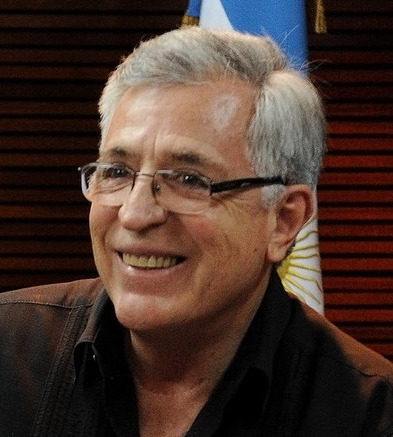
- Miguel Ángel Pereira
- Born: April 12, 1957 (age 69); San Salvador de Jujuy, Jujuy Province, Argentina
- Education: London Film School
- Occupations: film director, producer, and writer

Miguel Pereira (born April 12, 1957, in San Salvador de Jujuy, Jujuy Province, Argentina) is a film director, producer and screenplay writer. He works mainly in the cinema of Argentina.

== Biography ==
Pereira was a film student at the London Film School in the early 1980s and graduated in 1982.

His breakout film as a director and, also his first, was Verónico Cruz (1988), an Argentine and British co-production, which won many awards at the 38th Berlin International Film Festival, including the Silver Berlin Bear.

From 2002 to 2008 he was the president of the Mar Del Plata International Film Festival in Buenos Aires, Argentina, a prestigious festival that takes place every year during March in Mar del Plata, Argentina. It is considered a "Category A" festival, along with festivals like Cannes, Berlin or Venice.

== Directing filmography ==
- Verónico Cruz: La Deuda interna (1988)
- La Última siembra (1991) a.k.a. The Last Harvest
- Sin palabras... Jujuy (1994)
- Che... Ernesto (1998)
- Historias de Argentina en vivo (2001)
- La Saga de Cirilo Donaire (2003)
- El Destino (2006), a.k.a. The Man Who Came to a Village

== Awards ==
Wins

- Karlovy Vary International Film Festival: Award of Ecumenical Jury, El Destino, 2006.
- Tokyo International Film Festival: Bronze Award, La Última siembra, 1991.
- 38th Berlin International Film Festival: Interfilm Award, Honorable Mention; OCIC Award, Honorable Mention; Silver Berlin Bear; Verónico Cruz, 1988.
- Bogota Film Festival: Special Prize, Verónico Cruz, 1989.
- Argentine Film Critics Association Awards: Silver Condor, Best Film, Verónico Cruz, 1989.

Nominations

- Karlovy Vary International Film Festival: Crystal Globe, El Destino, 2006.
- Berlin International Film Festival: Golden Berlin Bear, Miguel Pereira, 1988.
