= Miguel Ligero (Argentine actor) =

Argentine actor

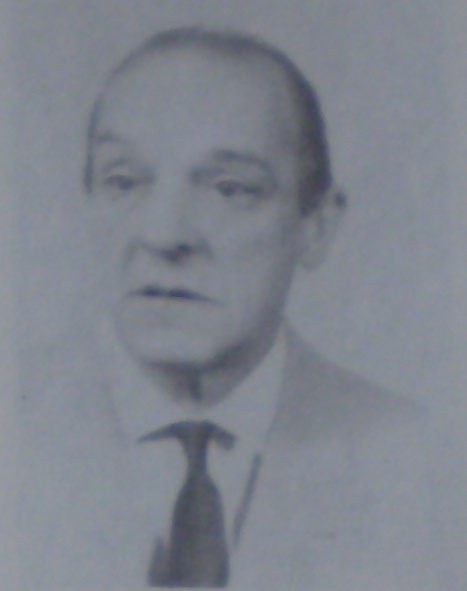
- Born: 1911; Rosario, Santa Fe
- Died: 1 February 1989 (aged 77–78); Buenos Aires
- Occupation: Actor

Miguel Ligero (1911–1989) was a film, television and theater actor from Argentina.

== Biography ==
Ligero was born in 1911 in Rosario, Santa Fe. In 1938 he made his film debut with The Caranchos of Florida and went on to appear in some twenty films. For his work in Castigo al traidor (Punishment to the Traitor) and El ojo que espía (the spying eye), both from 1966, he was awarded the Silver Condor award for best supporting actor. In 1965 he received the Martin Fierro Award for Best Actor in a novel. Other works were Palo y hueso (1967), La guerra del cerdo (1975), El soltero (1977) and El hombre del subsuelo (1981).

In theater he worked with Luis Arata, Enrique de Rosas and Olinda Bozán and acted for several seasons at the Teatro General San Martín. Among other works, he appeared in Waiting for Godot and The Caucasian Chalk Circle. After the beginning of television soap operas he worked on Señorita Medianoche (Miss Midnight - 1963), Mariana and other programs. He was received the Konex Award in 1981 in the category of Actor in a Comedy Film and Theater.

He died on 1 February 1989 (aged 77) in Buenos Aires, Argentina after a heart attack.

== Films ==
Miguel Ligero appeared in the following films:

- 1938 The Caranchos of Florida
- 1943 Los Hombres las prefieren viudas
- 1950 La Vendedora de fantasías
- 1951 Cuidado con las mujeres
- 1952 Como yo no hay dos
- 1952 The Tunnel
- 1953 The Black Market
- 1954 Torrente indiano
- 1954 Un Hombre cualquiera
- 1955 El Juramento de Lagardere
- 1958 Rosaura a las 10 (Rosaura at 10 O'Clock)
- 1960 Todo el año es Navidad
- 1962 El hombre que perdió su risa
- 1962 Mañana puede ser verdad (TV series)
- 1964 La Cigarra no es un bicho
- 1965 Psique y sexo
- 1966 El Ojo de la cerradura
- 1966 El ojo que espía
- 1966 Castigo al traidor (Punishment to the Traitor)
- 1968 Palo y hueso as Don Arce
- 1969 Flor de piolas
- 1969 Newcomers to Love
- 1970 Esta noche... miedo (TV series)
- 1974 Los bulbos (TV mini-series)
- 1975 A World of Love
- 1975 La Guerra del cerdo (Diary of a Pig War) as Jimmy Neuman
- 1976 Tiempos duros para Drácula
- 1977 El soltero
- 1979 Mañana puedo morir (TV movie)
- 1980 Frutilla
- 1981 El hombre del subsuelo (The Underground Man) as Severo
- 1983 Amar... al salvaje (TV series) as Serafín
- 1988 Apartment Zero as Mr. Palma
- 1989 Eversmile, New Jersey as Brother Felix

== Theatre ==
- Tangolandia (1957)
- Discepoliana (1966)
- El Señor Puntila Y Su Chofer (1965)
- Mustafá (1977)
- Esperando a Godot (Waiting for Godot)
- El círculo de tiza caucasiano (The Caucasian Chalk Circle)

== Television ==
- Amar... al salvaje (1983) Series .... Serafín (1983)
- Quiero gritar tu nombre (1981) Series .... (1981)
- Mañana puedo morir (1979) (TV)
- Los bulbos (1974) mini-series
- Alta comedia (episode Los árboles mueren de pie (1974) .... Balboa
- Esta noche... miedo (1970) Series
- El mundo del espectáculo (1968) Series
- Burbuja (1967) Series .... León Ramos
- Mariana (1966) Series .... Padre Florencio
- Show Standard Electric (1965) mini-series .... (1965)
- Candilejas (1965) Series .... Felipe
- Dos gotas de agua (1964) Serie .... Don Paco
- Señorita Medianoche (1963) Serie .... Don César
- Mañana puede ser verdad (episodio El hombre que perdió su risa (1962) series.
- Blum
- Teatro como en el Teatro
