= Gonzalo Morales (actor) =

Argentine actor

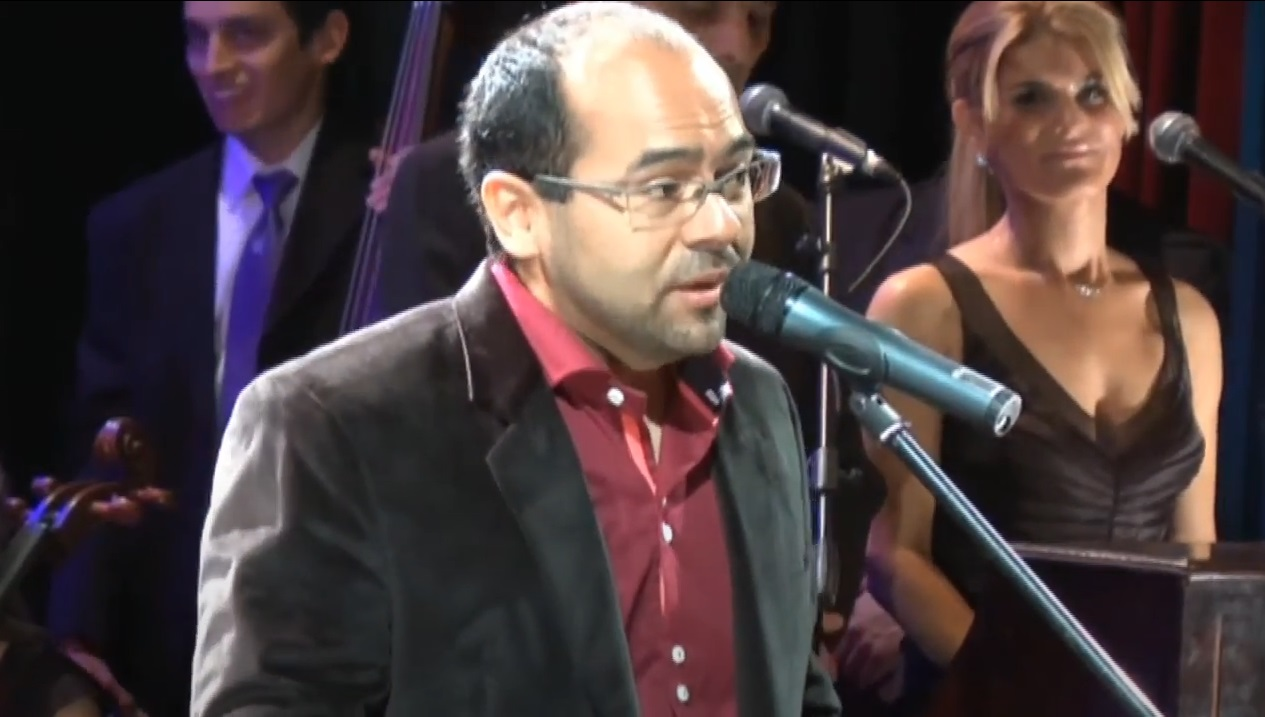
Image of Gonzalo Morales

Gonzalo Morales is an Argentine film and television actor.

== Filmography ==
- La Deuda interna (1988), aka Veronico Cruz
- La Última siembra (1991), aka The Last Harvest
- Cerca de la frontera (2000) aka Close to the Border
- Soleá, manchada en sombras (2005)

== Television ==
- "Padre Coraje" (2004)
- "Kachorra" (2002)
- "Primicias" (2000)
