= Nicolás Sarquís =

Argentine film director and screenwriter

Nicolás Sarquís (March 6, 1938 – April 19, 2003) was an Argentine film director and screenwriter. His first full-length film was Palo y hueso (1968), filmed in black and white. He died of lung cancer in 2003 in Buenos Aires, Argentina.

== Filmography ==
- 1965 Después de hora (short)
- 1968 Palo y hueso
- 1971 Talampaya (short)
- 1972 Navidad (short)
- 1974 La muerte de Sebastián Arache y su pobre entierro
- 1981 The Underground Man
- 1984 Zama
- 1989 Menem, retrato de un hombre (documentary)
- 1990 El fin de Heginio Gómez (short)
- 1995 Facundo, la sombra del tigre
- 1998 Sobre la tierra
