= List of Argentine films of 1933 =

The following films were produced in Argentina in 1933.

Argentine films of 1933
Title	Director	Release	Genre	Notes
A - Z
Los caballeros de cemento	Ricardo Hicken	1 June	Comedy	
Dancing	Luis José Moglia Barth	9 November	Musical	
El hijo de papá	John Alton	23 October	Comedy	
The House Is Serious	Lucien Jaquelux		Musical	Argentina, France co-production
El linyera	Enrique Larreta	12 September	Drama	
¡Tango!	Luis José Moglia Barth	27 April	Musical	
Los tres berretines	Enrique Telémaco Susini	19 May	Comedy	
