= Luis Sandrini =

Argentine actor (1905–1980)

- Sandrini photographed by Annemarie Heinrich, c. 1948
- Born: 22 February 1905; Buenos Aires, Argentina
- Died: 5 July 1980 (aged 75); Buenos Aires, Argentina
- Occupation: Actor
- Children: Sandra Sandrini

Luis Sandrini (22 February 1905 – 5 July 1980) was an Argentine comic film actor and film producer. He made over 80 appearances in film between 1933 and 1980.

== Early life ==
Sandrini in Los tres berretines (1933).

Sandrini was born in the Buenos Aires neighborhood of Caballito to Italian immigrants from Genoa. His father was a theatrical actor, and Luis began to work in a circus next to his parents, like clown. In the 1930s he entered the theatrical company of Enrique Muiño and Elías Isaac Alippi, where he met his first wife, the actress Chela Cordero. Made his debut in the cinema in 1933 acting in the first Argentine sound film Tango (directed by Luis Moglia Barth) in which he worked with a great of the theater of magazines like Pepe Arias and the stars of the tango Libertad Lamarque, Azucena Maizani, and Tita Merello, with the last one he had a romance when they filmed the film Juan Tenorio. He also appeared on the radio, where he made Felipe, who was the prototype of the Buenos Aires nice man, creation of Miguel Coronatto Paz, who was so successful that years later it was taken to television on Channel 13, where he shared the screen with the comedians Tato Bores, Alberto Olmedo, Pepe Biondi, José Marrone, Carlos Balá, Dringue Farías, and Juan Carlos Altavista.

In the theater he made Cuando los duendes cazan perdices, then taken to the movies, and, behind the scenes, was astonished by the beauty of the young actress Malvina Pastorino whom he married. This resounding success made him become the most representative figure of the golden age of Argentine cinema; which then became entrenched in the film that inaugurated the "hotel accommodation series of the sixties", which was Daniel Tinayre's La cigarra no es un bicho.

His last appearances were in costumbristas familiar films of Enrique Carreras. He died when he filmed the movie, My Family's Beautiful!, by Palito Ortega, where he worked alongside another great of the show, Niní Marshall.

== Awards ==
Among the prizes and recognitions that Sandrini obtained they count the Argentine Academy of Cinematography Arts and Sciences Award to the best actor in 1950 por The Fault the Other One Had, and a special mention in 1949 "for his brilliant performance in the Argentine cinema", the Silver Condor Award for Best Comedian in 1950 for Don Juan Tenorio and Juan Globo, the Silver Condor for Best Actor in 1954 for La Casa Grande and in 1972 for La Valija, and the 1981 Honour Konex Award, the latter posthumously.

== Filmography ==
- My Family's Beautiful! (1980)
- Frutilla (1980)
- Diablo metió la pata (1980)
- Vivir con alegría (1979)
- Casamiento de Laucha, El (1977)
- Such is Live (1977)
- Canto cuenta su historia, El (1976)
- Chicos crecen, Los (1976)
- Yo tengo fe (1974)
- Hoy le toca a mi mujer (1973)
- Professor Tirabombas, El (1972)
- Mi amigo Luis (1972)
- La Valija (1971)
- Pájaro loco (1971)
- Professor patagónico, El (1970)
- Un Elefante color ilusión (1970)
- Pimienta y pimentón (1970)
- El Profesor hippie (1969) .... Professor Héctor 'Tito' Montesano
- Kuma Ching (1969)
- En mi casa mando yo (1968) .... Esteban Rossi
- Cuando los hombres hablan de mujeres (1967) .... Alejandro
- ¡Al diablo con este cura! (1967) .... Padre Francisco Lambertini
- Pimienta (1966) .... Peregrino Ferrari
- Bicho raro (1965)
- Viaje de una noche de verano (1965)
- Mujeres los prefieren tontos, Las (1964)
- Cigarra no es un bicho, La (1964) .... Taxi Driver
- Castillo de los monstruos, El (1964) .... El Profesor
- Y el cuerpo sigue aguantando (1961)
- Chafalonías (1960)
- "Felipe" (1960) TV Series .... Felipe
- Mi esqueleto (1959)
- Hombre que hizo el milagro, El (1958)
- Fantoche (1957)
- Hombre virgen, El (1956)
- Barro humano, El (1955) .... Taxista
- Cuando los duendes cazan perdices (1955)
- Maldición gitana (1953)
- The Seducer of Granada (1953)
- Casa grande, La (1953)
- Payaso (1952)
- Me casé con una estrella (1951)
- Culpa la tuvo el otro, La (1950) .... Víctor Valdez/Sincerato Cuesta/Víctor Valdez's Mother
- Seductor, El (1950)
- Baño de Afrodita, El (1949)
- Embajador, El (1949) .... Palmiro Sosa
- Juan Globo (1949)
- Don Juan Tenorio (1949)
- ¡Olé torero! (1948) .... Manuel
- Yo soy tu padre (1948)
- The Thief (1947) .... Plácido López
- The Private Life of Mark Antony and Cleopatra (1947) .... Marco Antonio
- Diablo andaba en los choclos, El (1946)
- The Maharaja's Diamond (1946)
- The Dance of Fortune (1944)
- Dos rivales, Los (1944)
- Captain Poison (1943) .... Jorge de Córdoba
- Suerte llama tres veces, La (1943)
- Amor último modelo (1942)
- The House of the Millions (1942)
- Sensational Kidnapping (1942)
- Peluquería de señoras (1941)
- Más infeliz del pueblo, El (1941)
- Chingolo (1940)
- Bebé de contrabando, Un (1940)
- Palabra de honor (1939)
- Bartolo tenía una flauta (1939)
- Canillita y la dama, El (1938)
- Casa de Quirós, La (1937)
- Cañonero de Giles, El (1937)
- Melodías porteñas (1937)
- ¡Segundos afuera! (1937)
- Loco lindo (1936) .... Miguelito Andrade
- Don Quijote del altillo (1936) .... Eusebio
- Muchachada de a bordo, La (1936)
- Riachuelo (1934)
- Hijo de papá, El (1934)
- Los tres berretines (1933)
- ¡Tango! (1933) .... Berretín
