= List of foreign Ligue 1 players: K =

This is a list of foreign players in the French Ligue 1, which commenced play in 1932. The following players must meet both of the following two criteria:

1. Have played at least one Ligue 1 game. Players who were signed by Ligue 1 clubs, but only played in lower league, cup and/or European games, or did not play in any competitive games at all, are not included.
2. Are considered foreign, i.e., outside France and its dependencies (Guadeloupe, Martinique, Reunion Island or French Polynesia), determined by the following:

A player is considered foreign if he is not eligible to play for the national teams of France.

More specifically,

- If a player has been capped on international level, the national team is used; if he has been capped by more than one country, the highest level (or the most recent) team is used. These include French players with dual citizenship. Players who played for France but came as foreign players (such as Miguel Ángel Lauri) are also listed.
- If a player has not been capped on international level, his country of birth is used, except those who were born abroad from French parents or moved to France at a young age, and those who clearly indicated to have switched his nationality to another nation.

Clubs listed are those that the player has played at least one Ligue 1 game for.

Seasons listed are those that the player has played at least one Ligue 1 game in. Note that seasons, not calendar years, are used. For example, "1992–95" indicates that the player has played in every season from 1992–93 to 1994–95, but not necessarily every calendar year from 1992 to 1995.

In bold: players still active in Ligue 1 and their respective teams in current season.

== Kenya ==
- Joseph Okumu – Reims – 2023–25
- Dennis Oliech – Nantes, Auxerre, Ajaccio – 2005–11, 2013–15

== Kosovo ==
- Valon Berisha – Reims – 2020–22
- Bersant Celina – Dijon – 2020–21
- Elbasan Rashani – Clermont – 2021–24
- Arton Zekaj – Lille – 2018–19
- Arbër Zeneli – Reims – 2018–23
- Edon Zhegrova – Lille – 2021–25

== References and notes ==
=== Notes ===
1. Born in Germany
2. Born in Serbia (then part of the FR Yugoslavia)
3. Born in Sweden
4. Capped for the Norway national football team
5. Capped for the Norway national under-23 football team
6. Capped for the Norway national under-21 football team
7. Capped for the Norway national under-20 football team
8. Capped for the Norway national under-19 football team
9. Capped for the Norway national under-18 football team
10. Capped for the Norway national under-17 football team
11. Capped for the Norway national under-16 football team
12. Capped for the Norway national under-15 football team
13. Capped for the Serbia national under-17 football team
14. Capped for the Serbia national under-16 football team
15. Capped for the Serbia national under-15 football team
16. Capped for the Sweden national under-21 football team
17. Capped for the Sweden men's national under-19 football team
18. Capped for the Sweden men's national under-17 football team

=== Books ===
- Barreaud, Marc (1998). Dictionnaire des footballeurs étrangers du championnat professionnel français (1932-1997). L'Harmattan, Paris. ISBN 2-7384-6608-7.
- Tamás Dénes; Pál Peterdi; Zoltán Rochy; József Selmeci (1999). Kalandozó magyar labdarúgók. ISBN 963-85967-0-8.

=== Club pages ===
- AJ Auxerre former players
- AJ Auxerre former players
- Girondins de Bordeaux former players
- Girondins de Bordeaux former players
- Les ex-Tangos (joueurs), Stade Lavallois former players
- Olympique Lyonnais former players
- Olympique de Marseille former players
- FC Metz former players
- AS Monaco FC former players
- Ils ont porté les couleurs de la Paillade... Montpellier HSC Former players
- AS Nancy former players
- FC Nantes former players
- Paris SG former players
- Red Star Former players
- Red Star former players
- Stade de Reims former players
- Stade Rennais former players
- CO Roubaix-Tourcoing former players
- AS Saint-Étienne former players
- Sporting Toulon Var former players

=== Others ===
- stat2foot
- footballenfrance
- French Clubs' Players in European Cups 1955-1995, RSSSF
- Finnish players abroad, RSSSF
- Italian players abroad, RSSSF
- Romanians who played in foreign championships
- Swiss players in France, RSSSF
- EURO 2008 CONNECTIONS: FRANCE, Stephen Byrne Bristol Rovers official site
