= Gypsy Curse =

1953 film

- Directed by: Jerónimo Mihura
- Written by: Carlos Llopis (play); Jerónimo Mihura
- Starring: Luis Sandrini; Elena Espejo; Julia Caba Alba
- Cinematography: Antonio L. Ballesteros
- Edited by: Julio Peña Heredia
- Music by: Juan Quintero
- Production companies: Producciones Benito Perojo; Suevia Films
- Distributed by: Suevia Films
- Release date: 13 October 1953
- Running time: 75 minutes
- Country: Spain
- Language: Spanish

Gypsy Curse (Spanish: Maldición gitana) is a 1953 Spanish comedy film directed by Jerónimo Mihura and starring Luis Sandrini, Elena Espejo and Julia Caba Alba.

== Synopsis ==
Alejo Franchinelli is a widowed violinist whose mother-in-law, Doña Encarna, continually threatens him by sending him telegrams every month. Upon remarrying, his new mother-in-law makes his life miserable. One day the spirit of Doña Encarna appears to him, who assures him that she has died and, although she still has a dislike for him, she now wants to help him to get him to forgive her. Alejo confirms the death of his first mother-in-law and suddenly everything starts to go well for him, until he starts getting into trouble and asks Doña Encarna not to help him any more.

== Cast ==
- María Arias
- Josefina Bejarano
- Francisco Bernal
- Julia Caba Alba as Doña Alfonsa
- Gaspar de Aquino
- Carlos Díaz de Mendoza
- Elena Espejo as Elvira
- Félix Fernández
- Miguel Ángel Fernández
- Manuel Guitián
- Casimiro Hurtado
- Delia Luna
- Arturo Marín
- Juanjo Menéndez
- Elisa Méndez
- Juan Olaguivel
- Rosa Palomar
- Carmen Pérez Gallo
- Santiago Rivero
- Dora Sancho
- Eduardo Sandrini
- Luis Sandrini as Alejo Franchinelli
- Mercedes Serrano
- Ricardo Turia
- Aníbal Vela

== Bibliography ==
- de España, Rafael. Directory of Spanish and Portuguese film-makers and films. Greenwood Press, 1994.
