= Juan Carlos Mesa =

Argentine humorist, screenwriter and director

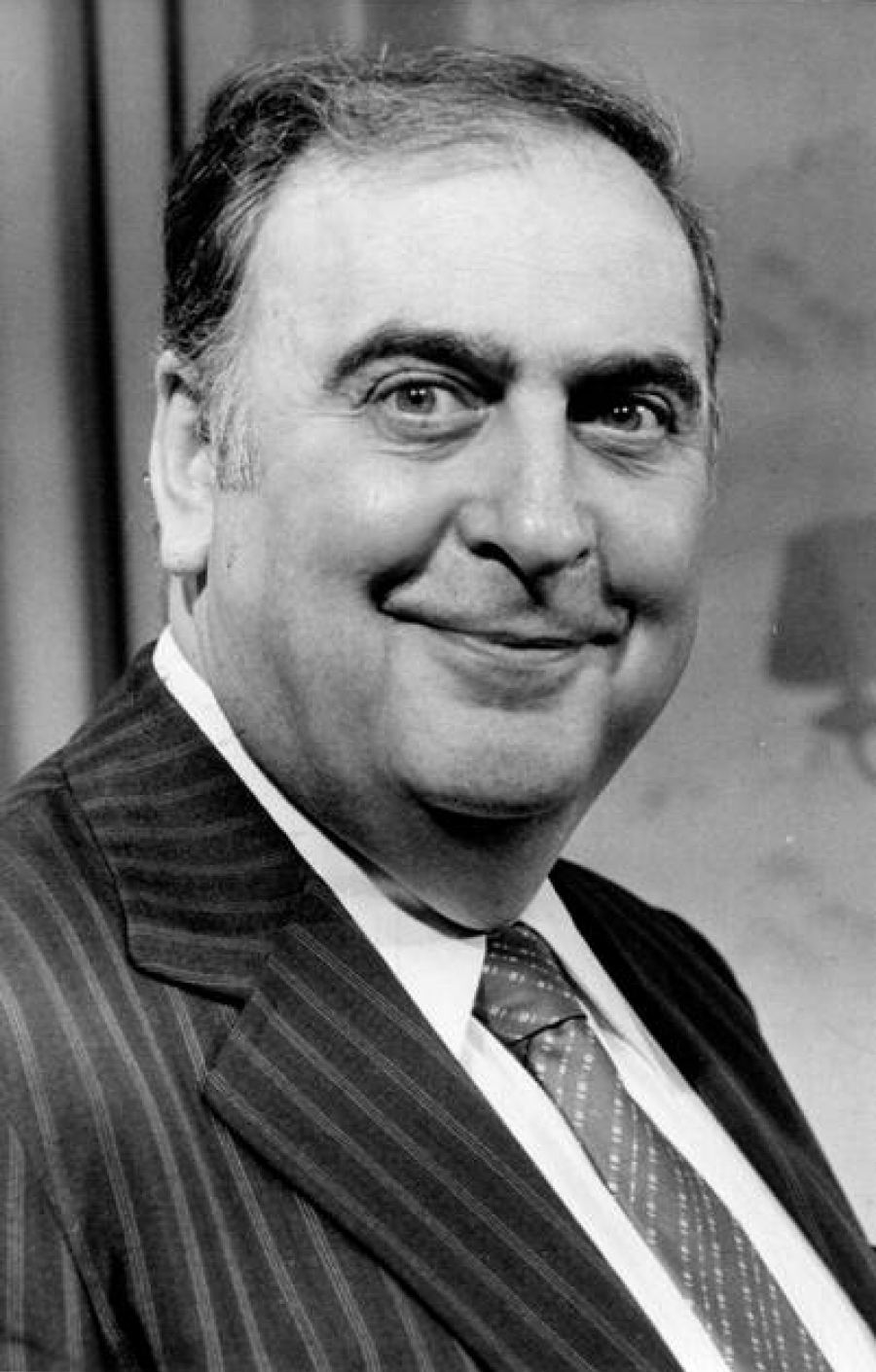
Juan Carlos Mesa.

Juan Carlos Mesa (May 15, 1930 – August 2, 2016) was an Argentine humorist, screenwriter, and director.

== Life and work ==
Juan Carlos Mesa was born in Córdoba, Argentina, in 1930. Following a stint as a writer in Uruguay for a sitcom, Telecataplum, He began his career in Argentine television in 1967 as a junior writer for comedian Carlos Balá and first collaborated on a film script in 1971, with Enrique Carreras' family comedy, El veraneo de los Campanelli. He was reunited with Carreras for the film's 1972 sequel, wrote later that year for Fernando Siro in his picaresque comedy, Autocine mon amour, and in 1976, earned his first credit as lead writer in Palito Ortega's Dos locos en el aire.

Writing for leading local television comic Tato Bores in 1980, Mesa first became widely known as a performer on the radio, rather than on the screen, with his popular Radio Mitre show, Tenis de mesa; the name of the show ("table tennis") was a play on his own last name, a witticism that became part of his act on many of his subsequent productions. Perhaps the most successful of these was Mesa de noticias ("News Desk"). The primetime sitcom, which premiered in 1983, set Mesa in a struggling network news program as its hapless programming director, and ran until 1987, appealing to audiences of an unusually varied demographic. His leading co-star, Italian actor Gianni Lunadei, joined Mesa in 1991 for a less successful spin-off, El gordo y el flaco (akin to Laurel and Hardy).

Mesa continued to write for cinema, as well, working with the best-known local comedy duo of the 1980s, Alberto Olmedo and Jorge Porcel (whose wiry and portly physiques, respectively, mirrored those of Lunadei and Mesa, somewhat). His script for the boot camp comedy Los colimbas se divierten (1986) was followed by the Olmedo-Porcel duo's last, the 1988 gender-bender Atracción peculiar.

Following Alberto Olmedo's death in 1988, and Porcel's departure for Miami Beach, Mesa's career declined somewhat. Appearing mainly on radio, he worked with his brother Edgardo and son, Juan Martín, in El Surtidor ("The Dispenser"), a variety show complete with astrology forecasts. He reemerged on television, however, as the chief writer and in a supporting role in a 2003 sitcom, Dr. Amor (played by Arturo Puig, who had become well known among younger audiences in the United States in the PBS educational series, Destinos). He returned Radio Mire in 2006 with a segment, Río con Mesa, on Lalo Mir's top-rated Animados, and portrayed Noah in a voice-over role for an award-winning 2007 animated film, El arca ("The Ark").

He died on 2 August 2016 at the age of 86.

=== Screenwriting (film) ===
- El veraneo de los Campanelli (1971)
- El picnic de los Campanelli (1972)
- Autocine mon amour (1972)
- Dos locos en el aire (1974)
- Brigada en acción (1977)
- El tío Disparate (1978)
- Sálvese quien pueda (1984)
- Mirame la palomita (1985)
- Los colimbas se divierten (1986)
- Rambito y Rambón primera misión (1986)
- Los colimbas al ataque (1987)
- Galería del terror (1987)
- Atracción peculiar (1988)
- El Arca (2007)
- Pájaros volando (2010)
