= Riachuelo (film) =

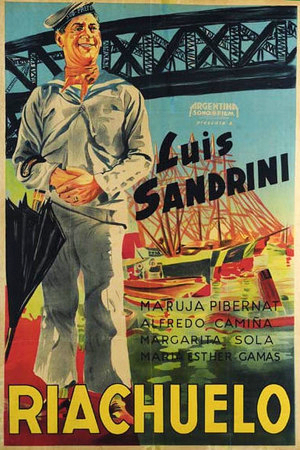
- Theatrical release poster
- Directed by: Luis Moglia Barth
- Written by: Luis Moglia Barth; José Bustamante y Ballivián
- Starring: Luis Sandrini; Maruja Pibernat; Alfredo Camiña; Margarita Solá; María Esther Gamas
- Cinematography: Francis Boeniger
- Music by: Edgardo Donato; Máximo Orsi
- Production company: Argentina Sono Film
- Release date: 4 July 1934 (Buenos Aires)
- Running time: 81 minutes
- Country: Argentina
- Language: Spanish

Riachuelo (English: Brook; a popular name for the Matanza River) is a 1934 Argentine comedy film directed by Luis Moglia Barth and starring Luis Sandrini as his popular character Berretín. The cast also included Maruja Pibernat, María Esther Gamas, Alfredo Camiña, Margarita Solá, Héctor Calcaño, Froilán Varela and Juan Sarcione. It was the third film produced by Argentina Sono Film, one of the first major film studios in the country, which had inaugurated the sound period and the Golden Age of Argentine cinema the previous year with the release of ¡Tango! The film premiered on 4 July 1934 at the Renacimiento theater in Buenos Aires.

The commercial success of the film allowed the economic viability of Argentina Sono Film, which had failed with its second production Dancing in 1933.

== See also ==
- List of Argentine films of 1934

== Bibliography ==
- Di Núbila, Domingo (1998). La época de oro. Historia del cine argentino I (in Spanish). Buenos Aires: Ediciones del Jilguero. ISBN 978-987-957-865-0.
