= Brigada en acción =

- Directed by: Palito Ortega
- Written by: Juan Carlos Mesa
- Starring: Palito Ortega
- Cinematography: Leonardo Rodríguez Solís
- Edited by: Jorge Gárate
- Music by: Palito Ortega
- Release date: 21 July 1977
- Running time: 90 minutes
- Country: Argentina
- Language: Spanish

Brigada en acción is a 1977 Argentine comedy film directed by and starring Palito Ortega and written by Juan Carlos Mesa. The film premiered in Argentina on 21 July 1977.

== Cast ==
- Palito Ortega
- Juan Carlos Altavista
- Christian Bach
- Carlos Balá
- Alberto Bello
- Marcelo Chimento
- Nora Cullen
- Alfredo Duarte
- Golde Flami
- Coco Fossati
- Alberto Martín
- Evangelina Massoni
- Daniel Miglioranza
- Ricardo Morán
- Blanca del Prado
- Andrés Redondo
- Raimundo Soto
