= List of Argentine films of 1934 =

A list of films produced in Argentina in 1934:

Argentine films of 1934
Title	Director	Release	Genre	Notes
A - Z
Ayer y hoy	Enrique Telémaco Susini	25 May	Musical drama	
Calles de Buenos Aires	José A. Ferreyra	16 March	Musical	
Downward Slope	Louis J. Gasnier	10 August	Musical	Argentina, United States co-production
En la tierra del Guarán	Lumiton	August	Documentary	
Galería de esperanzas	Carlos de la Púa	12 September	Drama	
Ídolos de la radio	Eduardo Morera	24 October	Comedy	
Mañana es domingo	José A. Ferreyra	8 November	Drama	
Riachuelo	Luis José Moglia Barth	4 July	Drama	
El Hombre Bestia	C.Z. Soprani		Horror	
