= Malvina Pastorino =

Argentine actress

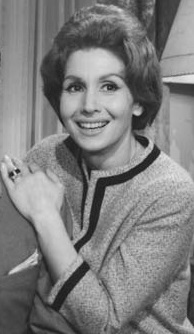
- Born: Malvina Pérez Pastorino; 16 November 1916; Buenos Aires, Argentina
- Died: May 6, 1994 (aged 77); Buenos Aires, Argentina
- Years active: 1949- 1988

Malvina Pastorino (November 16, 1916 in Buenos Aires, Argentina – May 6, 1994 in Buenos Aires, Argentina) was an Argentine film actress.

== Career ==
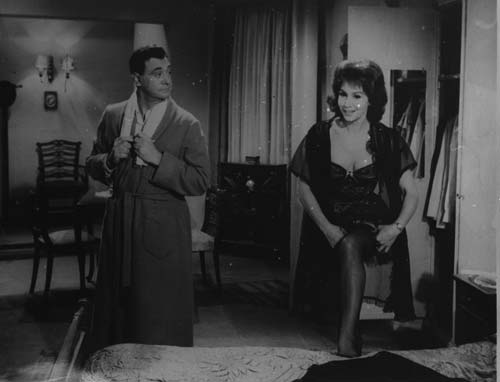
On-screen chemistry between Pastorino and the man who would become her husband 20 years later, Luis Sandrini in the film Chafalonías (1960).

She appeared in more than 20 film and television productions between 1949 and 1988. She was married to comedy actor Luis Sandrini from June 5, 1980 until her death in 1994, aged 77. She is the mother of actor and film maker Sandra Sandrini.

== Partial filmography ==
- The Seducer of Granada (1953)
- Asunto terminado (1953)
- Chafalonías (1960)
- The Dragonfly Is Not an Insect (1963)
- Los Neuróticos (1971)
- La Valija (1971)
- El Casamiento de Laucha (1977)
