= Maruja Pibernat =

Spanish film and radio actress

Maruja Pibernat (died 2004) was a film and radio actress.

== Biography ==
Maruja Pibernat was born in Spain and died in Buenos Aires on July 3, 2004. She was a film and radio actress, who began her career with sound films in the 1930s and finished in the 1980s cinema.

== Works ==
- Riachuelo by director Luis Moglia Barth in 1934.
- The Hour of Mary and the Bird of Gold by director Rodolfo Kuhn in 1975.
- Night of the Pencils by director Héctor Olivera in 1986.
- The Year of The Rabbit by director Fernando Ayala in 1987.
