= Beatriz Salomón =

Argentine actress (1953–2019)

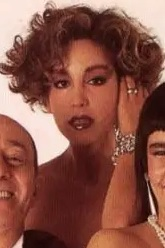
- Salomón in 1985
- Born: October 9, 1953; San Juan, Argentina
- Died: June 15, 2019 (aged 65); Buenos Aires
- Occupations: Actress, television host, vedette, singer
- Children: 2
- Website: http://www.agenciarte.com.ar/retro/beatriz-salomon/

Beatriz Salomón (October 9, 1953 – June 15, 2019) was an Argentine actress of Syrian origin, television presenter, vedette, and singer.

== Biography ==
Born to a Syrian background family, in 1971 she won the Miss San Juan contest, famous for having worked in several movies. She started off her career as an actress with the help of comedian and actor Alberto Olmedo.

Prior to working with Olmedo, she worked as advertising model.

She died from colon cancer in Buenos Aires on June 15, 2019.

== Selected filmography ==
- Blue Commandos in Action (1980)
- Chocolates and champagne (1984)
- Do not Touch Button (1985
- The Black can not (1986)
- The loons on the attack (1987)
- The manosanta is loaded (1987)
- Terror Gallery (1987)
- We were so poor (1988)
- Peculiar Attraction (1988)
- Shopping Center (1988)
- Mix (1988)
- Paradise Relax (House of massage) (1988)
- Punk Professor (1988)
- There is party in the tenement (1989)
- Porcel's kittens and mice (1989)
- Maximum force (1990)
- Jorge Corona and women (1990)
- Extermineitors II, revenge of the Dragon (1990)
- Enough for Me (1990)
- Beatriz Salomón en privado (1990)
- Corrupt Magazine (1991)
- Berugo love (1991)
- It rotted all (1992)
- Humor in the face (1992)
- Hard to peel (1992)
- Hilarious, hot magazine (1993)
- Corona President (1994)
- The last Argentine virgin (1995)
- The mood of Fashion Café (1999)
- Let us vote for the humor (2000)
- Beatriz's house (2000)
- I choose to be happy (2001)
- Fascinating Night (2003)
- The clone recharged with laughter (2004)
- Humor in custody (2005)
- Dancing for a Dream3 (2006)
- Movete Cristina, movete (2008)
- Humor and Glamour (2010)
