= Colonia Baranda =

Coordinates: 27°34′S 59°18′W

- Municipality and village
- Interactive map of Colonia Baranda
- Country: Argentina
- Province: Chaco Province
- Time zone: UTC−3 (ART)

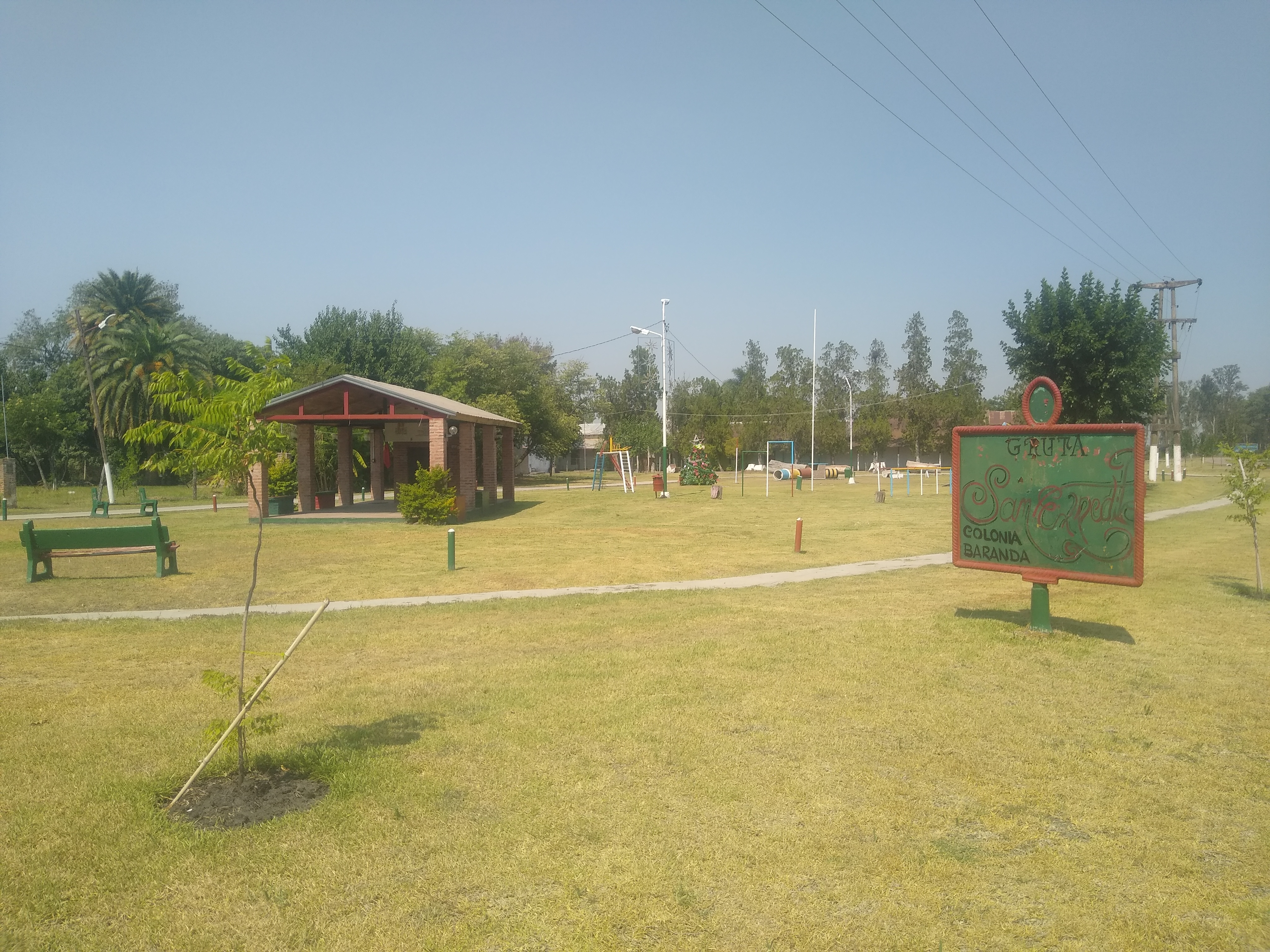
Main square of Colonia Baranda, at the entrance to the town.

Colonia Baranda is a village and municipality in Chaco Province in northern Argentina.

This town is notable as the birthplace of humorist Luis Landriscina.
