= Asunto terminado =

1953 film

- Directed by: Kurt Land
- Written by: Abel Santa Cruz
- Produced by: Kurt Land
- Starring: Juan Carlos Thorry; Malvina Pastorino
- Cinematography: Vicente Cosentino
- Edited by: José Cardella
- Music by: Víctor Slister
- Release date: 1953
- Running time: 85 minutes
- Country: Argentina
- Language: Spanish

Asunto terminado is a 1953 Argentine film of the classical era of Argentine cinema, directed by Kurt Land and written by Abel Santa Cruz. It is based on the play by André-Paul Antoine, "Métier de femme" and starred Juan Carlos Thorry and Malvina Pastorino. The movie was released on August 21, 1953.

== Cast ==
- Juan Carlos Thorry
- Malvina Pastorino
- Alfredo Almanza
- Julián Bourges
- Alejandro Maximino
- Toti Muñoz
- Toti Muñz
- Nelly Prince
- Beatriz Taibo
- Aída Villadeamigo
