= My Family's Beautiful! =

- Directed by: Palito Ortega
- Written by: José P. Dominiani
- Produced by: Palito Ortega
- Starring: Luis Sandrini; Niní Marshall
- Cinematography: Leonardo Rodríguez Solís
- Edited by: Jorge Gárate
- Music by: Palito Ortega
- Release date: 17 July 1980
- Running time: 103 minutes
- Country: Argentina
- Language: Spanish

My Family's Beautiful! (Spanish: ¡Qué linda es mi familia!) is a 1980 Argentine comedy film directed by Palito Ortega and starring Luis Sandrini and Niní Marshall. It was the final film of the comedian Marshall, who had made her screen debut in 1938.

== Summary ==
A young man works as a stunt double, but his true passion lies in singing. Within his work, subtle nods to the dictatorial government can be observed through the inclusion of aircraft carriers, sailors, and lyrics infused with a profound patriotic sentiment.

== Cast ==
- Luis Sandrini
- Niní Marshall as Rosita
- Palito Ortega
- Las Trillizas de Oro
- Mariana Karr
- Silvia Merlino
- Rolo Puente
- Héctor Armendáriz
- Angélica Perrone
- Rubén Green
- Vicente La Russa
- Alberto Irizar
- Rodolfo Onetto
- Sergio Malbrán
- Luis Corradi
- Ricardo Jordán
- Thelma Stefani
- Luis Tasca
- Diego Armando Maradona
- Juan Alberto Mateyko
- Alberto Martín
- Pablo Olivo
- Jorge Marchegiani
- Alfredo Monserrat
- Juan Carlos Altavista
- Carlos Balá
- Raúl Florido

== Bibliography ==
- Federico Finchelstein. The Ideological Origins of the Dirty War: Fascism, Populism, and Dictatorship in Twentieth Century Argentina. Oxford University Press, 2014.
