= Azucena Maizani =

Argentine singer and actress (1902–1970)

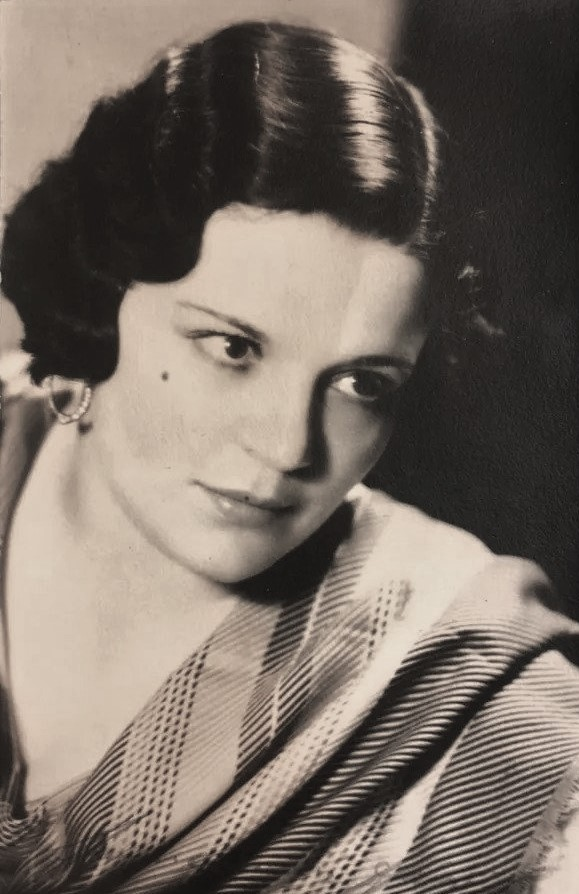

Background information
- Born: 17 November 1902; Buenos Aires, Argentina
- Died: 15 January 1970 (aged 67) Buenos Aires, Argentina
- Occupations: Singer, songwriter, actress

Azucena Maizani (17 November 1902 – 15 January 1970) was an Argentine tango singer, composer and actress. She was discovered in 1920 by Francisco Canaro and quickly emerged as a major star. Her frequent appearances on stage and radio made her the female counterpart of Carlos Gardel although she did not enjoy as successful a film career as he did, appearing in a handful of films of the Golden Age of Argentine cinema including ¡Tango! (1933) and Buenos Aires Sings (1947). During many years she gave performances dressed with men's suits or criollo cowboy attire for which she was known by the nickname "Funny-face Cowgirl", given to her by Libertad Lamarque in 1935.

== Early years ==
Maizani was born in Buenos Aires on 17 November 1902. She lived in the Palermo neighborhood until she was five in which, because it seemed that she had health problems and her parents were very poor, she was taken by some family members to live on Martín García island. On that island located in the middle of the Río de la Plata river, halfway between Argentina and Uruguay, she completed her grade school education and at 17, returned to Buenos Aires and began working as a seamstress in a shirt factory and in a fashion house. She liked singing and, according to Canaro, one night she went to Pigall where he acted and she convinced him to let her sing two tangos in public with his orchestra. If she did not get a job through this, it must have strengthened her in her artistic career, which began in 1922 in which she began as a chorus girl in the brothers César and Pepe Ratti's company which was putting on the piece, El bailarín del cabaret (The Cabaret Dancer) in the Apolo Theater, starring the singer Ignacio Corsini.

== Beginnings as a singer ==
At a family party that she went to with Delia Rodríguez, who at that moment was a well-known singer, she met Enrique Pedro Delfino accompanying everyone who wanted to sing on the piano. Maizani sang and left such an impression that the pianist introduced her to the theater business owner Pascual Carcavallo who in turn heard her and hired her. She debuted in the National Theater on July 27, 1923, with the comical sketch "A mí no me hablen de penas" (Don't tell me about your troubles) by Alberto Vacarezza. It did not have lyrics, she just sang the tango "Padre nuestro" (Our Father) composed especially for her by Delfino and Vacarezza. She was accompanied by the Salvador Merino orchestra and performed with such success that gave five repeated premiere public performances.

She continued in the theater and at the same time began to work in radio and record albums. One example of her success is that she was paid 200 pesos a month for her theater debut and she began to earn the same amount in radio but for each recording. In the summer she joined the brothers Leopoldo y Tomás Simari company in the Smart Theater with the piece "Ma-chi-fu" by César Bourell and in 1924 she worked on "Cristóbal Colón en la Facultad de Medicina" (Christopher Columbus in the Medical School) with Florencio Parravicini, famous for the ad-libs ("morcillas" (blood sausage) in theater jargon of the time) that he introduced and varied in each performance. That season, Maizani debuted pieces by José Bohr, "Pero hay una melena" and "Cascabel cascabelito", and began to record with the Francisco Canaro orchestra.

In 1925 she worked in the San Martín theater in the company headed by Héctor and Camila Quiroga, premiering two tangos that later became popular "Silbando" (Whistling) and "Organito de la tarde" (Little Organ in the Afternoon). She continued in 1926 at the same theater with Elías Alippi and at the Hipodrome theater located at Corrientes y Carlos Pellegrini Streets. During 1927 she acted in the Porteño theater, and some of her hits were her performances as "Pato" (Duck), "Amigazo" (Buddy) and "Esta noche me emborracho" (Tonight I'm Getting Drunk).

In 1928 she was hired by Radio Prieto, an important radio station in Buenos Aires. She spent that season at the Maipo Theater. The next year she gave performances in Montevideo y gave her first film performance in the silent film La modelo de la calle Florida (The Florida Street Model), directed by Julio Irigoyen.

== Tour through Spain and Portugal ==
Maizani had gone on many tours in Argentina and in 1931 in society with the violinist Roberto Zerrillo (her partner), she formed the "Compañía Argentina de Arte Menor" that included Anita Bobasso, with the artistic direction of Mario J. Bellini, traveled to Spain and debuted on September 11 at the Alcázar de Madrid Theater. The company gave performances in Alicante, Barcelona, Bilbao, Burgos, Santiago de Compostela, Teruel, Valladolid, Santander, San Sebastián, Huesca, Gijón, Zamora, Valencia, Palma de Mallorca and Zaragoza. On 14 April 1932, a tour began through Portugal that began in the María Victoria de Lisbon Theater and continued in Porto, Braga and Coímbra. They also performed in Biarritz (Francia), always with renewed success, and returned to Buenos Aires that same year.

== Return to Buenos Aires ==
Upon returning to her country, Maizani found that in her two-year absence, new female singers had emerged and, in many cases, were launched by frequent contests that were often organized by radio stations. They included: Libertad Lamarque, Ada Falcón, Adhelma Falcón, Tania, Mercedes Simone y Dorita Davis. She quickly recovered her popularity and acted in Tango (1933), the first Argentinian full-length film with sound. Maizani did not sing directly but her voice was heard singing La canción de Buenos Aires while the credits played along with an image of her face. Later on, she has a scene in which she sang Milonga sentimental while dressed in a man's suit.

In 1935 she appeared in a cabaret in the movie Monte criollo singing the tango of the same name with lyrics by Homero Manzi and the music of Francisco Pracánico. It was a loose police role directed by Arturo S. Mom and interpreted by Nedda Francy and Francisco Petrone.

In 1937, she went on an extensive tour in America that included Mexico and New York. In New York, she did radio acting, recorded albums and played a minor role in the film Di que me quieres, a film directed by William Rowland, that included the performance of a select group of ballerinas and typical Latin-American singers. Azucena also appeared in the 1940 film Nativa, in which she sings and explores an acting role without much development or transcendence.

In the 1940s she appeared less in the public sphere. She did, however, make some recordings, help fundraise for the victims of the earthquake of 1944 in San Juan by offering concerts, acted on Radio Argentina, and toured through the interior of Chile, Peru, Ecuador and Colombia, although she was no longer as famous as she used to be. Together with Ivo Pelay, she acted in the famous Uruguayan theater 18 de julio in Montevideo, and in the El Nacional theater in Buenos Aires. Azucena acted in cafes and went to Brazil in 1961 to record. In November 1962 by the initiative of Dorita Davis, a festival was made in her celebration at the Astral Theater, in which she sang in front of a crowd that welcomed and applauded her enthusiastically. In the next couple of years she continued to sing even up until her lonesome death on 15 January 1970, after she suffered a hemiplegia.

== Personal life ==
In 1928, Azucena Maizani married Juan Scarpino, but the couple separated shortly after the death of their only son. The following year, she teamed up with violinist Roberto Zerrillo, with whom she went on tour inside of the country, and later throughout Europe. Later, Azucena had a relationship with Rodolfo José María Caffaro, who began his career as a singer under the pseudonym Ricardo Colombres, but it was later discovered that he cheated on her, and in 1936 he committed suicide.

== Compositions ==
Azucena did not have an extensive amount of work with regard to composing; her first was Volvé Negro in 1924. Her most famous work was Pero yo sé in 1928- it became famous and successful, and it was recorded by numerous artists, highlighting Ángel Vargas' version from Ángel D'Agostino's orchestra. She also composed, in collaboration with Oreste Cúfaro and Manuel Romero the tango La canción de Buenos Aires, which was recorded by Carlos Gardel, a friend.

Other works include the waltz Pensando en ti with verses by Celedonio Flores; Decí que sí, a famous ranchera that she did with Cúfaro and Alberto Pidemunt; the milongas Adonde están los varones; Por qué se fue?; Dejáme entrar, hermano; En esta soledad, the ranchera Remigio; Lejos de mi tierra, among others.

== Recording ==
From 1923 to 1926, Azucena recorded with the Francisco Canaro orchestra, and later with Enrique Pedro Delfino at the piano and Manual Parada on the guitar, in both cases for the company Orión. From 1929 to 1931, she recorded for the label Brunswick, accompanied by the violinist Roberto Zerrillo, the pianist Oreste Cúfaro and Manual Parada, with the violinist Antonio Rodio making sporadic appearances. Azucena Maizani first recorded the tango Malena by Homero Manzi and Lucio Demare, and she also recorded Ninguna (lyrics by Homero Manzi and music by Raúl Fernández Siro) in 1942. In total, Azucena recorded over 270 works.

== Discography ==
Apología Tangeura. Barcelona, Altaya, T.A. 026, 1998, compact disc.

Azucena Maizani 1924-1939, Disco Latina DL-122, 1984, 33 1/3 rpm.

Azucena Maizani, 1926-1935, vol 2, Disco Latina DL-142, 1986, 33 1/3 rpm.

Azucena Maizani: la ñata gaucha. Azucena Maizani singing with accompaniment. Recorded in Buenos Aires, 1928–1935. Barcelona: El bandoneón, EBCD-27, 1991, compact disc.

Se Va la Vida: 1923-1945. Harlequin; Bexhill-On-Sea, England: Product of Interstate Music, HQ CD 54,1995, compact disc.

Tango Ladies. Harlequin; Bexhill-On-Sea, England: Product of Interstate Music, HQ CD 34, 1994, compact disc.

== Selected filmography ==
- ¡Tango! (1933)
- Buenos Aires Sings (1947)

== Bibliography ==
- Karush, Matthew B. Culture of Class: Radio and Cinema in the Making of a Divided Argentina, 1920–1946. Duke University Press, 2012.
