= Marcelo Chimento =

Argentine actor (born 1964)

- Born: 12 June 1964 (age 61); Santa Fe, Argentina

Marcelo Chimento (born 1964) is an Argentine actor who made several appearances in film and television in Argentina in the 1970s and early 1980s.

In 1971 he appeared in the musical Balada para un mochilero directed by Carlos Rinaldi which starred Jose Marrone.

In 1975, he participated in the García Ferré's animated film "Petete y Trapito", providing the voice of Trapito, a little scarecrow. In 1977 he starred in the film Brigada en acción.

He gave up professional acting at the age of 26 following some work discrepancies with the management of a TV station. He has since taught drama privately. Also, he later became more interested in music playing percussion in a band called "Verdugo Destino" and later in Memys el Fandi.

== Filmography ==
- "Entre el amor y el poder" (1984) TV Series .... Roberto
- "Andrea Celeste" (1980) TV Series .... Bonzo
- Locuras del profesor, Las (1979)
- Brigada en acción (1977)
- Petete y Trapito (1975)
- "Cacho de la esquina" (1973) TV Series .... Luisito
- "Lo mejor de nuestra vida... nuestros hijos" (1973) TV Series
- Balada para un mochilero (1971)
- Estación Retiro (1971) TV Series .... Sebita
