= Peculiar Attraction =

- VHS release poster by Gativideo
- Spanish: Atracción peculiar
- Directed by: Enrique Carreras
- Written by: Juan Carlos Mesa
- Starring: Alberto Olmedo; Jorge Porcel; Silvia Pérez; Tincho Zabala; Beatriz Taibo; Beatriz Salomón
- Cinematography: Victor Hugo Caula
- Edited by: Eduardo López; Miguel López
- Music by: Mike Rivas
- Distributed by: Aries Cinematográfica Argentina
- Release date: March 3, 1988 (Argentina)
- Running time: 90 minutes
- Country: Argentina
- Language: Spanish

Peculiar Attraction (Spanish: Atracción peculiar) is a 1988 Argentine comedy film directed by Enrique Carreras, written by Juan Carlos Mesa, and starring Alberto Olmedo and Jorge Porcel. Shot during the Summer of 1987/88 in Mar del Plata, it was the last feature film appearance in Alberto Olmedo's career. It was released on March 3, 1988, two days before Olmedo's death in Mar del Plata.

== Synopsis ==
Reporter Jorge Trolombatti (Porcel) is employed by a magazine named Tevelunga. The magazine's editorial director proposes writing an article about the recent influx of transvestites during Argentina's Summer season (from December to March) in Mar del Plata. In order to accomplish this, he recruits Alberto (Olmedo), a flamboyant gay photographer. The plan is for the two of them to blend in with the beach scene discreetly while creating the most captivating article of the season. Although Jorge initially wants no part in this scheme, he is eventually coerced by his boss and reluctantly agrees. Unbeknownst to Jorge and Alberto, two other colleagues from the same magazine are sent to keep an eye on their work. Upon arriving in Mar del Plata, a city known as the "Ciudad Feliz/La Feliz" (Happy City) the story takes a humorous turn as unexpected and comical mishaps begin to unfold amidst the bustling summer season. As they delve deeper into the transvestite scene, Jorge and Alberto start to sense something peculiar, gradually building up to an action-packed and laughter-filled climax.

== Cast ==
- Alberto Olmedo as Alberto
- Jorge Porcel as Jorge
- Pablo Codevila
- Judith Gabbani
- Adolfo García Grau
- Rodolfo Machado
- Adrián Martel
- Edgardo Mesa
- Fernando Olmedo
- Silvia Pérez
- Ignacio Quirós
- Ana María Ricci
- Beatriz Salomón
- Sergio Velazco Ferrero
- Tincho Zabala
