= Buenos Aires Sings =

1947 films

- Directed by: Antonio Solano
- Written by: Santos Rodolfo Stella
- Starring: Niní Marshall; Hugo del Carril; Azucena Maizani; Homero Cárpena
- Production company: Sucesos Argentinos
- Release date: 3 June 1947
- Running time: 55 minute
- Country: Argentina
- Language: Spanish

Buenos Aires Sings (Spanish: Buenos Aires canta) is a 1947 Argentine musical film of the classical era of Argentine cinema, directed by Antonio Solano and starring Niní Marshall, Hugo del Carril and Azucena Maizani. The film is part of the tradition of tango films.

== Cast ==
- Niní Marshall
- Hugo del Carril
- Azucena Maizani
- Homero Cárpena
- Oscar Alemán
- Oscar Alonso
- Los Lecuona Cuban Boys
- Lilia Bedrune
- Los Mills Brothers
- Chola Luna
- Ernesto Famá
- Francisco Amor

== Bibliography ==
- Etchelet, Raúl. Niní Marshall: (la biografía). La Crujía Ediciones, 2005.
