= Luis Landriscina =

Argentine humorist and actor

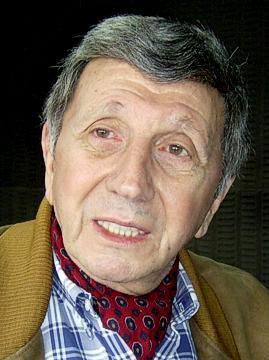
Luis Landriscina in 2007.

Luigi Landriscina, better known for his stage name Luis Landriscina (born 19 December 1935 in Colonia Baranda, Chaco Province, Argentina) is an Argentine humorist and actor.

He is famous for his humorous stories full of folklore and popular culture. He also made famous the character of "Don Verídico", authored by the Uruguayan Julio César Castro "Juceca".

== Discography ==
- ???? - Mateando con Landriscina - PHILIPS
- ???? - Landriscina por Landriscina - PHILIPS
- ???? - El humor de mi país - PHILIPS
- 1973 - Contata Criolla (Opas 22 y Yo 23) - PHILIPS
- 1974 - Landriscina actúa para usted - PHILIPS
- 1974 - Regular, pero sincero - PHILIPS
- 1974 - Contata Criolla - Concierto para sonreír (Segundo movimiento) - PHILIPS
- 1975 - Del Chaco a América del Norte - PHILIPS
- 1975 - Contata Criolla - Concierto con gente y todo (Tercer movimiento) - PHILIPS
- 1976 - Contata Criolla - Concierto en Solo de Mate Amargo (Quinto movimiento) - PHILIPS
- 1976 - Contata de dos orillas - PHILIPS
- 1978 - Fiesta Argentina - Los Campeones (Junto a Gigo Arangio) - PHILIPS
- 1978 - Contata para las Fiestas - PHILIPS
- 1979 - De entrecasa (Junto a Los 4 de Córdoba) - PHILIPS
- 1981 - Mano a mano con el país - Philips
- 1982 - Mano a mano con el país Vol. 2 - PHILIPS
- 1982 - A reírse de lo lindo con Luis Landriscina - MERCURIO
- 1983 - Mano a mano con el país Vol. 3
- 1984 - Mano a mano con el país Vol. 4
- 1985 - Mano a mano con el país Vol. 5
- 1986 - Landriscina en los festivales
- 1987 - Aquí me pongo a contar - POLYGRAM DISCOS S.A.
- 1987 - Lo que sobra no se tira - PHILIPS
- 1989 - Poesías - PHILIPS
- 1989 - Bodas de plata con el humor - PHILIPS
- 1990 - Es mundial - POLYGRAM DISCOS S.A.
- 1993 - El candidato para sonreír
- 1992 - Contador Público Nacional
- 1994 - 30 años de sonrisas - POLYGRAM DISCOS S.A.
- 1995 - Venga, y le cuento - POLYGRAM DISCOS S.A.
- 1996 - Campeón del humor - POLYGRAM DISCOS S.A.
- 1997 - Luis Landriscina - Antonio Tarragó Ros CD Nro. 1 - EDITORIAL ATLÁNTIDA S.A.
- 1999 - Contando cuentos - UNIVERSAL
- 1999 - Luis Landriscina Cuenta la Ley Federal de Educación - MINISTERIO DE CULTURA Y EDUCACIÓN DE LA NACIÓN
- 2000 - Muchos kilómetros de humor - UNIVERSAL
- 2003 - El chiste no es cuento - POL
- 2008 - Colour Collection - UNIVERSAL

== Filmography ==
- Joven, viuda y estanciera (1970)
- El casamiento de Laucha (1977)
- Millonarios a la fuerza (1979)

== Bibliography ==
- Con gusto a Chaco (in Spanish). Santa Fe, Argentina: Tall. Gráf. de la Editorial Belgrano. 1967. OCLC 12340552.
- Mis versos (in Spanish). Rosario: Molachino Establecimiento Gráfico. 1972. OCLC 5899156.
- Aquí me pongo a contar : los mejores cuentos de Luis Landriscina (1. ed.). [Buenos Aires]: Imaginador. 1995–1996. ISBN 950-768-056-X. OCLC 36485641.
- Don Luis Landriscina y su querida Argentina : [el humor de cada provincia a través de sus cuentos] (1. ed.). [Argentina]: Imaginador. 2001. ISBN 950-768-347-X. OCLC 61395744.
- De todo como en galpón. Tarragó Ros, Antonio, 1947- (2a. ed.). Buenos Aires: Imaginador. 2006. ISBN 950-768-576-6. OCLC 143239014.
- Humor y la cocina (in Spanish). Imaginador. 2014. ISBN 978-9507686917.
