= Chafalonías =

1960 film

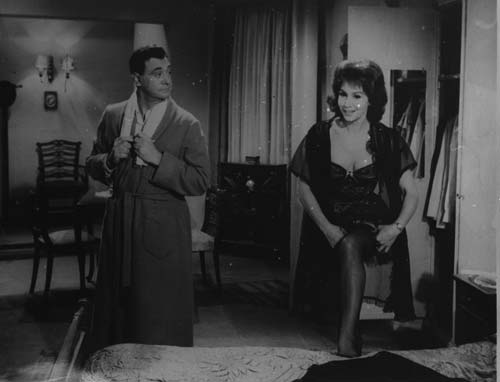
- Luis Sandrini and Malvina Pastorino
- Directed by: Mario Soffici
- Written by: Hugo Moser
- Release date: 17 November 1960
- Running time: 85 minute
- Country: Argentina
- Language: Spanish

Chafalonías is a 1960 Argentine comedy film directed by Mario Soffici and starring Luis Sandrini. It is based on a short story by Guy de Maupassant.

== Cast ==
- Alberto Bello
- Amalia Bernabé
- Mary Capdevila
- Eduardo de Labar
- Maruja Lopetegui
- Nora Massi
- Inés Moreno
- Malvina Pastorino
- Antonio Provitilo
- Eduardo Sandrini
- Luis Sandrini
- Osvaldo Terranova
- Aída Villadeamigo
