= The Seducer of Granada =

- Directed by: Lucas Demare
- Written by: Lucas Demare; Sixto Pondal Ríos; José Santugini
- Starring: Luis Sandrini; Malvina Pastorino
- Cinematography: Antonio L. Ballesteros
- Edited by: Antonio Ramírez de Loaysa
- Music by: Juan Quintero
- Production companies: Producciones Benito Perojo; Suevia Films
- Distributed by: Suevia Films
- Release date: 1 September 1953
- Running time: 90 minutes
- Countries: Argentina; Spain
- Language: Spanish

The Seducer of Granada (Spanish: El seductor de Granada) is a 1953 Argentine Spanish comedy film directed by Lucas Demare and starring Luis Sandrini and Malvina Pastorino.

== Cast ==
- Valeriano Andrés
- Inocencio Barbán
- Carlos Blanquet
- Juan Cazalilla
- Félix Dafauce
- Fernando Fernández de Córdoba
- Casimiro Hurtado
- Concha López Silva
- Arturo Marín
- José Moratalla
- Eloísa Muro
- Guillermo Méndez
- Malvina Pastorino
- Carmen Pérez Gallo
- Rubén Rojo
- Luis Sandrini

== Bibliography ==
- Alberto Elena. El cine del tercer mundo: diccionario de realizadores. Turfan, 1993.
