= El Casamiento de Laucha =

- Directed by: Enrique Dawi
- Release date: 1977
- Running time: 102 minute
- Country: Argentina
- Language: Spanish

El Casamiento de Laucha (translated as Laucha's marriage) is a 1977 Argentine film directed by Enrique Dawi.

== Cast ==
- Marta Albertini
- Max Berliner
- Amalia Bernabé
- Pablo Cumo Jr.
- Ulises Dumont
- Coco Fossati
- Alberto Irizar
- Luis Landriscina
- Noemí Laserre
- Malvina Pastorino
- Pedro Quartucci
- Romualdo Quiroga
- Luis Sandrini
- Mario Sapag
- Osvaldo Terranova
