= La Hora de María y el pájaro de oro =

1975 film by Rodolfo Kuhn

- Directed by: Rodolfo Kuhn
- Release date: 1975
- Running time: 105 minute
- Country: Argentina
- Language: Spanish

La Hora de María y el pájaro de oro is a 1975 Argentine film.

It received its premiere on August 28, 1975. It was filmed in Eastmancolor in the cities of Corrientes, Empedrado, Goya and Mercedes. It was directed by Rodolfo Kuhn, with a script by Eduardo Gudiño Kieffer. It is about a young peasant woman and her son who is a prisoner of the golden bird.

== Cast ==
- Leonor Manso
- Dora Baret
- Arturo Puig
- Jorge Rivera López
- Martín Deiros
- Marta Albertini
- Milagros de la Vega
- Sara Bonet
- Inés Ruiz
- Maruja Pibernat
- Nolo Arias
- Ramón Machuca
- Gregoria Miño
- Claudio Casas
- Chelda Arrieu
- Marta Arrieu
