= Los tres berretines =

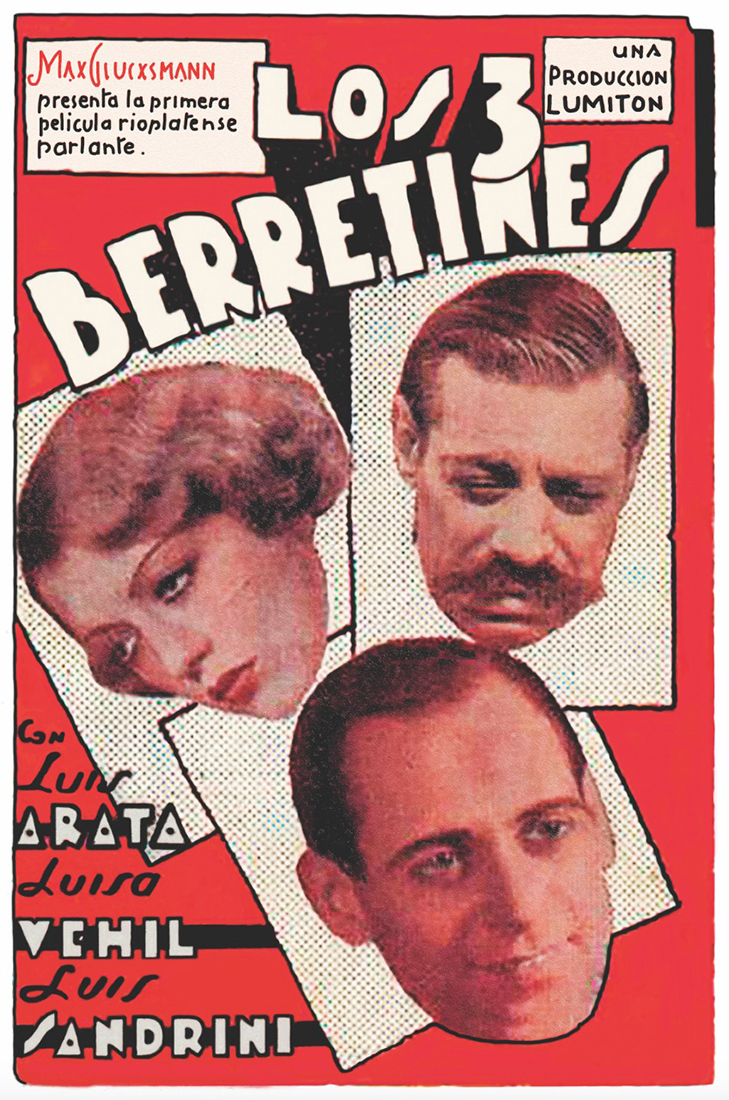
- Theatrical release poster
- Directed by: John Alton, José Guerrico, László Kish, Luis Romero Carranza, Enrique Telémaco Susini
- Written by: Nicolás de las Llanderas, Arnaldo Malfatti
- Produced by: Raúl Orzábal Quintana
- Starring: Luis Arata, Luis Sandrini, Luisa Vehil
- Cinematography: John Alton
- Edited by: Francisco Múgica
- Music by: Enrique Delfino "Delfy"
- Production company: Lumiton
- Release date: 19 May 1933 (Buenos Aires)
- Running time: 65 minutes
- Country: Argentina
- Language: Spanish

Los tres berretines (The Three Whims) is a 1933 Argentine black and white comedy film, the first film made by the newly formed Lumiton film studio, and one of the first sound films made in Argentina. Along with ¡Tango!, released that same year, the film is credited with inaugurating the Golden Age of Argentine cinema. It was a great success and launched the film career of the comedian Luis Sandrini. In 2022, the film was included in Spanish magazine Fotogramas's list of the 20 best Argentine films of all time.

== Synopsis ==
The film has traditional popular melodrama plot elements, and includes performances of tango songs. It depicts a family whose members are obsessed with the three national berretines (interests or hobbies) of tango, football and cinema. (In the play the last berretín was radio.). The family is middle class and makes its living from a hardware store. The father complains that the hobbies lead the family to neglect business. In the end, the father himself succumbs to all three hobbies.

It is one of the first Argentine films dealing with the themes of immigration (to Argentina).

== Cast ==
The full cast was:

- Luis Arata
- Luis Sandrini
- Luisa Vehil
- Florindo Ferrario
- Benita Puértolas
- Héctor Quintanilla
- Malena Bravo
- Dolores Dardes
- Miguel Ángel Lauri
- Luis Díaz
- Dora del Grande
- Mario Danesi
- Homero Cárpena
- Mario Mario
- Trío Foccile
- Marafiotti
- Aníbal Troilo
- Miguel Leme
- Osvaldo Fresedo
- Leonor Rinaldi (uncredited)

== Production ==
Los tres berretines was directed by Enrique Telémaco Susini and starring the local actors Luis Sandrini and Luisa Vehil. The American cinematographer John Alton was not credited but may have played an important role in direction and cinematography. Los tres berretines was based on a hit play of the same name, in which the circus performer and actor Luis Sandrini played Eusebio, a brother with a dream of becoming a famous tango composer. Lumiton expanded his role in the film version. Los tres berretines was released on 19 May 1933 in the Ástor in Buenos Aires. It was the second Argentine film with an optical soundtrack. The first was ¡Tango!, released the week before.

== Reception ==
The film, which cost 18,000 pesos to produce, earned over one million. Sandrini's performance made him the first local cinema star.
