= Mercedes Simone =

Argentine actress and tango singer

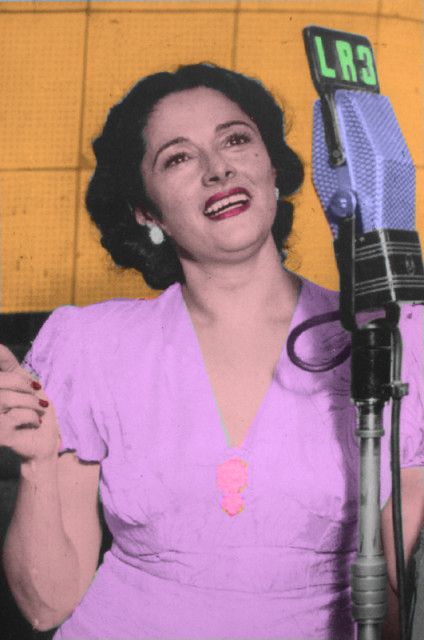
- Mercedes Simone in the 1930s

Background information
- Born: María Mercedes Simone; April 21, 1904; Villa Elisa, Buenos Aires Province, Argentina
- Died: October 2, 1990 (aged 86) Buenos Aires, Argentina
- Occupations: Singer, songwriter
- Years active: 1926–1950s
- Spouse: Pablo Rodríguez

Mercedes Simone (April 21, 1904, Villa Elisa, Buenos Aires – October 2, 1990) was an Argentine singer and actress, known as "La Dama del Tango" ("The Lady of Tango").

== Life ==
Mercedes Simone was born in Villa Elisa, Buenos Aires Province from José Simone and Matilde Suárez. When Mercedes was 10 months the family moved to La Plata.

In La Plata she worked at the printing house Benavídez-Charlone. In 1923, she met the guitarist Pablo Rodríguez, who would become her husband that same year.

The couple moved to Villa Elisa, where Rodríguez opened a hair salon. Around that time Mercedes acquired a bandoneon and started taking lessons with maestro Domingo Bozzarelli.

=== Professional career ===
In 1926 Mercedes debuted as a singer, accompanying the duo made up of her husband, Rodríguez y Longo, on a tour through Bahía Blanca. They continued touring in Mar del Plata, Tres Arroyos, Tandil, Azul, Olavarría, Ensenada and La Plata.

In Buenos Aires she made her solo debut on 12 October 1926, at the café El Nacional. Once established as an artist, she performed at the Empire theater (a venue reserved for the top stars of the time), and at the Follies Bergère, where one night she was heard by Carlos Gardel.

She worked from 1932 to 1936 at Radio Splendid, Radio El Mundo and Radio Argentina.

=== Last years ===
In 1966, she opened a tango venue named Cantando, which remained in operation for two years. She regularly performed there, accompanied by maestro Lucio Demare. She also made appearances on Argentine television, notably participating in the program Sábados Circulares.

On June 17, 1969, the Academia Porteña del Lunfardo held a public session in her honor.

She dies in Buenos Aires on 2 October 1990.

== Songs ==
- La marcha nupcial - 1932
- Milonga sentimental - 1932
- La última cita - 1933
- Mía - 1933
- Cuatro palabras - 1933
- Esquinas porteñas - 1934
- Esta noche me disfrazo - 1934
- Será una noche – 1936
- Náufrago – 1936
- Milonga triste – 1937
- Abandono – 1938
- Caricias – 1938
- Carnaval de mi barrio – 1938
- Vieja amiga – 1938
- Media vida – 1938
- Claudinette – 1942
- Barrio de tango – 1943
- Garúa – 1943
- Verdemar – 1944
- Motivo sentimental – 1944
- Otra noche – 1944
- Cada día te extraño más – 1944

== Filmography ==
- ¡Tango! (1933)
- Sombras porteñas (1936)
- La vuelta de Rocha (1937)
- Ambición (1939)
- La otra y yo (1949)
