= Miguel Ángel Fernández =

Miguel Ángel Fernández may refer to:

- Miguel Ángel Fernández (cyclist) (born 1997), Spanish cyclist
- Miguel Ángel Fernández Ordóñez (born 1945), Spanish economist and politician
- Miguel Ángel Fernández-Palacios (born 1965), Spanish politician and diplomat
- Miguel Ángel Fernández Sanjuán, Spanish theoretical physicist
