= Dos locos en el aire =

- Release date: 1976
- Running time: 94 minute
- Country: Argentina
- Language: Spanish

Dos locos en el aire is a 1976 Argentine film, directed by Palito Ortega.

== Cast ==
Alphabetically, by last name:

- Carlos Balá
- Alberto Bello
- Roberto Carnaghi
- Coco Fossati
- Raúl Fraire
- Katunga
- Ángel Magaña
- Palito Ortega
- Evangelina Salazar
- Julia Sandoval
