= Enrique Telémaco Susini =

Argentine film director and media pioneer

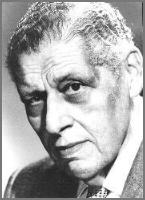
Portrait of Enrique Telémaco Susini by photographer Annemarie Heinrich

Enrique Telémaco Susini (January 31, 1891 – July 4, 1972) was an Argentine entrepreneur and media pioneer.

In 1920, Susini led the effort for the first radio broadcast in Argentina, and subsequently established one of the earliest regular radio stations in the world. During the 1920s and 1930s, he became a successful entrepreneur in the nascent radio and film industry.

Besides his business interests, Susini was an accomplished artist. He worked as director for theaters in Argentina and Italy and directed several movies produced by Lumiton, which he owned.

== Early life ==
Enrique T. Susini was born in Buenos Aires as son of Dr. Telémaco Susini, professor of pathological anatomy at the University of Buenos Aires and the country's first otolaryngologist. In 1906, his father assumed the position of Argentine consul in the Austro-Hungarian capital of Vienna. This allowed young Susini, who had received his high-school diploma one year earlier at the age of 14 to attend the Vienna conservatory, where he received formal training in singing and playing the violin. After briefly studying physics and chemistry in Berlin and Paris, he returned to Buenos Aires in 1909 to begin his medical studies at the faculty where his father had taught. In 1913, at the age of 22, he received his degree of medical doctor having written an award-winning thesis.

After his graduation, he briefly worked as a journalist, helping to found the Asociación de la Crítica (Association of [theater] critics) in 1915. One year later, he joined the Argentine military, where he conducted research about the influence of electric and acoustic stimuli on the human body and set up a laboratory for veterinary vaccines.

== Radio Days ==
=== Radio Pioneer ===
In 1910, Guglielmo Marconi, winner of the previous year's Nobel Prize in Physics, had come to Argentina for the centennial festivities of the country's independence. During his stay, he used the opportunity to set up a telegraphic radio station in Bernal, from where he successfully transmitted messages to Canada and Ireland. The publicity generated by Marconi's visit helped to create a group of mostly young radio enthusiasts. Among these young people were Susini and a group of his friends from medical school.

In 1915, the community had become large and sophisticated enough for a newspaper article to mention that the radio amateurs "formed a sort of fraternity, exchanging news, talking with each other over long distances, and even transmitting little piano or violin concerts over their connections."

Susini, along with his nephew Miguel Mugica and his friends Cesar Guerrico and Luis Romero Carranza formed part of this community and took part in these first tentative steps. Soon they acquired the nickname Locos de la Azotea ("the crazy people from the roof"), because their hobby involved activities - sometimes bordering on the acrobatic - on top of tall buildings, where they mounted the long wire antennas required by early-type radios. During this time, the group first played with the idea to use radio as a means for cultural dissemination, a fact that Susini himself later ascribed to their shared passion for theater and music.

At the outbreak of the World War in Europe, radio communication had become a technology of great military significance, and its development accelerated considerably during the following years. However, most of this development took place in secret, and so the stream of bibliographical material and hardware from Europe to Argentina gradually dried up.

In this situation, Susini was offered a great opportunity resulting from his military experience. After the end of the war in late 1918, he was sent to France to study the effect of chemical warfare on the respiratory system. While conducting his research, he was able to procure radio communications hardware from the formerly belligerent armies, which he later smuggled back to Argentina.

=== First Broadcast ===
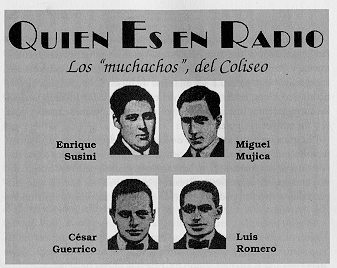
The four Locos de la Azotea

After returning to Argentina in 1919, Susini started working on the conversion of an old circus site into the Teatro Coliseo theater. Together with his friends, he started planning for a radio transmission from there, strongly supported by the two Italian owners, Faustino da Rossa and Walter Mocchi.

During 1920, while the group was working on the project, news reached them of Marconi's successful broadcast of a concert of Nellie Melba in Chelmsford that had taken place on June 15. Even though it was somewhat of a disappointment that their broadcast would not be the world's first, the preparations continued at a rapid pace.

On August 27, they were finally ready. The theatre was showing the opera Parsifal by Richard Wagner. Susini and his coworkers had set up a 5W transmitter on the roof using a RS-5 Telefunken tube, operating in 350m, along with a wire antenna connected to the dome on top of a neighboring building. To pick up the sound in the theater, they used a microphone originally designed to aid people with hearing loss.

Around 8:30 pm, Susini himself took the microphone and inaugurated regular radio broadcast service in Argentina with the words:

Señoras y señores, la Sociedad Radio Argentina les presenta hoy el Festival Sacro de Ricardo Wagner, Parsifal, con la actuación del tenor Maestri...

(Ladies and gentlemen, the Radio Argentina Society today presents you the [opera] Parsifal by Richard Wagner, featuring the tenor Maestri...)

The transmission continued for about three hours and was received as far as Santos in Brazil, where it was picked up by a ship's radio operator. The number of listeners was limited, since the crystal set radios used at the time were rare and difficult to operate, requiring tedious fine-tuning of a lead glass crystal and installation of a wire antenna several meters long. But the newspaper La Razón published a raving review, and even president Hipólito Yrigoyen commended Susini and his group for their accomplishment.

=== Radio Argentina ===
During the next 19 days, the group continued to broadcast from the theater, transmitting mostly Italian operas such as Verdi's Aida and Rigoletto. After the season at the Teatro Coliseo was over, they started creating productions under their own name. By now they officially called their station "Radio Argentina". Radio Argentina would continue broadcasting until its demise on December 31, 1997.

At first, it was run solely by the four friends. The polyglot Susini himself performed songs in Spanish, French, German, Italian and Russian, assuming a different stage name each time so the listeners would not notice.

During the following years, radio broadcasting in Argentina saw a quick expansion. In 1921, Buenos Aires mayor Juan Barnetche introduced official broadcasting licenses. In the same year, Radio Club Argentina was founded, becoming the first such association on American soil. In October 1922, Radio Argentina broadcast live from the inauguration of president Marcelo Torcuato de Alvear, an historic first. Two months later, the first competitors arrived - Italian-owned Corporación Argentina de Radio Sud América, Radio Brusa and Radio Cultura, all three founded within an interval of three days.

In 1924, the radio industry in Argentina went through a brief crisis, during which Radio Argentina had to be financially supported by an association of industrialists named Asociación Argentina de Broadcasting. While competitor Radio Sud América went into bankruptcy, and was taken over by Radio Argentina, Radio Argentina itself survived, even though it had to briefly adopt the name of its benefactors. The station now broadcast from the famous Teatro Colón opera as well as from the (Tango-) Club Abdullah, and other venues. Adding to the variety of the schedule was Argentina's first regular radio journal.

1925 saw the introduction of mandatory callsigns for radio stations, and from now on the station was known as LOR Radio Argentina (changed 1934 into LR2 Radio Argentina, it being the second station on the dial from the left). It also entered a collaboration with the daily newspaper Crítica, remaining under the direction of Susini and his friends but adopting the name "LOR Broadcasting de Crítica". This arrangement lasted a little more than a year, before the station returned to its original name and ownership.

=== Vía Radiar ===
By now, Susini and his partners were focusing on another project. Immediately after reacquiring the station from Crítica, they sold it to Radio Prieto, using the money to create a radiotelegraphy company, Sociedad Anónima Radio Argentina, constituted on August 31, 1927.

The company soon entered the market of short-wave radio communication between South America and Europe, receiving a "concession for an international radio telegraphy service allowing direct communication between Spain and Argentina" from the Spanish government.

With its relay stations in Paraguay, New York City and Madrid, the company, operating under the brand name "Vía Radiar", had considerable financial success. Moving aggressively against competitors by reducing prices, it soon managed to control the majority of radio traffic between Argentina and Europe, in close cooperation with the Spanish administration's telegraph service.

In 1930, the company was sold to ITT for the very substantial sum of 200 million US Dollar. Susini and his friends remained on the board of directors under the new ownership.

== Lumiton Film ==
One year later, Susini, by now married to singer Alicia Arderius, and his three companions founded the film company Lumiton (from Spanish luminosidad and tono: "light" and "sound"), which would become one of the major players during the following decade, known as the "Golden Age of Argentine Cinema".

With equipment bought during a trip to the United States, the four partners set up the most modern film studio in the country at the time, which included its own laboratory. The studio released its first film, Los Tres Berretines, on May 19, 1933. It was the second sound film in Argentina, preceded only by competitor Sono Film's Tango, released about three weeks earlier on April 27. Though officially credited collectively to "Equipo Lumiton", it had actually been directed by Susini himself.

In total, 99 films were released by the company with its trademark gong. Among the most notable was 1938 Venice Film Festival entry La chismosa, starring Lola Membrives, also directed by Susini himself. Lumiton continued producing feature films until 1957.

== Other activities ==
Even while leading his various companies, Susini remained active in the cultural domain. He was in charge of Teatro Coliseo during several seasons in the 1920s, and served as technical director of the famous Teatro Colón. After setting in scene the opera Oberon in 1938 at the Teatro Reale in Rome to great critical acclaim, he was called to work as director at the Scala in Milan.

Later he also worked at the "Teatro Argentino de La Plata". During his life, Susini authored more than seventy theater plays, receiving the National Culture Award in 1951 for his comedy En un viejo patio porteño ("In an old Buenos Aires back yard"). Furthermore, he was known as an excellent concert pianist.

Also in 1951, Susini returned to his roots as broadcast pioneer, working as director of photography during Argentina's first television broadcast on October 17.

Finally, in 1962, Susini founded the cooperative phone company TELPIN in Pinamar, opening the way for a series of popular local phone companies in Argentina. TELPIN is still in business today as a modern telecommunications company offering a broad range of phone and internet services.

== Legacy ==
Although he definitely did not perform the world's first radio broadcast, an honor that belongs to Enrico Marconi, Susini is often credited, especially in Argentine publications, with the establishment of the world's first regular radio broadcast service.

A final evaluation of this claim is not easy, since there were many experimental audio broadcasts in various countries at the time. However, what remains certain is that Susini established the first radio broadcast station in South America on his personal initiative, overcoming serious difficulties in the process. Even though Susini himself has remained relatively unknown, even in his home country, the significance of his pioneering feat was acknowledged in 1970 by the establishment of August 27 as National Broadcast Day (Día de la Radiodifusión) in Argentina, annually celebrated by the country's radio stations.

== Selected filmography ==
- It Always Ends That Way (1939)
