= Carlos Balá =

Argentine actor (1925–2022)

Carlitos Balá
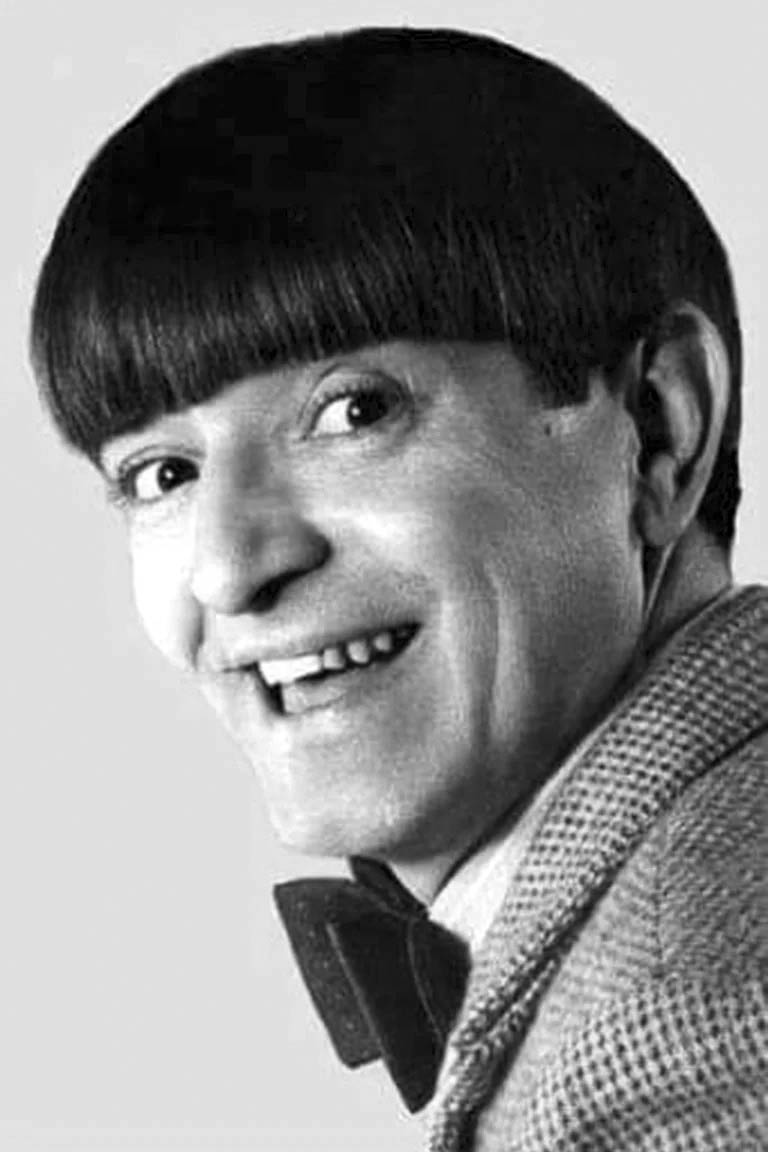
- Balá c. 1965
- Born: Carlos Salim Balaa Boglich; 13 August 1925; Buenos Aires, Argentina
- Died: 22 September 2022 (aged 97); Buenos Aires, Argentina
- Occupations: Comedian; actor
- Spouse: Martha Venturiello (m. 1962)
- Children: 2

Carlos Salim Balaa Boglich (13 August 1925 – 22 September 2022), known as Carlitos Balá, was an Argentine actor who specialized in children's entertainment. His trademarks were his bowl-cut hairstyle and nonsense catchphrases that include "¿Qué gusto tiene la sal?" (what is the taste of salt?), "un gestito de idea" (a gesture of idea), "un kilo y dos pancitos" (one kilo and two buns). "observe y saque fotocopia" (watch and make a photocopy), among others. Balá also created a large gallery of characters (played by himself on his show) that include Petronilo, Angueto the invisible dog, Indeciso, and Miserio.

Balá had a weekly television show, cementing his status at the top of children's entertainment, on par with Alberto Olmedo (as Capitán Piluso) and José Marrone. The show featured Angueto, an invisible dog, which Balá would pull around on a taut leash. In addition to summertime tours of Argentina, Balá starred in several family-oriented films, most notably in the Canuto Cañete series in the 1960s.

Balá is recognised for his contribution to humor and Argentine television over 50 years of artistic career.

== Biography ==
He was born in the neighborhood of Chacarita, Buenos Aires, to a Syrian butcher (Mustafá Balaá) from Damascus and a Croatian mother (Juana Boglich). He lived the first years of his life in a historic building known as the Yellow House.

His younger sister Norma encouraged him to do theater; he even wanted him to participate in a school play, but Carlos was very shy. However, he made jokes in the Línea 39 colectivo, where he worked to overcome his shyness.

In the beginning Balá took part in a contest that he won, under the name of Carlos Valdez. His father was listening to the radio when he came out the winner but he did not recognize him because Carlitos had changed his last name for fear of being challenged. Knowing that he had won and that his father did not know it was him, he decided to change and call himself Carlos Balá, keeping the similarity with his real surname. He then decided to go into radio, where he played a very nervous character who made him laugh from day one.

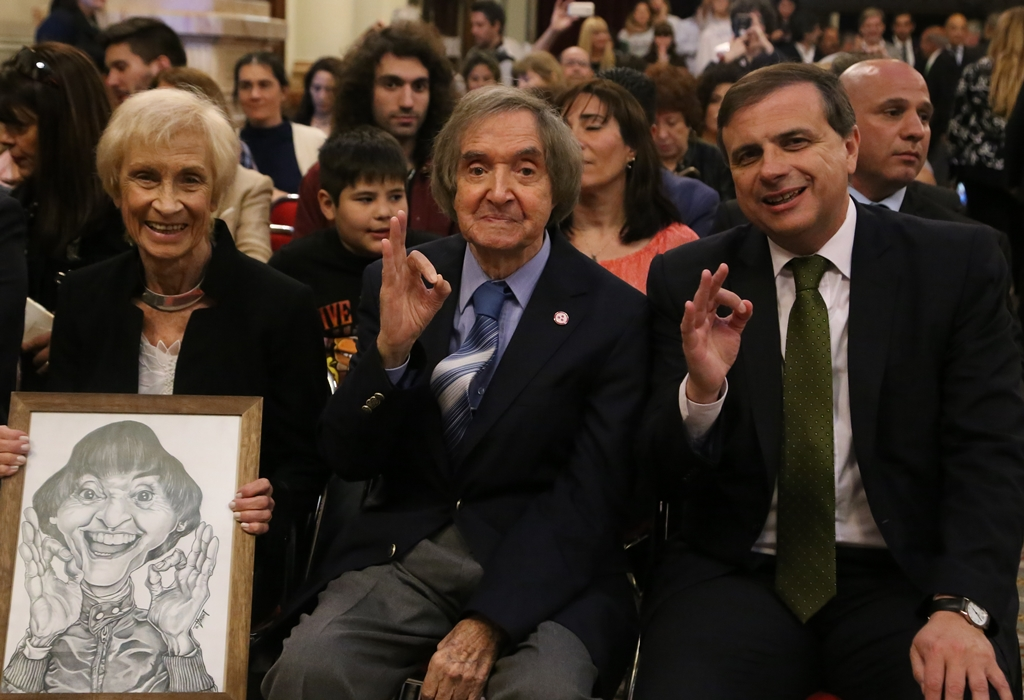
Balá being honored by the Chamber of Deputies of Argentina in 2017. His wife (at the left) is holding a caricature of him

In the years before cable television, he had a weekly program that was successful in children's entertainment along with El Capitán Piluso (played by Alberto Olmedo) and El circo de Marrone starred by José Marrone.

Balá was a supporter of football club Chacarita Juniors. On several occasions a flag with Balá's figure was placed in the stands of Chacarita stadium. He was tempted by various groups of the club to run for president of the club but he always and emphatically refused because he believed that the club did not need him at that time. In November 2018, at the request of the club, the artist Jorge Pagliano painted a mural with the image of Balá on one of the stadium walls.

Chacarita is my neighborhood and my club. That is to say that Chacarita is my life. My origins are there, as are my childhood, my adolescence and my youth. Thanks to those who made this mural, it's wonderful, and thanks to the people of the club. I am very excited, because they have reminded me of what Chacarita means to me.

— Balá about the mural dedicated to him

In the mid-1950s, close to turning thirty, he met eighteen-year-old Martha Venturiello, with whom he had a seven-year courtship until his marriage in 1962. Shortly after, they had two children, Laura and Martín . They remained together for nearly seventy years, from 1955 until his death. He stated on several occasions that she was his love "for life".

On 22 September 2022, he died at the age of ninety-seven, after being admitted to the Güemes Sanatorium, located in the neighborhood of Palermo, after suffering a bout of hypotension.

== Career ==
=== Early career ===
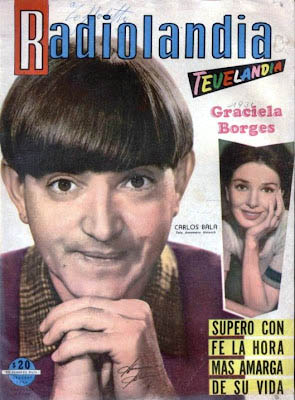
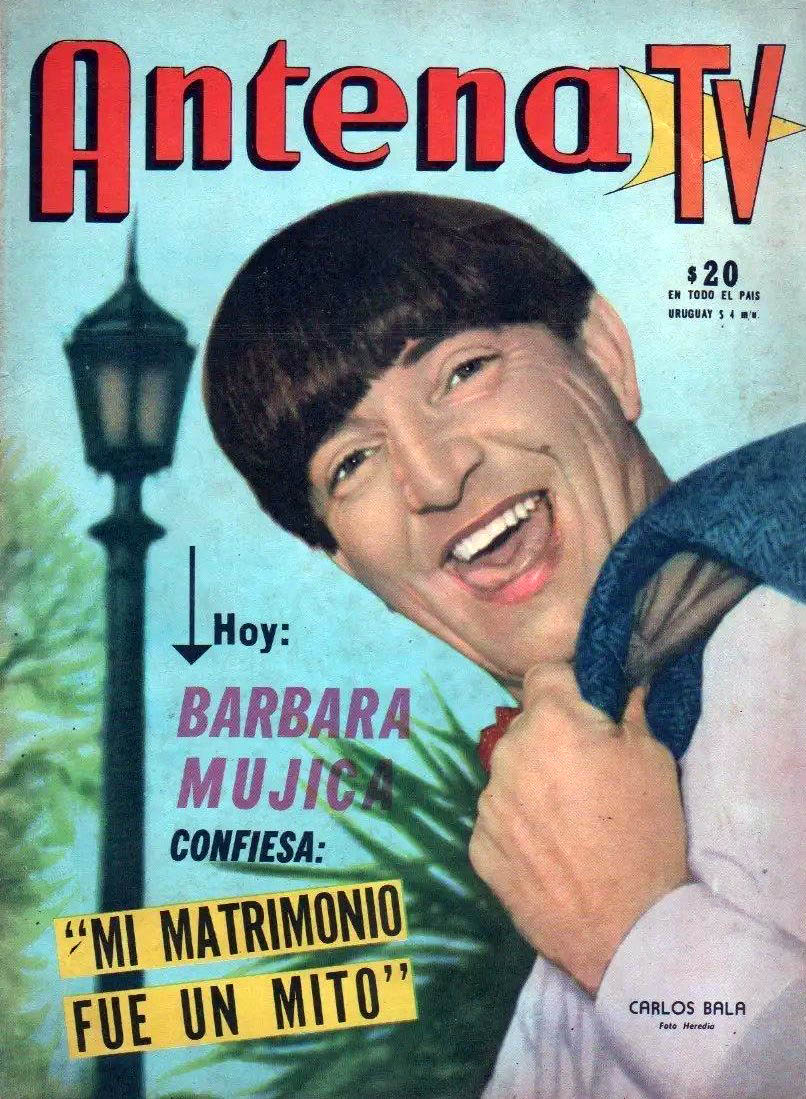
The raising popularity of Balá in early 1960s, displayed on the covers of Radiolandia (left, 1963), and Antena (1964)

Balá made his professional debut in 1955, being hired by Délfor Dicásolo to be part of the team of La revista dislocada, a successful variety show broadcast on Radio Splendid that was considered a birthplace of artists.

After a disagreement with Dicásolo in 1958, Balá left the program and formed a comedy trio with Jorge Marchesini and Alberto Locati starring in Los tres..., on Radio El Mundo, along with announcer Antonio Carrizo. The trio became very popular and participated in El show de Andy Russell. Then they starred in ¡Qué plato!, and were together until 1960. Later, each one started their own career individually. Balá managed to establish himself solidly in the show.

=== Recognition and popularity ===
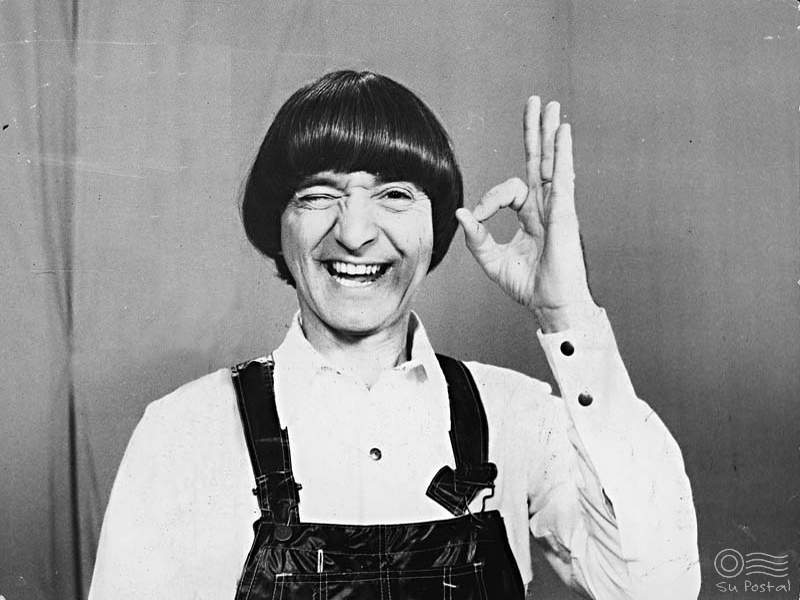
"Gestito de idea", Balá's hand gesture became one of his most recognisable gags

He began to participate in La Telekermese Musical on Canal 7, he was also offered to be Joe Bazooka and collaborated in El show de Antonio Prieto and in El show de Paulette Christian. In addition, he played his character Jacobo Gómez on Radio Splendid. In 1962 he participated in Telecómicas, on Canal 9 and in Calle Corrientes, on Canal 7 as well as in El show super 9 with Mirtha Legrand and Duilio Marzio. In 1963 he made his debut in the theatrical play Canuto Cañete, conscripto del siete, and due to his great success on Canal 9, he was hired to host his own program, Balamicina. At the end of that year he filmed the film version of Canuto Cañete.... In 1964 he was hired by Canal 13 to star in El soldado Balá, and began a long television career during the sixties and seventies with the programs El flequillo de Balá (1965–66), El clan de Balá (1967, with scripts by Juan Carlos Mesa, Jorge Basurto, and Carlos Garaycochea); Nicolás Mancera's Sábados Circulares, El circus show by Carlitos Balá, El circo mágico de Carlitos Balá (1973), and El show de Carlitos Balá.

He participated in eighteen family comedy films, such as Canuto Cañete y los 40 ladrones, ¡Esto es alegría!, Brigada en acción, el tío disparate, Qué hermosa es mi familia!, among others. In 1979 he was hired to star in El show de Carlitos Balá, working in the intervened state channel Canal 7. He then went on several inland tours with the circus.

In 1987, Cacho Fontana hired Balá to be part of the television program Sábados de la bondad. Then he was summoned again by ATC. That same year he returned with El show de Carlitos Balá, which won a Martín Fierro Awards for best children's program.

In 1988 the program went to Canal 2, and that same year he made one of his last film appearances in Tres alegres fugitivos.

=== Later works ===
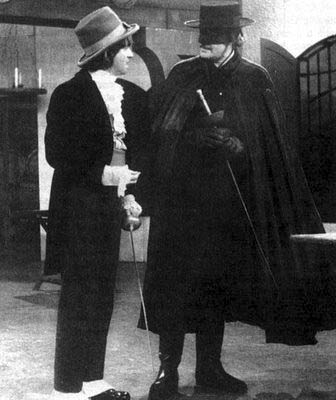
With Guy Williams as Zorro in a 1973 Argentine TV appearance

In 1990, ATC produced a program with Carlitos Balá and the troupe of Margarito Tereré that lasted only a short time on the air. In 1995 he starred in To play with Teddy and Carlitos Balá. Later he participated in TV programs Son de diez, and Como vos y yo, aired on Canal 13.

On 2 September 2009, he was invited to Justo a tiempo, a program hosted by Julián Weich, where promised to donate his famous Chupetómetro to continue the tradition of helping kids give up the pacifier. He himself said that he had it in the "living room" of his house and invited kids to leave their pacifier when they visited him.

In addition, he toured the interior of Argentina with his circus. In 2009 he accompanied the clown Piñón Fijo in his show and in 2011 he participated together with the children's host Laura Franco in the show Panam y circo as special guest.

== Filmography ==
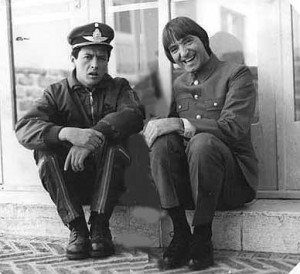
Balá (right) with Palito Ortega in Dos locos en el aire, 1976

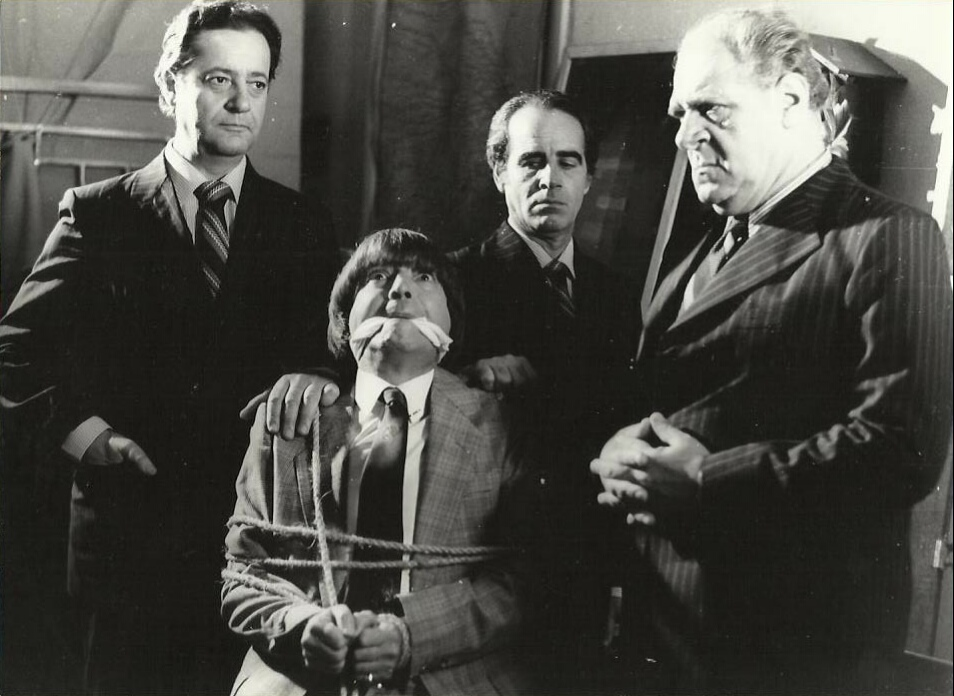
Promotional photo of Cosa de locos, 1981

- Canuto Cañete, conscripto del siete (1963)
- Canuto Cañete y los 40 ladrones (1965)
- Canuto Cañete, detective privado (1965)
- La muchachada de a bordo (1967)
- ¡Esto es alegría! (1967)
- Somos los mejores (1968)
- Dos locos en el aire (1976)
- Brigada en acción (1980)
- El tío Disparate (1978)
- Las locuras del profesor (1979)
- La carpa del amor (1979)
- Vivir con alegría (1979)
- Locos por la música (1980)
- ¡Qué linda es mi familia! (1980)
- Cosa de locos (1981)
- Un loco en acción (1983)
- Los matamonstruos en la mansión del terror (1987)
- Tres alegres fugitivos (1988)
- Soledad y Larguirucho (2012)

== Discography ==
Albums recorded by Balá include:

=== Studio albums ===
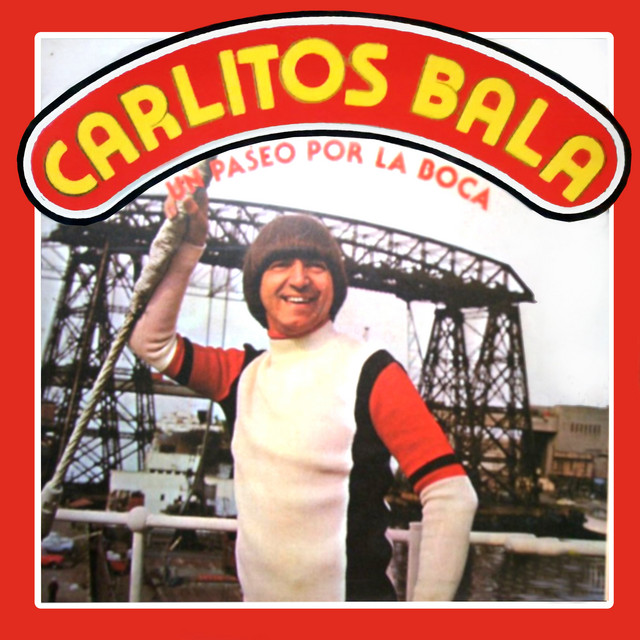
Un paseo por La Boca (1978)

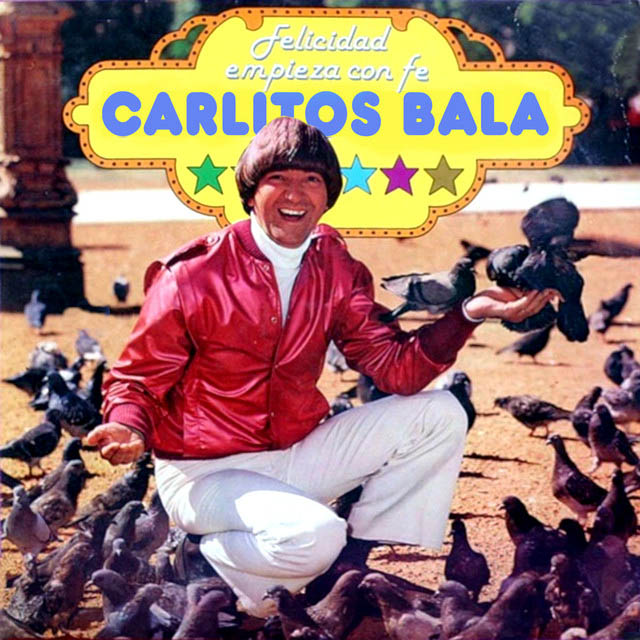
Felicidad empieza con fe (1981)

- El Circus Show de Carlitos Balá (1971)
- El circo Carlitos Balá (1973)
- El show de Carlitos Balá (1973)
- El especial de Balá (1975)
- Papá Balá (1976) (Note: Christmas songs. The name "papá Balá" is a reference to "papá noel", Santa Claus name used mostly in Latin American countries.)
- Y qué gusto tiene la sal? (1977)
- Un paseo por La Boca (1978)
- Ganó la bandera (1978)
- Cantemos en familia (1980)
- 3 minutitos de alegría (1981)
- Felicidad empieza con fe (1981)
- Mi corazón late feliz (1982)
- Aquí llegó Balá (2002) (Note: Balá's greatest hits sang along other musical artists.)

=== Compilations ===
- Los Grandes Éxitos De Carlitos Balá (1978)
- El show de Carlitos (1979)
- Aquí llegó Balá (1979)
- Un gestito de idea (1980)
- Los marineritos (1980)
- Niños del mundo felicidad (1981)
- Aquí llegó Balá (1987)
- 20 super éxitos (1995)
- Los éxitos de Carlitos Balá (1997)
- Lo mejor de mi repertorio (2008)
- Las más lindas canciones de Carlitos Balá (2011)

== Legacy ==
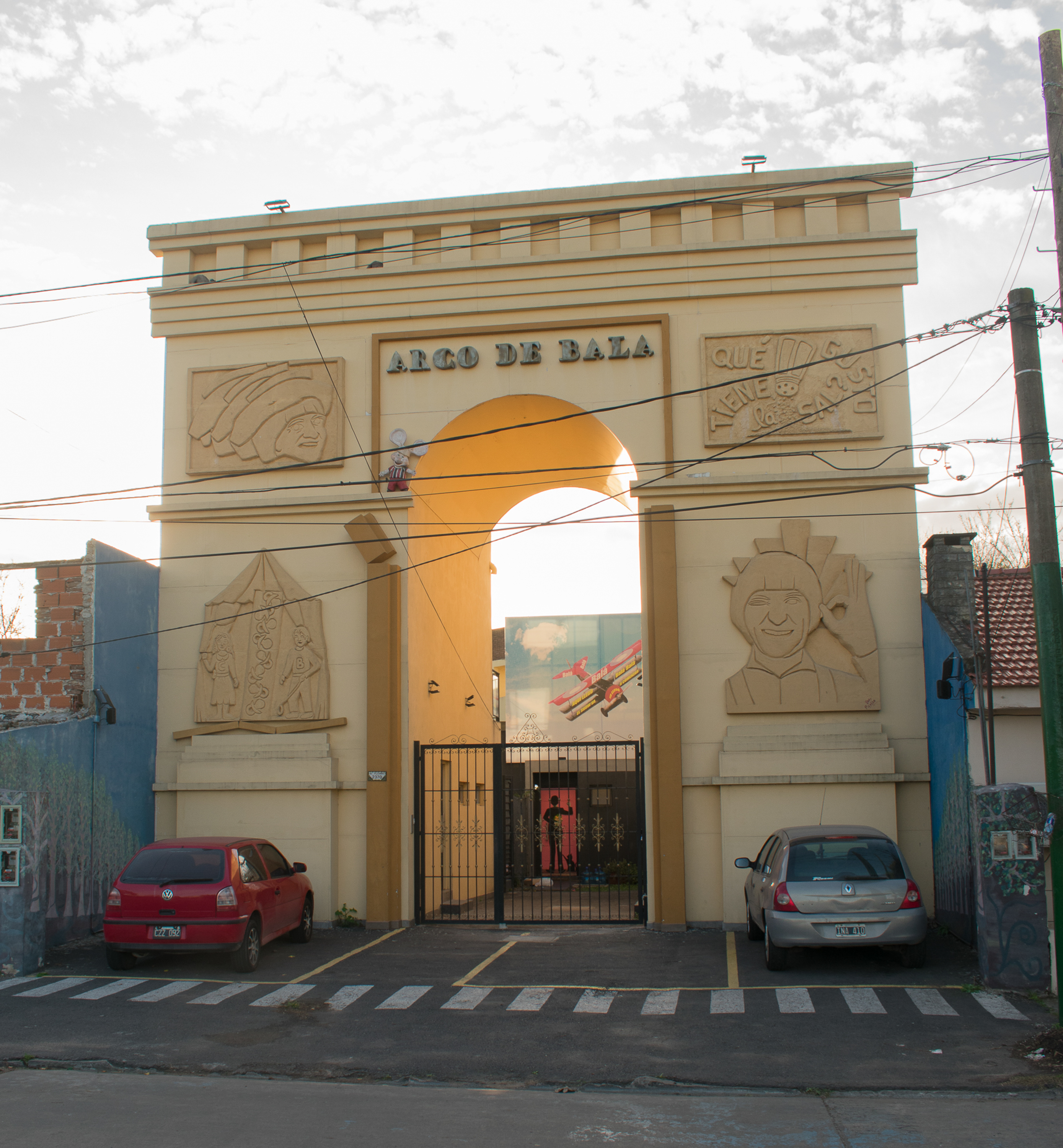
Arco del Triunfo de Carlitos Balá", a replica of Arc de Triomphe in Ituzaingó, Buenos Aires

On 11 December 2009, the Legislature of the Autonomous City of Buenos Aires declared him an Outstanding Cultural Personality.

That same year, the musical band Los Auténticos Decadentes released their own version of the song Aquí llegó Balá, which had been used as a musical interlude in program El Show de Carlitos Balá. This version had the collaboration of Balá himself, singing at the beginning of the song and saying some of his most famous catchphrases. On the other hand, Andrés Ciro Martínez, the leader of the band Los Piojos, danced with a Carlos Balá mask in the video for the song El spa de los doctores crotos, also published in 2009.

On 22 May 2011, Balá received recognition for his career at the Martín Fierro Awards. That same year, colectivo line 39 decided to plot the windows of its buses with an image of Balá as a gift to his 86th. birthday.

In 2016 Balá visited Pope Francis at Vatican City, being also declared "Ambassador for Peace". In April 2017 the Buenos Aires City Legislature declared Balá "distinguished citizen of the city". In October that same year, Balá was awarded an honorable mention as a recognition to his outstanding career as artist.

In March 2019 architect Rubén Díaz inaugurated the "Arco del Triunfo de Carlitos Balá", a replica of Parisian Arc de Triomphe in the city of Villa Arisa in Ituzaingó Partido, Greater Buenos Aires. The Line 39 also honored Balá for his last birthday with the artistic work Carlitos Balá Iluminado, a lightwall graffiti on the company terminal building, The work, made by artist Alejandro Marmo, which would be the last tribute to Balá while he was still alive.
