= Miguel Ángel Lauri =

Argentine footballer and manager (1908-1994)

Personal information
- Full name: Miguel Angel Lauri
- Date of birth: August 29, 1908
- Place of birth: Zárate, Argentina
- Date of death: September 26, 1994 (aged 86)
- Place of death: La Plata, Argentina
- Positions: Midfielder; striker

Youth career
- Estrella de Berisso

Senior career*
Years	Team	Apps	(Gls)
1928–1937	Estudiantes	158	(42)
1937–1939	Sochaux	61	(?)
1939–?	Peñarol	35	(?)

International career
1928–1935	Argentina	10	(1)
1937	France	1	(0)

Managerial career
- 1955: Estudiantes de La Plata
- * Club domestic league appearances and goals

Miguel Ángel Lauri, known in France as Michel Lauri (August 29, 1908 – September 26, 1994), was a footballer, he played for Estudiantes de La Plata. Born in Argentina and of French descent, Lauri represented both the Argentina national football team, and France national football team.

== Career ==
Lauri made his debut for Estudiantes in 1928 during the amateur era of Argentine football. He made his debut for the Argentina national team in 1929.

In the early 1930s, after the professionalisation of the Argentine game, Lauri was part of the famous Estudiantes attacking lineup known as Los Profesores (The Professors). He earned the nickname Flecha de Oro (Golden Arrow) for his powerful right footed shooting ability.

Lauri made an appearance in the 1933 film Los tres berretines (The Three Whims), a comedy about a family obsessed with football, tango and cinema.

In 1935 Lauri played in the Copa América where he scored his only goal for the national team, they eventually lost in the final to Uruguay.

In 1937 Lauri was signed by French club Sochaux-Montbéliard, he was part of the French league winning campaign of 1938.

Lauri played one game for the France A side in 1937 making him one of only four Argentines to play for France.

In 1939 with the Second World War looming Lauri left France and returned to South America, where he played for Peñarol in Uruguay.

== Titles ==
Season	Team	Title
1938	Sochaux-Montbéliard	French league
1937	Sochaux-Montbéliard	French Cup

== Sources ==
- Coll. L'intégrale de l'équipe de France de football, Paris, First, 1998, p. 100 and 453
- Miguel Ángel Lauri at National-Football-Teams.com
- Profile at French federation official website (in French)
