= Argentine humour =

Argentine humour is exemplified by a number of humorous television programmes, film productions, comic strips and other types of media. Everyday humour includes jokes related to recurrent themes, such as xenophobic jokes at the expense of Galicians (Spaniards) called chistes de gallegos (where they are commonly portrayed as simpletons), often obscene sex-related jokes (chistes verdes, literally "green jokes", a term equivalent to the English-language "blue humour"), jokes about the English, the Americans, blonde women, dark humour (called humor negro), word and pronunciation games, jokes about Argentines themselves, etc.

== Television shows ==
There are and have been many humorous Argentine television shows, of many genres and themes. Many artists focus on political humour. Shows include Cha Cha Cha, Todo por dos pesos, Caiga Quien Caiga commonly referred to as CQC, El Show de Videomatch, etc.

Notable television comedians include Juan Verdaguer, Tato Bores, Alberto Olmedo, Jorge Porcel, Antonio Gasalla, Jorge Guinzburg, Alfredo Casero, Juan Carlos Mareco, Gianni Lunadei, Guillermo Francella, and most recently, Diego Capusotto. Many of these and others have also appeared in numerous comedy roles in Argentine cinema, notably Olmedo, Porcel, Francella, Niní Marshall, Luis Sandrini, and Javier Portales.

Between the 1960s and the late 1980s, there was an important influence of Uruguayan humorists. Ricardo Espalter, Enrique Almada, Raimundo Soto, Eduardo D'Angelo, Julio Frade, Berugo Carámbula, Henny Trayles and Gabriela Acher were active in many television programs, such as Jaujarana, Hupumorpo, Comicolor, Híperhumor.

== Comic strips and comic books ==
Quino's Mafalda is one of the internationally best-known Argentine comic strips and comic-book series. Its humour is related to local and international politics.

Caricaturist Andrés Cascioli edited and created cover art for one of the nation's longest-running satirical publications, Humor, which ran from 1978 to 1999, and frequently met with censorship. Maitena is another successful comic-book writer, dealing with women and family values.

Fontanarrosa was another famous Argentine cartoonist, known for his comic strip Inodoro Pereyra featuring a gaucho.

See: Gaturro, Macanudo, Yo, Matías

== Literary humour ==
Humour can be found in the works of some of Argentina's best-known writers. For example, Jorge Luis Borges was known for his dry, sometimes dark, humour. He begins his story "The Dread Redeemer Lazarus Morrell" by describing Bartolomé de las Casas as having taken pity on the natives suffering and dying in the mines of the Antilles, thereby leading the Spanish government to relieve their suffering by importing African slaves to suffer and die in the mines of the Antilles. His one-paragraph short story "On Accuracy in Science", probably inspired by a remark of Lewis Carroll's, imagines a map drawn at 1:1 scale, so that it covers the entire country that it illustrates. Borges and another of the country's leading writers, Adolfo Bioy Casares, created the pseudonymous H. Bustos Domecq, under whose name they wrote, among other things, comic detective fiction.

== Theatre and Stand-up comedy ==
Numerous comedy theatre actors earned renown among Argentine audiences over the years, including Florencio Parravicini, José Marrone, Pepe Biondi, Niní Marshall, Juan Carlos Altavista, Antonio Gasalla, and others. Well-known Argentine stand-up comics include Enrique Pinti and Luis Landriscina.

== Musical comedy ==
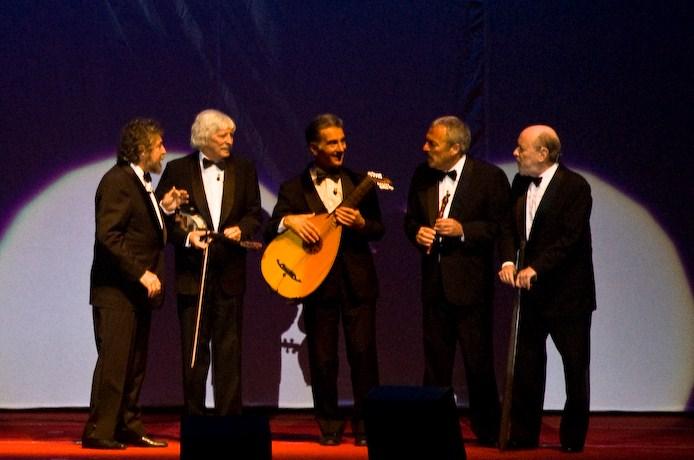
Les Luthiers

Established in 1967, Les Luthiers is the nation's best-known musical troupe, and are known for inventing many of their instruments. Midachi, a musical comedy trio established in 1983, was also popular both on stage and on television.

== Sex comedies ==
Argentine sex comedy films have been popular since the 1960s.
