= Uruguayan Argentine =

Uruguayan Argentines Uruguayo-argentino
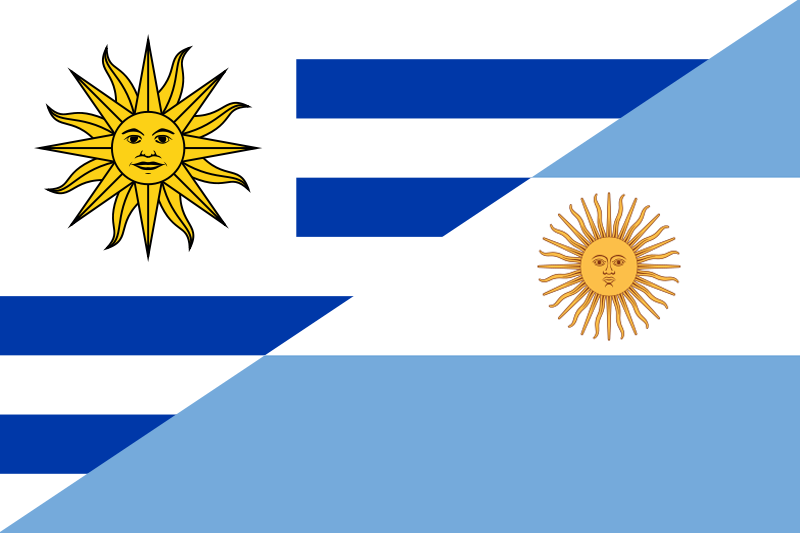

Total population
- 116,592 (2010 Census)

Regions with significant populations
- Buenos Aires; Rosario; Mar del Plata; Entre Ríos Province

Languages
- Rioplatense Spanish; Italian

Religion
- Christianity; Judaism

Related ethnic groups
- Paraguayan Argentines, Chilean Argentines, Spanish Argentines

A Uruguayan Argentine is an Argentine citizen of Uruguayan descent or a Uruguay-born person who resides in Argentina. As of 2012, there were over 116,000 Uruguayans living in Argentine territory.

== Overview ==
Current data estimates the figure of Uruguayans in Argentina at over 200,000 in 2017.

Many Uruguayan-born persons live in Argentina, for various reasons. Both countries share the same language, culture and ethnicity and their populations bear striking similarities; the historical origins of both nations is common (part of the Viceroyalty of the River Plate, Spanish Empire); both countries are members of MERCOSUR, there is no need for special migration documents, and circulation is relatively easy. Argentina has a much bigger economy, which has always attracted Uruguayans in search of opportunities; the cultural scene is intense, so many talented Uruguayan actors and entertainers have succeeded in their artistic careers in Argentina. And last, but not least, Uruguayans value and praise Argentina as a nice tourist and holidaying destination; especially as a "shopping paradise".

Uruguayan residents in Argentina have their own institutions, for instance, the Consultative Council in Buenos Aires or the Center of Uruguayan Residents in Mar del Plata "José Gervasio Artigas".

== History ==
The causes of Uruguayan immigration to Argentina are several. Among these, in addition to the 1973 Uruguayan coup d'état are: improved living conditions, job search, fleeing the economic, socio-cultural similarity with Argentina, among others. Most settled throughout the Argentine territory, but mainly in the City of Buenos Aires and the surrounding metropolitan area and the rest of the Buenos Aires Province.

A notable group of Uruguayan humorists developed their career on both countries, Argentina and Uruguay: Ricardo Espalter, Raimundo Soto, Eduardo D'Angelo, Julio Frade, Enrique Almada. During the 1960s, 1970s and 1980s they commuted frequently to record famous television comedies: Jaujarana, Hupumorpo, Comicolor, Híperhumor.

== Notable Uruguayan Argentines and Argentines with Uruguayan ancestors ==
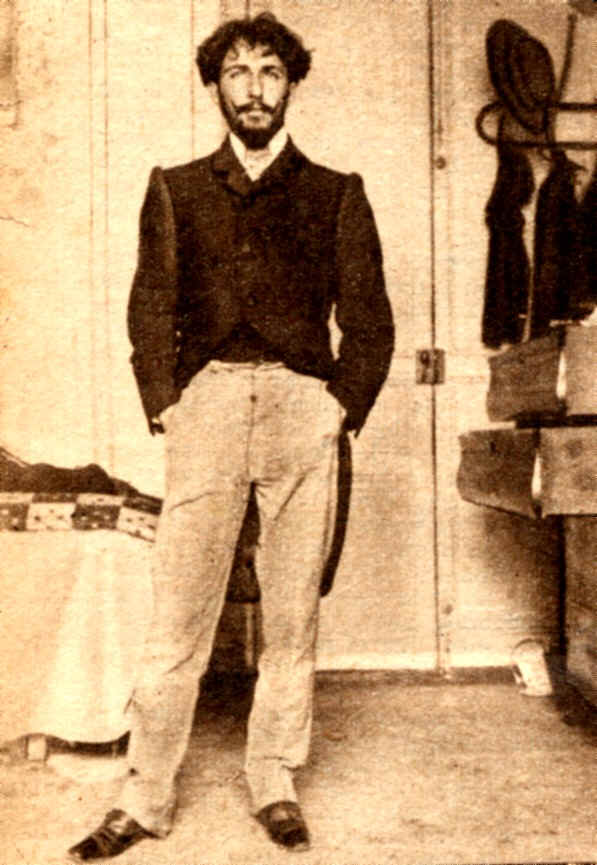
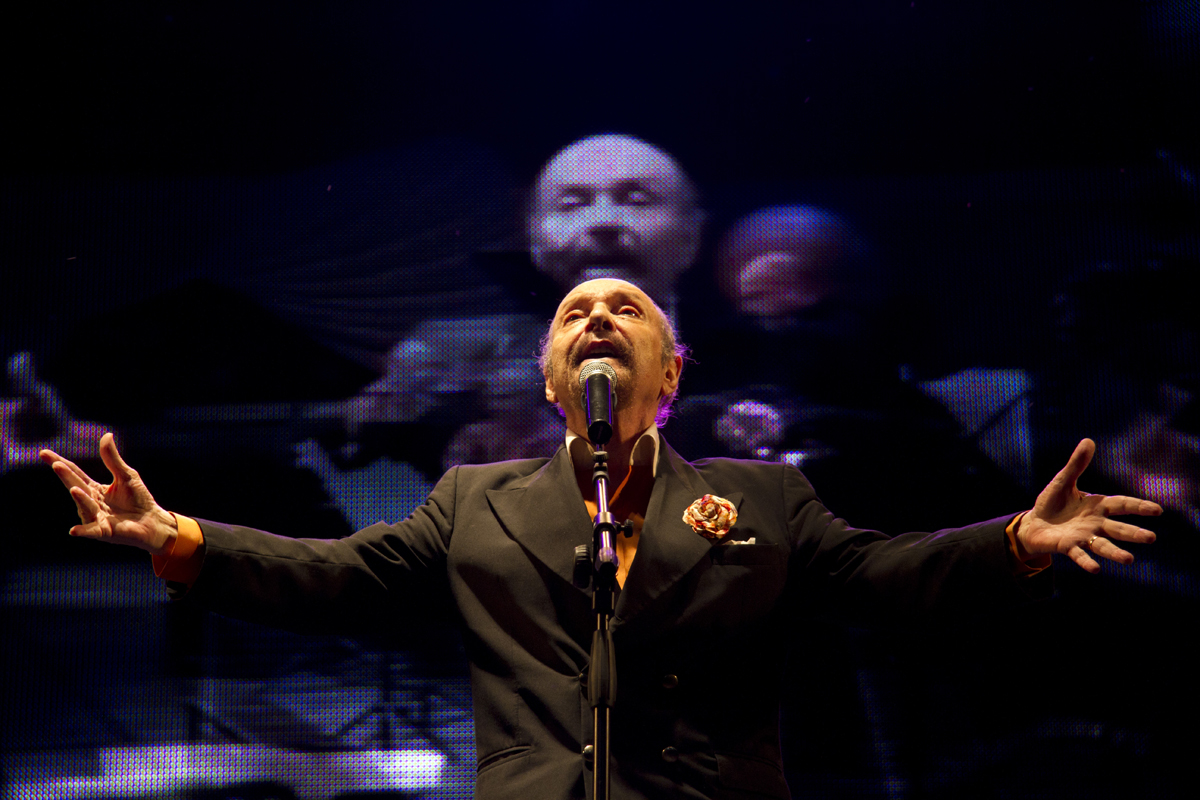
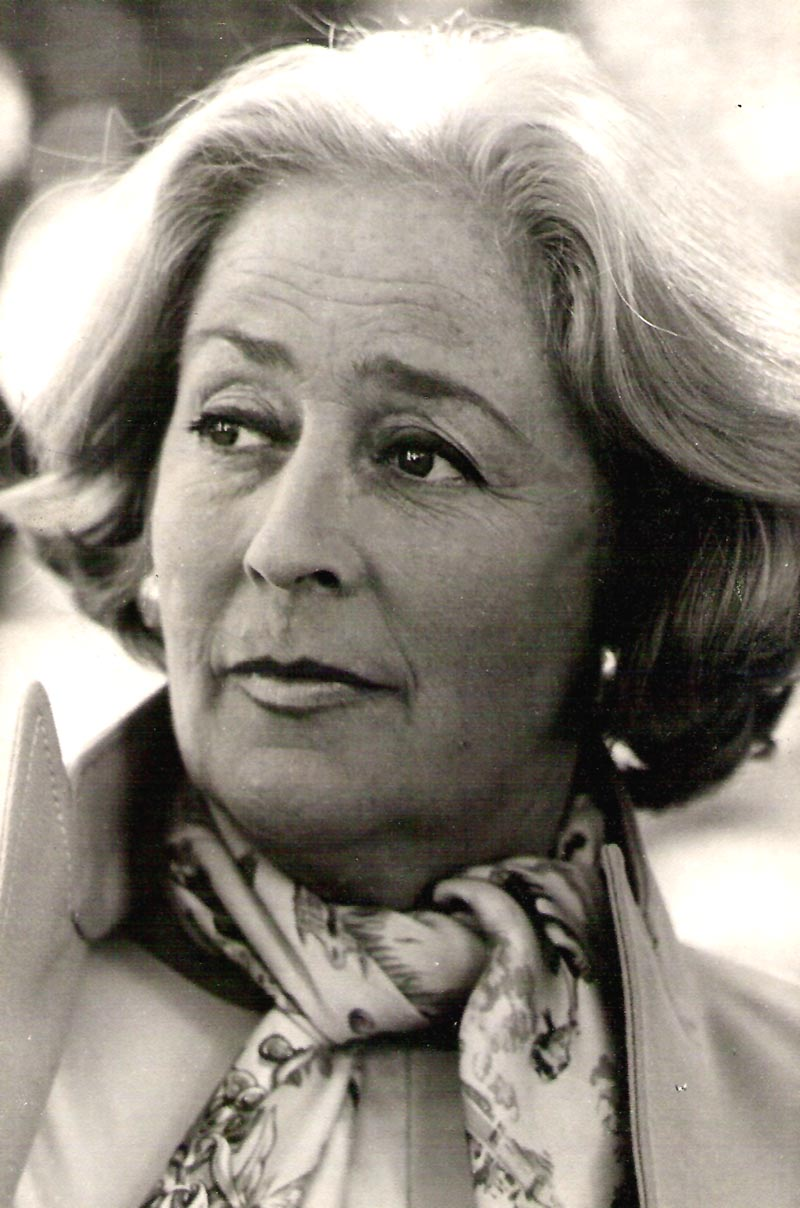
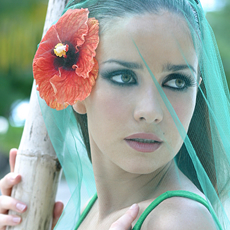
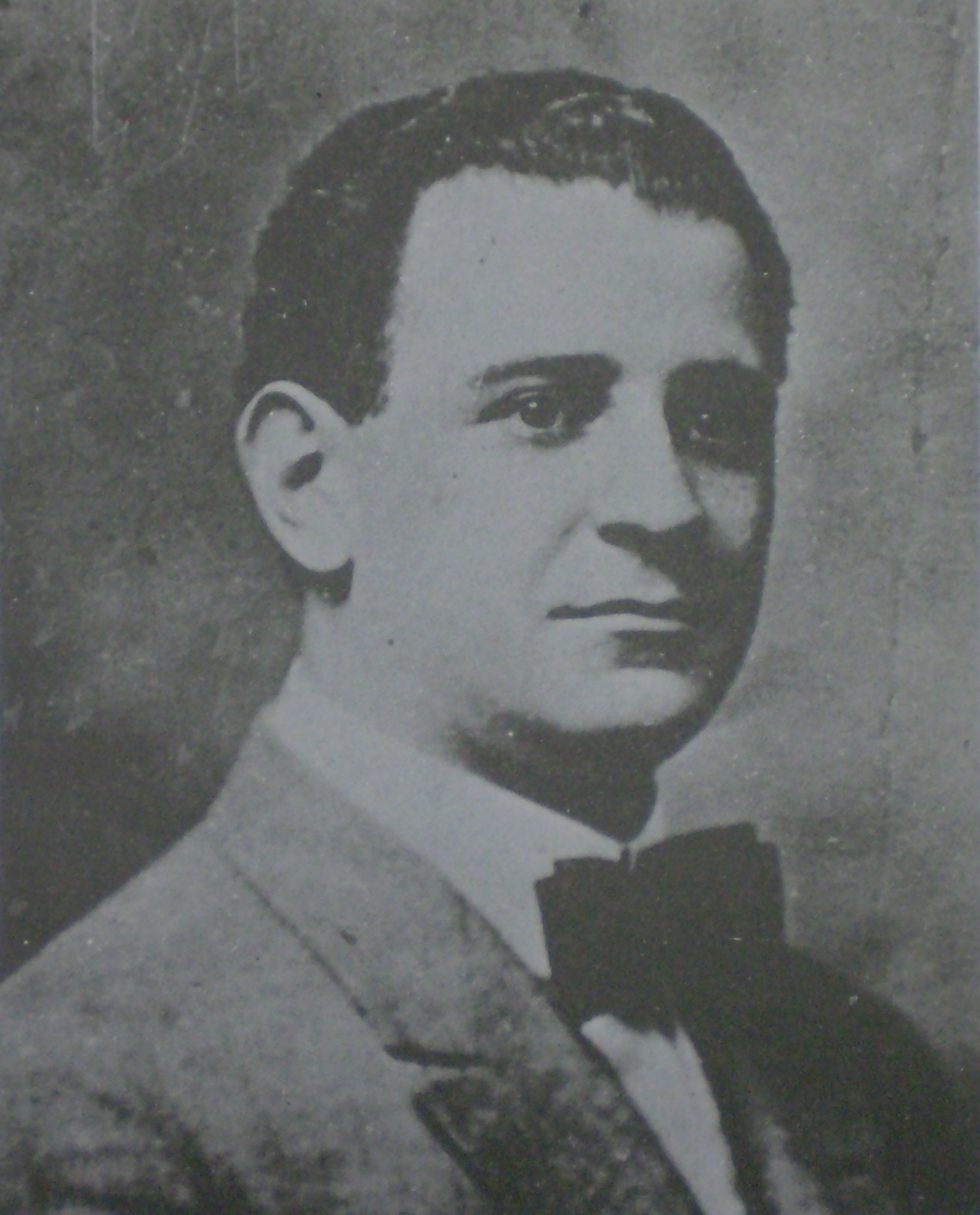
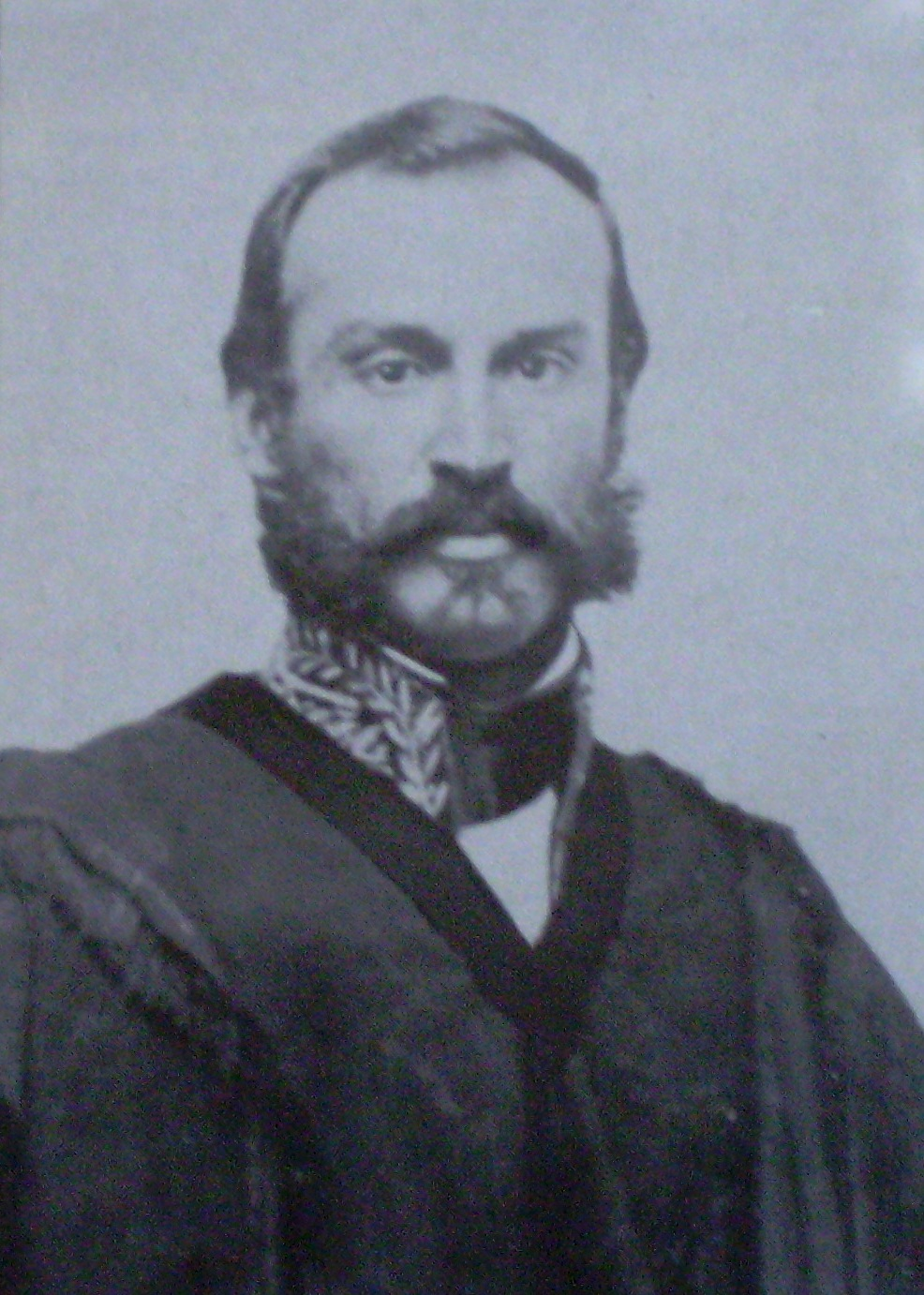
Horacio Quiroga, Horacio Ferrer, China Zorrilla, Natalia Oreiro, Enzo Bordabehere, Ricardo López Jordán

past

- María Abella de Ramírez (1863–1926), feminist writer
- Leonor Acevedo (1876-1975), mother and secretary of Jorge Luis Borges
- Torcuato de Alvear (1822-1890), politician, son and father of Presidents of Argentina
- Santiago Arrieta (1897-1975), actor
- Luis César Avilés (1938-2019), journalist and television presenter
- Enzo Bordabehere (1889-1935), lawyer and politician
- Jorge Luis Borges (1899-1986), writer
- Carlos Calvo (1824-1906), jurist and historian
- Miguel Cané (1851-1905), writer, lawyer, academic, journalist, and politician
- Manuel Campoamor (1877-1941), tango musician
- Berugo Carámbula (1945-2015), comedian
- Rubén W. Cavallotti (1924-1999), film director
- Juana del Pino y Vera Mujica (1786-1841), First Lady of Argentina as wife of Bernardino Rivadavia
- Horacio Ferrer (1933-2014), tango lyricist
- Santiago Gómez Cou (1903-1984), actor
- María Amalia Lacroze de Fortabat (1921-2012), businesswoman and philanthropist, related to Uruguayan president Manuel Oribe
- Libertad Lamarque (1908-2000), actress and singer
- Lorenzo Latorre (1844-1916), military dictator, spent his last years exiled in Argentina
- Irineo Leguisamo (1903-1985), jockey
- Tita Merello (1904-2002), tango singer and actress
- Nina Miranda (1925-2012), tango singer and composer
- Enrique Loedel Palumbo (1901–1962), physicist
- Ricardo López Jordán (1822–1889), soldier and politician
- Hilarión de la Quintana (1774-1843), military officer and governor of Tucumán
- Horacio Quiroga (1878-1937), short story writer
- Hermenegildo Sábat (1933-2018), caricaturist
- Enrique Saborido (1877–1941), tango musician
- Miguel Saiz (1949-2019), politician, governor of Río Negro Province
- Carlos Sherman (1934-2005), translator and activist
- Juan Manuel Tenuta (1924-2013), actor
- Henny Trayles (1937-2022), actress and comedian
- Luisa Vehil (1912-1991), actress
- Juan Verdaguer (1915-2001), humorist
- Emilio Vidal (1918-1994), actor and humorist
- Constancio C. Vigil (1876-1954), writer and publisher
- Tincho Zabala (1923-2001), actor
- Fabio Zerpa (1928-2019), ufologist
- China Zorrilla (1923-2014), actress

present

- Gabriela Acher, actress and comedian
- Eunice Castro, model and television presenter
- Mateo Chiarino, actor, writer, and director
- Mónica Farro, vedette
- Nicolás Furtado, actor
- María Noel Genovese, model and actress
- Andrea Ghidone, vedette
- Ernesto Goñi, footballer
- Daniel Hendler, actor
- Osvaldo Laport, actor
- Laura Malosetti Costa, essayist
- Víctor Hugo Morales, journalist
- Natalia Oreiro, actress

== See also ==
- Argentina–Uruguay relations
- Argentines in Uruguay
- Uruguayan diaspora
- Immigration to Argentina
