= List of sketch comedy television series =

List of television shows

This is a list of notable sketch comedy television series by country.

== Argentina ==
- Peter Capusotto y sus videos

== Australia ==
- Aunty Donna's Big Ol' House of Fun
- The Aunty Jack Show
- Australia You're Standing In It
- BackBerner
- Big Bite
- The Big Gig
- Big Girl's Blouse
- Black Comedy
- The Comedy Company
- Comedy Inc.
- The Comedy Sale
- The D-Generation
- DAAS Kapital
- Double the Fist
- Drunk History Australia
- Eagle & Evans
- The Elegant Gentleman's Guide to Knife Fighting
- Fancy Boy
- Fast Forward
- Full Frontal
- The Gillies Report
- The Gillies Republic
- Here's Dawn
- Hey Hey It's Saturday
- The Jesters
- Just for Laughs
- Kinne
- The Late Show
- Legally Brown
- Let Loose Live
- The Mavis Bramston Show
- The Micallef P(r)ogram(me)
- The Moth Effect
- The Naked Vicar Show
- One Size Fits All
- Open Slather
- Orange Is the New Brown
- The Paul Hogan Show
- Ratbags
- Raucous
- Real Stories
- The Ronnie Johns Half Hour
- The Russell Gilbert Show
- Shaun Micallef's Mad as Hell
- SkitHOUSE
- The Slot
- Something Stupid
- Thank God You're Here
- This is Littleton
- The True Blue Show
- TV Burp
- We Interrupt This Broadcast
- The Wedge
- Wednesday Night Fever
- Wham Bam Thank You Ma'am
- You're Skitting Me

== Belgium ==
- Schalkse Ruiters
- In de gloria

== Brazil ==
- Hermes & Renato
- TV Pirata
- Pânico na TV
- Show do Tom
- Zorra Total
- A Praça É Nossa
- CQC
- Porta dos Fundos

== Canada ==
- Air Farce
- Alan Hamel's Comedy Bag
- Baroness von Sketch Show
- The Beaverton
- Bizarre
- The Bobroom
- Brothers TV
- Buzz
- Bye Bye
- Caution: May Contain Nuts
- Charlie Had One But He Didn't Like It, So He Gave It To Us
- CODCO
- Comedy Inc.
- Double Exposure
- La Fin du monde est à 7 heures
- Four on the Floor
- Le Fric Show
- Funny Farm
- The Gavin Crawford Show
- The Hart and Lorne Terrific Hour
- The Hilarious House of Frightenstein
- History Bites
- The Holmes Show
- Hotbox
- House of Venus Show
- Howie Mandel's Sunny Skies
- HumanTown
- It's Only Rock & Roll
- Just for Laughs
- The Kids in the Hall
- LoadingReadyRun
- The Morgan Waters Show
- Le nouveau show
- Picnicface
- Point Blank
- Qanurli
- The Red Green Show
- Rick Mercer Report
- Rock et Belles Oreilles
- The Ron James Show
- The S and M Comic Book
- Samedi de rire
- The Second City Project
- Second City Television
- SketchCom
- Smith & Smith / The Comedy Mill
- SNL Québec
- Sons of Butcher
- Sunnyside
- Super Dave
- System Crash
- TallBoyz
- That's So Weird!
- This Hour Has 22 Minutes
- Tiny Plastic Men
- Truthhorse
- The Vacant Lot
- The Vent!
- Wayne and Shuster
- Y B Normal?
- You Can't Do That on Television
- Zut!

== Ecuador ==
- Enchufe Tv

== Finland ==
- Pulttibois
- Spede Show
- Tabu

== Indonesia ==
- Extravaganza

== India ==
- The Viral Fever

== Republic of Ireland ==
- Bull Island
- Dave Allen at Large / The Dave Allen Show

== Malaysia ==
- Senario

== The Netherlands ==
- Jiskefet
- Van Kooten en De Bie
- Draadstaal
- De TV Kantine
- Koefnoen

== New Zealand ==
- Back of the Y
- McPhail and Gadsby
- Pulp Sport
- Radiradirah
- A Week of It

== Norway ==
- Team Antonsen
- Tre brødre som ikke er brødre
- Uti vår hage

== Philippines ==
- Goin' Bulilit
- Banana Sundae
- Bubble Gang
- Lokomoko
- Wow Mali

== Singapore ==
- Just for Laughs Gags Asia

== United Kingdom ==
=== # ===
- 2DTV
- 3 Non-Blondes
- The 11 O'Clock Show

=== A ===
- Absolutely
- The Adam and Joe Show
- Alas Smith and Jones
- Al Murray's Multiple Personality Disorder
- Alexei Sayle's Merry-Go-Round
- Alexei Sayle's Stuff
- Alfresco
- The All New Alexei Sayle Show
- And There's More
- Anna & Katy
- The Armando Iannucci Shows
- Armstrong and Miller
- The Armstrong & Miller Show
- At Last the 1948 Show

=== B ===
- Balls of Steel
- Bang, Bang, It's Reeves and Mortimer
- Barking
- Barry Welsh Is Coming
- Before the Fringe
- Bellamy's People
- The Benny Hill Show
- Beyond a Joke
- The Big Impression
- Big Train
- A Bit of Fry & Laurie
- Blunder
- Bo' Selecta!
- Brass Eye
- Bremner, Bird and Fortune
- Broaden Your Mind
- Bruiser
- Burnistoun

=== C ===
- The Cannon and Ball Show
- Cardinal Burns
- The Catherine Tate Show
- Celebrity Soup
- The Charlie Drake Show
- Chewin' the Fat
- Come Fly with Me
- Comedy Nation
- The Comic Side of 7 Days
- The Complete and Utter History of Britain
- Cool It
- Copy Cats

=== D ===
- The Day Today
- Dead Ringers
- The Dick Emery Show
- Do Not Adjust Your Set
- Dogface
- Drake's Progress

=== E ===
- End of Part One

=== F ===
- Famalam
- The Fast Show
- Fist of Fun
- Fool Britannia
- Frankie Boyle's Tramadol Nights
- French and Saunders
- The Frost Report

=== G ===
- Goodbye Again
- Goodness Gracious Me

=== H ===
- Hale and Pace
- Harry & Paul
- Harry Enfield & Chums
- Harry Enfield's Brand Spanking New Show
- Harry Hill's TV Burp
- Headcases
- Hello Cheeky (radio and television)
- High Spirits with Shirley Ghostman
- The History of the World Backwards
- Horne & Corden
- Horrible Histories (2009)
- Horrible Histories (2015)

=== I ===
- The Illustrated Weekly Hudd
- The Imaginatively-Titled Punt & Dennis Show
- The Impressions Show with Culshaw and Stephenson
- Inside Victor Lewis-Smith
- Is It Bill Bailey?
- It's a Square World
- It's Kevin
- It's Marty

=== J ===
- Jam
- Jeff Global's Global Probe
- Julie Walters and Friends
- Just for Laughs

=== K ===
- The Karen Dunbar Show
- Katy Brand's Big Ass Show
- The Keith & Paddy Picture Show
- The Keith Lemon Sketch Show
- The Kenny Everett Video Show
- The Kenny Everett Television Show
- The Kevin Bishop Show
- A Kick Up the Eighties
- Kookyville
- KYTV

=== L ===
- La La Land
- Laugh??? I Nearly Paid My Licence Fee
- The Laughter Show
- Lenny Henry in Pieces
- The Lenny Henry Show
- The League of Gentlemen
- Lee Nelson's Well Funny People
- Lee Nelson's Well Good Show
- Limmy's Show
- The Little and Large Show
- Little Britain
- Little Miss Jocelyn

=== M ===
- Man Stroke Woman
- Marc Wootton Exposed
- Marty
- The Marty Feldman Comedy Machine
- The Mary Whitehouse Experience
- Mash and Peas
- The Message
- The Mitchell and Webb Situation
- Modern Toss
- Monkey Dust
- Monkey Trousers
- Monty Python's Flying Circus
- Morecambe & Wise
- The Morgana Show

=== N ===
- Naked Video
- Newman and Baddiel in Pieces
- Newzoids
- No Signal!
- Noel Fielding's Luxury Comedy
- Not Only... But Also
- Not the Nine O'Clock News

=== O ===
- On the Margin
- The One...
- O.T.T.

=== P ===
- Paul Merton: The Series
- The Peter Serafinowicz Show
- Psychobitches

=== Q ===
- Q...

=== R ===
- The Real McCoy
- The Revolution Will Be Televised
- Ronni Ancona & Co
- Running Wild
- Rush Hour
- The Russ Abbot Show
- Rutland Weekend Television

=== S ===
- The Saturday Night Armistice
- Saturday Stayback
- Scallywagga
- School of Comedy
- Scotch and Wry
- Set of Six
- Sez Les
- The Sketch Show
- A Show Called Fred
- Slapstick and Old Lace
- Smack the Pony
- The Smell of Reeves and Mortimer
- Son of Fred
- Sorry, I've Got No Head
- Spitting Image (1984)
- Spitting Image (2020)
- Spoons
- The Stanley Baxter Show
- Star Stories
- The Summer Show

=== T ===
- That Mitchell and Webb Look
- That Was the Week That Was
- This Morning with Richard Not Judy
- Three of a Kind
- Time Trumpet
- Tittybangbang
- Tonightly
- The Tony Hancock Show
- Touch Me, I'm Karen Taylor
- Tracey Breaks the News
- Tracey Ullman's Show
- Trigger Happy TV
- Twice a Fortnight
- Two Of A Kind
- The Two Ronnies

=== U ===
- Unnatural Acts
- Up Sunday

=== V ===
- Very Important People
- Vic Reeves Big Night Out
- Victoria Wood as Seen on TV

=== W ===
- Walk on the Wild Side
- Walliams & Friend
- Watson & Oliver
- Whatever I Want
- Where Was Spring?
- Who Dares Wins
- Wood and Walters
- World Shut Your Mouth
- The Wrong Door

=== Y ===
- You Cannot Be Serious!

== United States ==
=== # ===
- The ½ Hour News Hour
- The (206)
- 50 Central

=== A ===
- The ABC Comedy Hour
- Acceptable.TV
- Adam Ruins Everything
- ADHD Shorts
- The Adventures of Digger and Friends
- Al TV
- The Alan Young Show
- All That
- Almost Live!
- Alternatino with Arturo Castro
- The Amanda Show
- The Amber Ruffin Show
- The American Music Show
- The Andy Dick Show
- The Andy Milonakis Show
- Animaniacs (1993)
- Animaniacs (2020)
- Apartment 2F
- The Apollo Comedy Hour
- The Aquabats! Super Show!
- Assaulted Nuts
- Astronomy Club: The Sketch Show
- At Home with Amy Sedaris
- Atom TV
- Aunty Donna's Big Ol' House of Fun
- AwesomenessTV

=== B ===
- The B.S. of A. with Brian Sack
- The Banana Splits
- Barbara Mandrell & the Mandrell Sisters
- Beakman's World
- The Ben Show
- The Ben Stiller Show
- Best Week Ever
- Between the Lions
- Beyond Our Control
- Big Bag
- Big Chuck and Lil' John
- The Big Gay Sketch Show
- Bill Nye the Science Guy
- The Birthday Boys
- Biz Kids
- A Black Lady Sketch Show
- Blue Collar TV
- Brad Neely's Harg Nallin' Sclopio Peepio
- Braingames
- The Brady Bunch Hour
- Bunk
- Bunnytown
- The Buster Keaton Show

=== C ===
- Caesar's Hour
- Cake
- Camp Midnite
- The Candy Apple News Company
- Carol Burnett & Company
- The Carol Burnett Show
- Cartoon Planet
- Cedric the Entertainer Presents
- Chappelle's Show
- Charley Weaver's Hobby Lobby
- Cheap Seats
- Check It Out! with Dr. Steve Brule
- The Chelsea Handler Show
- Chelsea Lately
- Cher
- Chocolate News
- The Chris Rock Show
- The CollegeHumor Show
- The Comedians
- Comedy Bang! Bang!
- Conan
- Cos
- Crank Yankers
- Curiosity Shop

=== D ===
- The Dana Carvey Show
- The Danny Kaye Show
- The Dean Martin Comedy World
- The Dean Martin Show
- Deon Cole's Black Box
- The Dish
- Dogg After Dark
- Doggy Fizzle Televizzle
- Dolly
- The Don Ho Show
- The Don Knotts Show
- Donny & Marie
- Don't Just Sit There!
- Don't Look Now
- The Downer Channel
- Drew Carey's Improv-A-Ganza
- Drunk History

=== E ===
- The Edge
- The Electric Company (1971)
- The Electric Company (2009)
- The Entertainers
- The Ernie Kovacs Show
- The Eric Andre Show
- Exit 57

=== F ===
- Fire by Nite
- The Flip Wilson Show
- The Floppy Show
- Frank TV
- Friday Night Videos
- Fridays
- Friends of the People
- Funny or Die Presents
- The Funny Side

=== G ===
- G4's Late Night Peepshow
- Garfunkel and Oates
- The Garry Moore Show
- The Great American Dream Machine
- Green Screen Adventures
- Guys Next Door

=== H ===
- Hack My Life
- The Hanna-Barbera Happy Hour
- The Harlem Globetrotters Popcorn Machine
- Haywire
- Hee Haw
- Hell Den
- Hey Girl
- Hey Vern, It's Ernest!
- Hi Octane
- Histeria!
- History of the World, Part II
- Hot Date
- Hot Fudge
- Hot Package
- Hot Seat
- House of Buggin'
- Howie
- Human Giant
- Hype

=== I ===
- I Think You Should Leave with Tim Robinson
- The Idiot Box
- The Iliza Shlesinger Sketch Show
- Important Things with Demetri Martin
- In Living Color
- In the Flow with Affion Crockett
- Incredible Crew
- InfoMania
- Inside Amy Schumer

=== J ===
- The Jackie Gleason Show
- The Jacksons
- Jake and Amir
- The Jamie Kennedy Experiment
- The Jay Leno Show
- The Jeff Dunham Show
- Jeffery & Cole Casserole
- The Jenny McCarthy Show
- The Jerry Lewis Show
- The Jimmy Dean Show
- Jimmy Durante Presents the Lennon Sisters
- John Mulaney Presents: Everybody's in LA
- Jokebook
- Jon Benjamin Has a Van
- The Jonathan Winters Show
- Joya's Fun School
- Just for Laughs
- Just Say Julie

=== K ===
- KaBlam!
- Key & Peele
- The Kids Tonight Show
- King Koopa's Kool Kartoons
- The Krofft Superstar Hour
- Kroll Show

=== L ===
- Laff Mobb's Laff Tracks
- The Lance Krall Show
- The Late Late Show
- Late Night
- The Late Show
- Late World with Zach
- Laughs For Sale
- The Leslie Uggams Show
- Let's Be Real
- Like, Share, Die
- Little Britain USA
- A Little Late with Lilly Singh
- Live on Tape
- Loiter Squad
- Lopez Tonight
- The Lyricist Lounge Show

=== M ===
- Mad
- Mad Movies with the L.A. Connection
- Mad TV
- The Man Show
- Marie
- Mary
- The Mary Tyler Moore Hour
- Maya & Marty
- The Me and You Show
- Mega64
- Michael & Michael Have Issues
- The Mickey Mouse Club
- Mickey Mouse Works
- Mind of Mencia
- Million Dollar Extreme Presents: World Peace
- The Monte Carlo Show
- Mostly 4 Millennials
- Mr. Show with Bob and David
- The Muppet Show
- Muppets Tonight
- Mystery Science Theater 3000

=== N ===
- Nate on Drums
- Netflix Presents: The Characters
- The New Show
- The New Bill Cosby Show
- The Newz
- The Nick Cannon Show
- Nick Jr. Face
- Nick Swardson's Pretend Time
- No Soap, Radio
- NonProductive
- Not Necessarily the News
- The Not-Too-Late Show with Elmo
- The Now and Then Show

=== O ===
- Okay, Mother
- On the Spot
- On the Television
- Onion News Network
- Out of Control

=== P ===
- Party Over Here
- Pat Paulsen's Half a Comedy Hour
- Pause with Sam Jay
- The Pete Holmes Show
- Pink Lady
- Pinwheel
- Pirate TV
- The Plucky Duck Show
- Pop! Goes the Country
- Popeye Theater with Mister Mac
- Popzilla
- Portlandia
- Pranked
- Pulp Comics

=== R ===
- Random Acts of Flyness
- Random! Cartoons
- The Red Skelton Show
- The Rerun Show
- The Richard Pryor Show
- Right Now Kapow
- Riot
- Robot Chicken
- The Roseanne Show
- Roundhouse
- Rowan & Martin's Laugh-In
- The Rundown with Robin Thede
- The RuPaul Show

=== S ===
- Sam and Friends
- Saturday Morning All Star Hits!
- Saturday Night Dead
- Saturday Night Live
- Saturday Night Live Weekend Update Thursday
- Saturday Night Live with Howard Cosell
- Saturday Night Special
- The Scott and Gary Show
- SeeMore's Playhouse
- Sesame Street
- Seth MacFarlane's Cavalcade of Cartoon Comedy
- Sha Na Na
- She's Living for This
- Sherman's Showcase
- The Shivering Truth
- Short Ribbs
- The Showbiz Show with David Spade
- Sid the Science Kid
- The Sifl and Olly Show
- Six Degrees of Everything
- Sketchy Queens
- The Smothers Brothers Comedy Hour
- Smosh
- So Random!
- The Sonny & Cher Comedy Hour
- Sonny with a Chance
- The Soup
- The Soup Investigates
- Sports Bar
- Sports Show with Norm Macdonald
- Sports Soup
- Stand Up and Cheer
- Stankervision
- The State
- Steampipe Alley
- Stella
- The Steve Allen Show
- Steve Harvey's Big Time Challenge
- Stevie TV
- Studio C
- Sugar and Toys
- Super Dave
- SuperNews!
- Svengoolie

=== T ===
- Television Parts
- Thank God You're Here
- That Damn Michael Che
- Tim and Eric Awesome Show, Great Job!
- The Tim Conway Comedy Hour
- The Tim Conway Show
- Tiny Toon Adventures
- The Tonight Show
- Tony Orlando and Dawn
- The Tony Rock Project
- Too Late with Adam Carolla
- Toon In with Me
- Total Panic
- Totally Hidden Video
- Townsend Television
- Tracey Takes On...
- The Tracey Ullman Show
- Tracey Ullman's State of the Union
- TripTank
- Trust Us with Your Life
- Tumbleweed Theater
- Tush
- TV Funhouse
- Two More Eggs

=== U ===
- Uncle Croc's Block
- The Underground
- Up Late NW
- Upright Citizens Brigade
- Uptown Comedy Club
- USA Up All Night

=== V ===
- Van Dyke and Company
- The VeggieTales Show
- VH1 ILL-ustrated
- Viva Variety

=== W ===
- W/ Bob & David
- Wacko
- Wake, Rattle, and Roll
- Web Soup
- Weekends at the D.L.
- Weinerville
- The Weird Al Show
- Welcome Freshman
- The Whitest Kids U' Know
- Who Gets the Last Laugh?
- The Who Was? Show
- Whose Line Is It Anyway?
- Why? with Hannibal Buress
- Wild 'n Out
- Wonder Showzen

=== Y ===
- You Wrote It, You Watch It
- Your Show of Shows

=== Z ===
- Ziwe

== Uruguay ==
- El show del mediodía
- Decalegrón
- Telecataplúm

== Co-productions ==
- Aaagh! It's the Mr. Hell Show!
- Bubble Guppies
- Crashbox
- Horrible Histories (2000)
- The Mr. Men Show (1997)
- The Mr. Men Show (2008)
- Ni Ni's Treehouse
- Planet Sketch
- Skinnamarink TV
- Sponk!
- Starveillance
- The Tom Green Show
- The Wrong Coast
- Yo Gabba Gabba!
- Zoboomafoo

== See also ==
- List of comedy television series
- List of sketch comedy groups
