= Sketch comedy =

Series of short comedy scenes or vigente

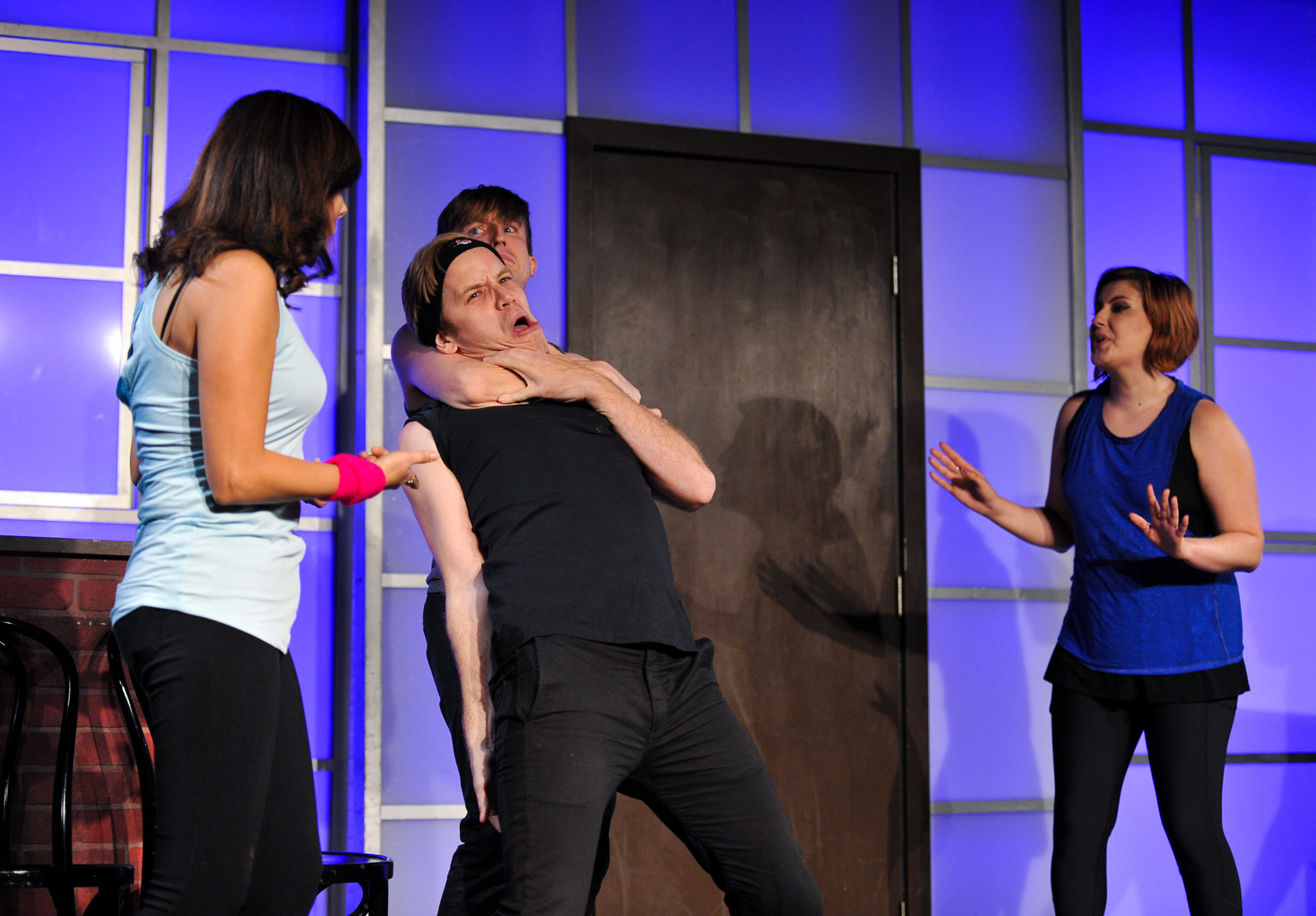
Sketch comedy actors of Nightmare on Overwhelmed Street in 2018

Sketch comedy comprises a series of short, amusing scenes or vignettes, called "sketches" or "skits", commonly between one and ten minutes long, performed by a group of comic actors or comedians. While the form developed and became popular in music hall in Britain and vaudeville in North America, today it is used widely in variety shows, as well as in late night talk shows and even some sitcoms. While sketch comedy is now associated mostly with adult entertainment, certain children's television series have used it, too. The sketches may be improvised live by the performers, developed through improvisation before public performance, or scripted and rehearsed in advance like a play.

== History ==
Sketch comedy has its origins in music hall and vaudeville, where many brief humorous acts were strung together to form a larger programme. In the 1890s, music hall impresario Fred Karno developed a form of sketch comedy without dialogue, and in 1904 he produced a sketch called Mumming Birds for the Hackney Empire in London, which included the pie in the face gag among other innovations. His troupe, advertised as "Fred Karno's London Comedians", included Charlie Chaplin and Stan Laurel.

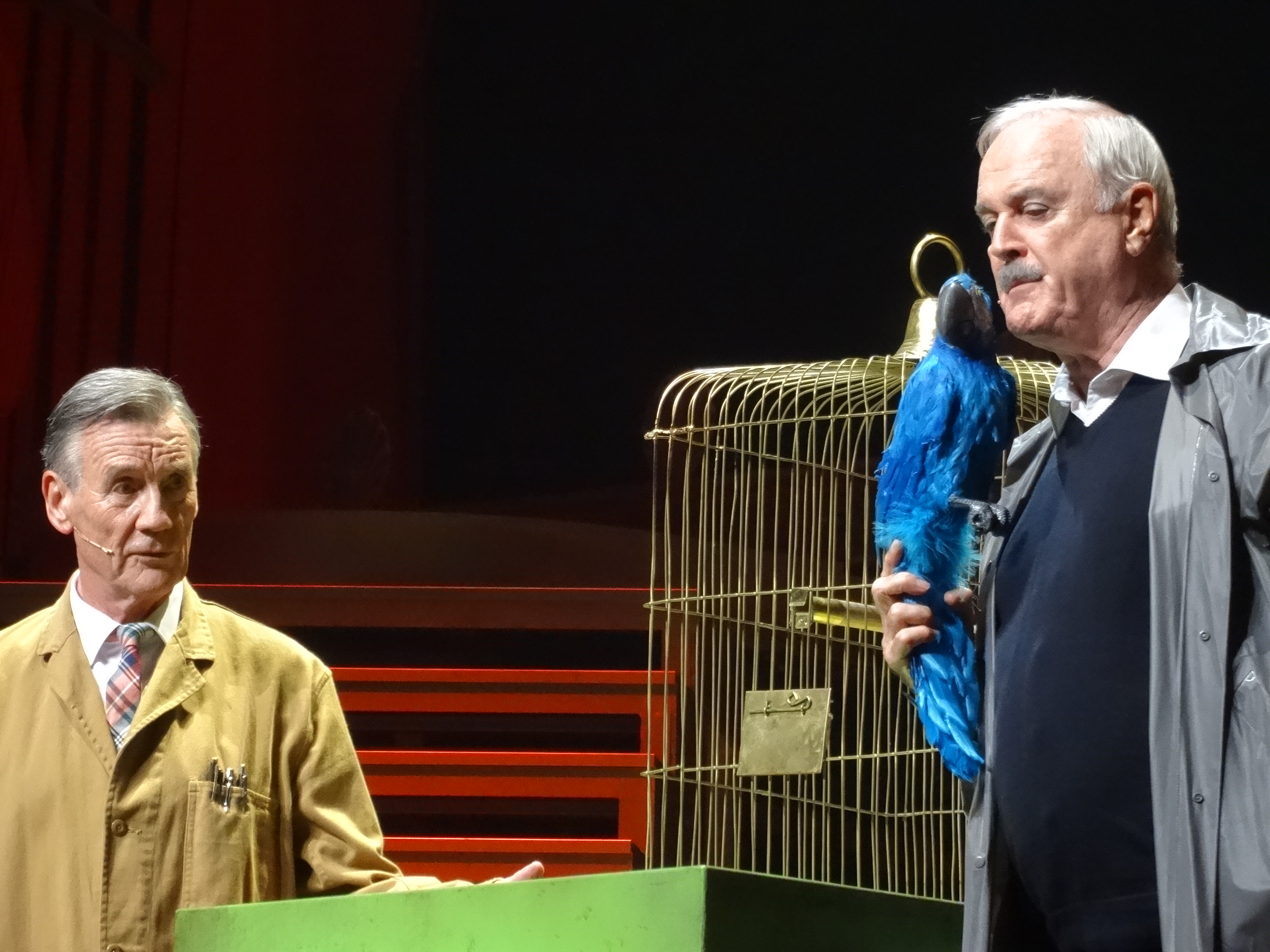
John Cleese (right) and Michael Palin of Monty Python recreating the "Dead Parrot sketch" (aired in 1969) in 2014

In Britain, it moved to stage performances by Cambridge Footlights, such as Beyond the Fringe and A Clump of Plinths (which evolved into Cambridge Circus), to radio, with such shows as It's That Man Again and I'm Sorry, I'll Read That Again, then to television, with such shows as The Benny Hill Show, Not Only... But Also, Monty Python's Flying Circus, The Two Ronnies, Not the Nine O'Clock News (and its successor Alas Smith and Jones), and A Bit of Fry and Laurie. Making his television debut in 1949, Benny Hill, who developed his parodic sketches on BBC variety shows before having his own show in 1955, was described as "a comic genius steeped in the British music hall tradition". Charles Isherwood writes that Monty Python, like Benny Hill, "derived their sketch formats in part from the rowdy tradition of the music hall."

An early, perhaps the first, televised example of a sketch comedy show is Texaco Star Theater aka The Milton Berle Show 1948–1967, hosted by Milton Berle. In Mexico, the series Los Supergenios de la Mesa Cuadrada, created by Mexican comedian Roberto Gómez Bolaños under the stage name Chespirito, was broadcast between 1968 and 1973, creating such famous characters as El Chavo del Ocho and El Chapulín Colorado.

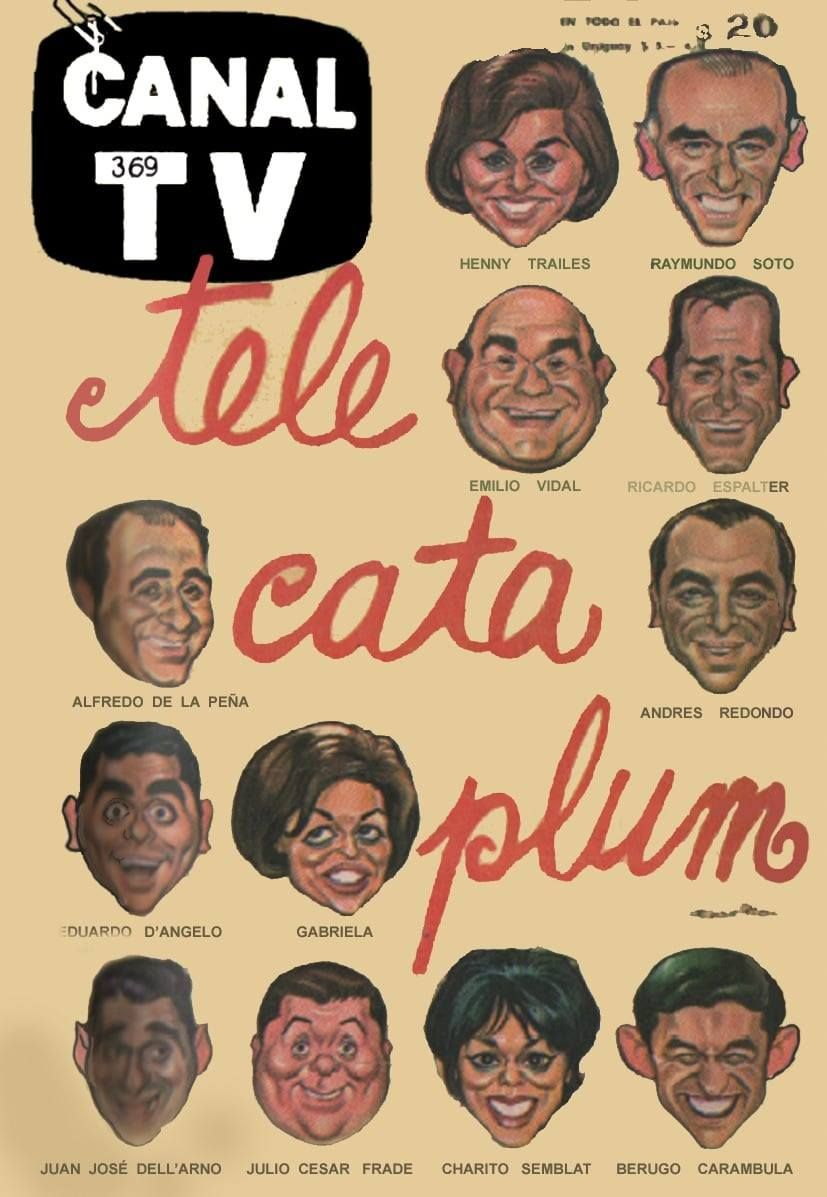
Title screen of Telecataplúm

In Uruguay, the television program Telecataplúm premiered in 1962 on Teledoce and aired successfully until 1969, returning later from 1977 to 2001. The cast included, among others, Ricardo Espalter, Eduardo D'Angelo, Raimundo Soto, Henny Trayles, and Gabriela Acher, who gained widespread popularity not only in Uruguay but also in Argentina and Chile, where the same actors produced similar programs for the local audience. Among its most emblematic sketches was Noticias Cantadas (Spanish for 'Sung News'), which became a hallmark of televised humor in the Río de la Plata region.

From 1978 to 2001, Uruguay’s Canal 10 also broadcast the show Decalegrón, which achieved high audience ratings and featured several of the original cast members from Telecataplúm. Among its most renowned sketches was Espalter’s “Pinchinatti” in 1989, in which he portrayed a fictional presidential candidate with absurd and satirical populist proposals. The sketch became extremely popular, prompting rallies that closely resembled real political campaigns, with large crowds carrying banners, posters, and flags, along with campaign-style propaganda and jingles—although these events were entirely theatrical and not in support of a real candidate.

While separate sketches historically have tended to be unrelated, more recent groups have introduced overarching themes that connect the sketches within a particular show with recurring characters that return for more than one appearance. Examples of recurring characters include Mr. Gumby from Monty Python's Flying Circus; Ted and Ralph from The Fast Show; The Family from The Carol Burnett Show; the Head Crusher from The Kids in the Hall; Martin Short's Ed Grimley, a recurring character from both SCTV and Saturday Night Live; The Nerd from Robot Chicken; and Kevin and Perry from Harry Enfield and Chums. Recurring characters from Saturday Night Live have notably been featured in a number of spinoff films, including The Blues Brothers (1980), Wayne's World (1992) and Superstar (1999).

The idea of running characters was taken a step further with shows like The Red Green Show and The League of Gentlemen, where sketches centered on the various inhabitants of the fictional towns of Possum Lake and Royston Vasey, respectively. In Little Britain, sketches focused on a cast of recurring characters.

In North America, contemporary sketch comedy is largely an outgrowth of the improvisational comedy scene that flourished during the 1970s, largely growing out of The Second City in Chicago and Toronto, which was built upon the success in Minneapolis of The Brave New Workshop and Dudley Riggs.

Notable contemporary American stage sketch comedy groups include The Second City, the Upright Citizens Brigade, and The Groundlings. In South Bend, Indiana, area high school students produced a sketch comedy series called Beyond Our Control that aired on the local NBC affiliate WNDU-TV from 1967 to 1986. Warner Bros. Animation made two sketch comedy shows, Mad and Right Now Kapow.

Australian television of the 1980s and 1990s featured several successful sketch comedy shows, notably The Comedy Company, whose recurring characters included Col'n Carpenter, Kylie Mole and Con the Fruiterer.

=== Films ===
An early British example is the influential The Running Jumping & Standing Still Film (1959). Sketch films made during the 1970s and 1980s include If You Don't Stop It... You'll Go Blind and the sequel Can I Do It... 'Til I Need Glasses?, The Groove Tube, Everything You Always Wanted to Know About Sex* (*But Were Afraid to Ask), The Kentucky Fried Movie and Amazon Women on the Moon, and Monty Python's And Now for Something Completely Different and The Meaning of Life.

More recent sketch films include The Underground Comedy Movie, InAPPropriate Comedy, Movie 43 and Livrés chez vous sans contact.

=== Festivals ===
Many of the sketch comedy revues in Britain included seasons at the Edinburgh Fringe Festival.

Since 1999, the growing sketch comedy scene has precipitated the development of sketch comedy festivals in cities all around North America. Noted festivals include:

- Chicago Sketch Fest
- SF Sketchfest
- Toronto Sketch Comedy Festival

== See also ==
- Brave New Workshop
- British Comedy Awards
- List of recurring Saturday Night Live characters and sketches
- List of sketch comedy groups
- List of sketch comedy television series
- Nininbaori
- Saturday Night Live TV show sketches
