= The Unbreakables =

1975 film

Los irrompibles
- Directed by: Emilio Vieyra
- Written by: Emilio Vieyra; Antonio Rosso
- Produced by: Fernando Molina
- Starring: Jorge Martínez; Ricardo Espalter; Graciela Alfano; Roberto Escalada; Rolando Dumas; Santiago Gómez Cou; Betiana Blum; Enrique Almada; Eduardo D'Angelo; Berugo Carámbula; Andrés Redondo
- Cinematography: Nort Films (Argentina)
- Music by: Luis María Serra; Emilio Vieyra
- Distributed by: Nort Films (Argentina)
- Release date: 1975
- Running time: 85 minutes
- Country: Argentina
- Language: Spanish

The Unbreakables (Los irrompibles) is a 1975 Argentine Western film.

== Plot ==
Harry "El Caliente" and Billy "El Frío" (Jorge Martínez and Ricardo Espalter) are two successful detectives, hired directly from the United States to solve a series of gold robberies from coaches owned by the Argentine Gold Mining Company. They are "Spaghetti Western" type cowboys, who are helped by four mysterious riders dressed in white overcoats and white hats (played by Enrique Almada, Eduardo D'Angelo, Andrés Redondo and Berugo Carámbula). The four riders always appear just to help the two detectives, in the role of "guardian angels".

== Cast ==
- Jorge Martínez as Harry "El Caliente"
- Ricardo Espalter as Billy "El Frío"
- Graciela Alfano
- Roberto Escalada
- Rolando Dumas
- Santiago Gómez Cou
- Betiana Blum
- Enrique Almada
- Eduardo D'Angelo
- Berugo Carámbula
- Andrés Redondo
