= En el nombre del hijo =

- Directed by: Jorge Polaco
- Written by: Jorge Polaco
- Produced by: Sabina Sigler
- Starring: Margot Moreyra; Ariel Bonomi
- Cinematography: Esteban Courtalon
- Edited by: Marcela Sáenz
- Release date: 1 October 1987
- Running time: 90 minutes
- Country: Argentina
- Language: Spanish

En el nombre del hijo ("In the Name of the Son") is a 1987 Argentine drama film written and directed by Jorge Polaco. It won a Golden Dolphin in the 1988 Festróia - Tróia International Film Festival.

== Plot summary ==
The story is about the unhealthy relationship between a castrating mother and her homosexual son, Bobby, who is a doll repairman. They have an incestuous relationship, bathing together, sleeping together, and having sexual relations. Bobby's mother is possessive and jealous of his suggestive relationship with his clients, mostly girls. The story portrays Bobby as a man confused about his sexual identity, while his overprotective mother abuses him and seeks to relive the days of her youth.

== Cast ==
- Margot Moreyra as Madre
- Ariel Bonomi as Bobby
- Fernando Madanes
- Goly Bernal
- Sergio Lerer
- Jorge Sabaté
- Graciela Taquini
- Alí Bargach
- Ana Estrada
- Berenice Soto
- María Angélica Villar
- John Bolster
- Natalia Zamara
- Marina Cabrera
- María Celeste Dalairac
- Alicia Muxo

== Reception ==
César Magrini in El Cronista Comercial said: "Formidable aesthetic language... Margot Moreyra and Ariel Bonomi, and you have to see them to understand them, are capable of doing what they do because when they act, they strip themselves of their fears, and it is known that from this counterpoint only injuries, sores, and wounds are produced, which are hardly curable."

Carlos Troncone in Página 12 wrote: "Repression, among flowers of evil... In truth - suggests the film - there are no absolute monsters just as there are no beings who are absolutely normal. Religion and morality, education, economics, and surely politics shape deformed creatures whose virtues and flaws can lose their proportions and alternate depending on whether the context is public or private."

Manrupe and Portela write: "The best example of Polaco's grotesque cinema, with a kitsch and rough aesthetic, and a different way of approaching the mother-son relationship."
