= Kindergarten (1989 film) =

- Directed by: Jorge Polaco
- Written by: Daniel González Valdueña; Jorge Polaco
- Based on: Kindergarten by Asher Benatar
- Produced by: Víctor Bó; Salvador D'Antonio; Carlos Mentasti
- Starring: Graciela Borges; Arturo Puig; Luisa Vehil
- Cinematography: Esteban Courtalon
- Edited by: Oscar Gómez
- Music by: Héctor Magni
- Production company: Argentina Sono Film S.A.C.I.
- Distributed by: Argentina Sono Film S.A.C.I.
- Release date: 1989
- Running time: 90 minutes
- Country: Argentina
- Language: Spanish

Kindergarten is a 1989 Argentine drama film co-written and directed by Jorge Polaco, based on Asher Benatar's novel of the same name. It stars Graciela Borges, Arturo Puig and Luisa Vehil. It was banned from theaters one day short of its release, and remained unreleased in Argentina until 2010, when a restored copy premiered in Mar del Plata Film Festival.

== Plot summary ==
The movie focuses on the marriage of Graciela and Arturo, who operate a kindergarten in their mansion. They live with Graciela's widowed mother, Luisa. Graciela is particularly keen on one boy, Luciano, on whom she makes sexual advances. As time progresses, the relationship between Graciela and Arturo tenses. Scenes show them celebrating kids' birthdays while having sex in hiding, practicing a ritualistic burning of a wrecked car, mistreating their comatose grandfather (victim of said car wreck) and generally torturing Luciano. The end has Luciano imprisoning and gassing Graciela and Arturo, and then escaping with Luisa on a horse-drawn carriage.

== Cast ==
- Graciela Borges ... Graciela
- Arturo Puig ... Arturo
- Luisa Vehil ... Grandmother
- Elvira Romei ... Elvira
- Luciano Sanguineri ... Luciano
- Cecilia Etchegaray ... Silvia
- Alejandro Urdapilleta ... Popcorn Seller
- Eithel Bianco
- Margot Moreyra
- Eleonora Berlante
- Micaela Brandoni
- Néstor Tirri

== Controversy and release ==
The film sparked controversy due to its perceived mistreatment of child actors (the protagonist, an eleven-year-old, spends most of his screen-time naked), as well as a number of censored scenes: an adult woman and a child take a bath together, the same woman later on makes suggestive advances on the child, plus the inclusion of an apparently unrelated, explicit and unsimulated oral sex scene performed by Cecilia Etchegaray to Arturo Puig.

The movie was banned from theaters one day short of release and a prolonged trial ensued over eight years, emotionally devastating Polaco and his fellow workmen. It has gained notoriety as being the first—and only—film censored by a democratic government since the end of Argentina's last military dictatorship in 1983.

Polaco lobbied for many years for a release of Kindergarten in public theaters. Finally, a restored copy of the film was released on the 2010 Mar del Plata Film Festival for the first time since its shooting over 20 years before.
