= List of sketch comedy groups =

The following is a list of notable sketch comedy groups, sorted by country.

== Australia ==
- Aunty Donna
- The Chaser
- The Janoskians

== Belgium ==
- Neveneffecten

== Brazil ==
- Casseta & Planeta
- Hermes & Renato
- Os Trapalhões
- Porta dos Fundos

== Canada ==
- The Bobroom
- CODCO
- The Frantics
- Hot Thespian Action
- The Kids in the Hall
- LoadingReadyRun
- The Minnesota Wrecking Crew
- Picnicface
- Red Green
- Rock et Belles Oreilles
- Royal Canadian Air Farce
- The Ryan and Amy Show
- The Sketchersons
- Three Dead Trolls in a Baggie
- Truthhorse
- Wayne and Shuster
- The Vacant Lot

== Estonia ==
- Kreisiraadio

== Finland ==
- Kummeli
- Studio Julmahuvi

== France ==
- Les Inconnus

== India ==
- All India Bakchod
- East India Comedy
- Jordindian

== Republic of Ireland ==
- Foil Arms and Hog

== Portugal ==
- Gato Fedorento

== Japan ==
- Downtown (Dauntaun in Katakana)

== United Kingdom ==
- Armstrong and Miller
- Cambridge Circus
- The Cambridge Footlights
- The Consultants
- Derek and Clive
- Hale and Pace
- The Hollow Men
- Idiots of Ants
- Not the Nine O'Clock News
- Monty Python
- Morecambe and Wise
- Pappy's
- Pete and Dud
- Mitchell and Webb
- Studio E
- The Mighty Boosh
- The Penny Dreadfuls
- The Two Ronnies

== United States ==
- Asperger's Are Us
- Barats and Bereta
- Derrick Comedy
- Duck's Breath Mystery Theatre
- The Firesign Theatre
- The Groundlings
- Harvard Sailing Team
- Mega64
- Million Dollar Extreme
- The Misplaced Comedy Group
- Olde English
- Second Nature Improv
- Stella
- Smosh
- Studio C
- The Lonely Island
- The Midnight Show
- The Second City
- The State
- The Tenderloins
- The Whitest Kids U' Know
- Under the Gun Theater
- Upright Citizens Brigade

== See also ==
- List of sketch comedy television series
