= Jorge Polaco =

Argentine film director (1946-2014)

- Born: 20 November 1946; Buenos Aires, Argentina
- Died: 20 February 2014 (aged 67); Buenos Aires, Argentina
- Occupation: Filmmaker
- Years active: 1984–2014
- Known for: En el nombre del hijo Kindergarten; Siempre es difícil volver a casa La dama regresa

Jorge Polaco (20 November 1946 – 20 February 2014) was an Argentine film director and screenwriter. His 1987 film En el nombre del hijo won Best Film at the 1988 Festroia International Film Festival in Setúbal, Portugal.

== Career ==
In 1983, Polaco worked as assistant director and starred in the independent film From the Faces of the Mirror, directed by Pablo César. After directing the short film Margotita (1984) Polaco made his feature film debut with Diapasón (1986), a modern retelling of the Pygmalion myth. It was followed by En el nombre del hijo (1987), a film about a disturbed doll restorer and his possessive mother, for which he won a Golden Dolphin at the Festróia – Tróia International Film Festival in Setubal, Portugal, in 1988. All of his early films star fetish actress Margot Moreyra as the character Margotita.

In 1989 Polaco made his most famous and controversial film, Kindergarten, starring Graciela Borges, Arturo Puig and Luisa Vehil. The film sparked controversy due to its alleged mistreatment of child actors (the protagonist, an eleven-year-old, spends most of his screen-time naked), as well as a number of censored scenes: an adult woman and a child take a bath together, the same woman later on makes suggestive advances on the child, plus the inclusion of an unrelated, explicit oral sex scene. The movie was banned from theaters by the Justice one day short of release and a prolonged trial ensued over eight years, emotionally devastating Polaco and his fellow workers. The film remains unreleased in Argentina. It has gained notoriety as being the first film to be censored following the end of the military dictatorship in 1983.

Polaco remained active nonetheless, filming Siempre es difícil volver a casa (1992), his first major studio production, and La dama regresa (1996), which served as a comeback vehicle for retired actress Isabel Sarli.

Polaco retreated from directing for a period of time. 2001 saw his comeback, making the short film El milagro with famed ballet dancer Julio Bocca, contributing to the anthology film Historias de Argentina en vivo (amongst Adrián Caetano, Marcelo Piñeyro, Bruno Stagnaro and Vicentico) and directing another feature-length movie, Viaje por el cuerpo, for which he was nominated for Best Screenplay and Best Art Direction at the Argentinean Film Critics Association Awards, and won a Golden Apple at the New York LaCinemaFe.

After some time working on it, Polaco gave up on the project of a modern adaptation of Hermann Hesse's Siddhartha. In 2007 he made the short film A Berta Singerman. In 2009 he teamed once more with Isabel Sarli and made the feature film Arroz con leche. Polaco's Kindergarten was eventually released on the 2011 Mar del Plata Film Festival for the first time since its shooting over 20 years before.

He died on 20 February 2014 at the age of 67, from Parkinson's disease complications.

== Filmography ==
- 1984 – Margotita
- 1986 – Diapasón (Tuning Fork)
- 1987 – En el nombre del hijo (In the Name of the Son)
- 1989 – Kindergarten
- 1992 – Siempre es difícil volver a casa (It's Always Hard to Return Home)
- 1996 – La dama regresa (The Lady Returns)
- 2001 – El milagro (The Miracle)
- 2001 – Viaje por el cuerpo (Journey Across the Body)
- 2001 – Historias de Argentina en vivo (Live Stories from Argentina)
- 2007 – A Berta Singerman (For Berta Singerman)
- 2009 – Arroz con leche (Rice and Milk)
