= Festroia International Film Festival =

Former annual Portuguese film festival (1985–2014)

Coordinates: 38°31′27.5″N 8°53′33.4″W

Festróia – Tróia International Film Festival
- Location: Setúbal, Portugal
- Founded: 1985
- Disestablished: 2015
- Awards: Golden Dolphin
- Website: http://www.fipresci.org

The Tróia International Film Festival, commonly referred to as Festroia (Portuguese: Festival Internacional de Cinema de Tróia – Festróia), was an annual international film festival in Portugal held from 1985 to 2014.

Held in the town of Setúbal and named after the nearby Tróia Peninsula where the festival was originally based until 1993, the festival showcased mainly arthouse films made by smaller or less publicised national cinemas from around the world. In later editions its competitive section was open to films from countries producing less than 30 feature films per year. Usually held in the first week of June, the festival gave out a series of prizes, with the main award for Best Film being the Golden Dolphin (Golfinho de Ouro).

The last edition held was the 30th festival held in 2014. Due to cuts in funding, the 2015 edition was cancelled in March that year, three months before it was scheduled to take place, and a notification saying that there would be no 31st edition was put up on the official website in its last update. The website itself was taken down in early 2017.

== Golden Dolphin winners ==
Year	Film	Director	Country
1985 (1st)	Twenty Years Later	Eduardo Coutinho	Brazil
1986 (2nd)	Fool for Love	Robert Altman	United States
1987 (3rd)	Madrid	Basilio Martín Patino	Spain
1988 (4th)	In the Name of the Son	Jorge Polaco	Argentina
1989 (5th)	The Citadel	Mohamed Chouikh	Algeria
1990 (6th)	Rose of the Desert	Rachid Benhadj	Algeria
1991 (7th)	Homo Novus	Pál Erdöss	Hungary
1992 (8th)	One Full Moon	Endaf Emlyn	Wales
1993 (9th)	It's Better to Be Wealthy and Healthy Than Poor and Ill	Juraj Jakubisko	Czechoslovakia
1994 (10th)	The Sacred Mound	Hrafn Gunnlaugsson	Iceland
1995 (11th)	Madagascar	Fernando Pérez	Cuba
1996 (12th)	Cold Fever	Fridrik Thor Fridriksson	Iceland
1997 (13th)	The Father	Majid Majidi	Iran
1998 (14th)	The Bandit	Yavuz Turgul	Turkey
1999 (15th)	Solomon & Gaenor	Paul Morrison	Wales
2000 (16th)	Ambush	Olli Saarela	Finland
2001 (17th)	Italian for Beginners	Lone Scherfig	Denmark
2002 (18th)	Every Stewardess Goes to Heaven	Daniel Burman	Argentina
2003 (19th)	Intimate Stories	Carlos Sorín	Argentina
2004 (20th)	Bonjour Monsieur Shlomi	Shemi Zarhin	Israel
2005 (21st)	Turtles Can Fly	Bahman Ghobadi	Iran
2006 (22nd)	What a Wonderful Place	Eyal Halfon	Israel
2007 (23rd)	The Border Post	Rajko Grlić	Croatia
2008 (24th)	Empties	Jan Svěrák	Czech Republic
2009 (25th)	Forbidden Fruit	Dome Karukoski	Finland
2010 (26th)	A Somewhat Gentle Man	Hans Petter Moland	Norway
2011 (27th)	Tirza	Rudolf van den Berg	Netherlands
2012 (28th)	The Parade	Srđan Dragojević	Serbia
2013 (29th)	The Broken Circle Breakdown	Felix Van Groeningen	Belgium
2014 (30th)	The Priest's Children	Vinko Brešan	Croatia
