= The Vent! =

- Logo
- Genre: Comedy
- Country of origin: Canada
- Original language: English
- No. of seasons: 1
- No. of episodes: 6

Production
- Production locations: Toronto, Ontario
- Running time: 30 minutes

Original release
- Network: OUTtv
- Release: June 28, 2009 – present

The Vent! is a Canadian English language sketch comedy television series, produced by A Sweet Little Production Company. The series premiered on June 28, 2009 at 8:30 pm EST on Canadian digital cable specialty channel, OUTtv.

== Premise ==
The Vent! is a sketch comedy series developed for television, the Internet and mobile phones. The series revolves around one specific topic where 8 segments are created around that topic. The series was created, developed and starts Maggie Cassella and Charlie Smith
