= Eversmile, New Jersey =

- DVD cover
- Directed by: Carlos Sorín
- Written by: Carlos Sorín; Jorge Goldenberg; Roberto Scheuer
- Produced by: Oscar Kramer
- Starring: Daniel Day-Lewis; Mirjana Joković; Gabriela Acher; Ignacio Quirós
- Cinematography: Esteban Courtalon
- Edited by: Luis César D'Angiolillo; Bryan Oates
- Music by: Steve Levine
- Production companies: J&M Entertainment; Los Films Del Camino; Miramax
- Distributed by: J&M Entertainment
- Release date: 11 September 1989 (Canada)
- Running time: 91 minutes
- Countries: Argentina; United Kingdom
- Language: English

Eversmile, New Jersey (Spanish: Eterna sonrisa de New Jersey) is a 1989 Argentine-British comedy-drama film directed by Carlos Sorín and starring Daniel Day-Lewis, Mirjana Joković and Gabriela Acher. It was written by Sorín, Jorge Goldenberg and Roberto Scheuer. It premiered on September 11, 1989 at the Toronto International Film Festival in Canada.

== Plot summary ==
Fergus O'Connell, an itinerant Irish American dentist from New Jersey, offers his services free-of-charge to the isolated rural population of Patagonia, in Argentina. He's able to do so because of the supposedly no-strings sponsorship of a "dental consciousness" foundation. While his motorbike is being repaired, O'Connell meets Estela, the garage-owner's daughter, and they quickly become affectionate towards each other. Both lovers have prior commitment: he is married, and she is engaged. Yet, they go off together all the same. After a series of surrealistic adventures, O'Connell discovers that there's a subliminal price tag attached to his altruistic free services. Nevertheless, Fergus decides to continue with his work on the prevention of tooth decay and dental health education, simultaneously freeing himself from any kind of sponsorship and corporate meddling. He again proposes Estela to come join him, and they both depart, traveling on the road once again.

== Cast ==
- Daniel Day-Lewis as Dr. Fergus O'Connell
- Mirjana Joković as Estela
- Gabriela Acher as Celeste
- Julio De Grazia as Dr. Ulises Calvo
- Ignacio Quirós as The 'Boss'
- Boy Olmi as Radio Announcer
- Eduardo D'Angelo as Manager
- Alberto Benegas as Sheriff
- Roberto Catarineu as López
- Miguel Dedovich as Brother Conrad
- Miguel Ligero as Brother Felix
- José María Rivara as Gangster
- Vando Villamil as Gangster
- Alejandro Escudero as Brother Segundo
- Rubén Patagonia as Butler

== Awards ==
Wins

- Donostia-San Sebastián International Film Festival: Prize San Sebastián; Best Actress, Mirjana Jokovic; 1989.

== Home media ==
Eversmile New Jersey was released on DVD in Australia by Flashback Entertainment No. 26804.
