= Gabriela Acher =

Uruguayan actress and comedian (born 1944)

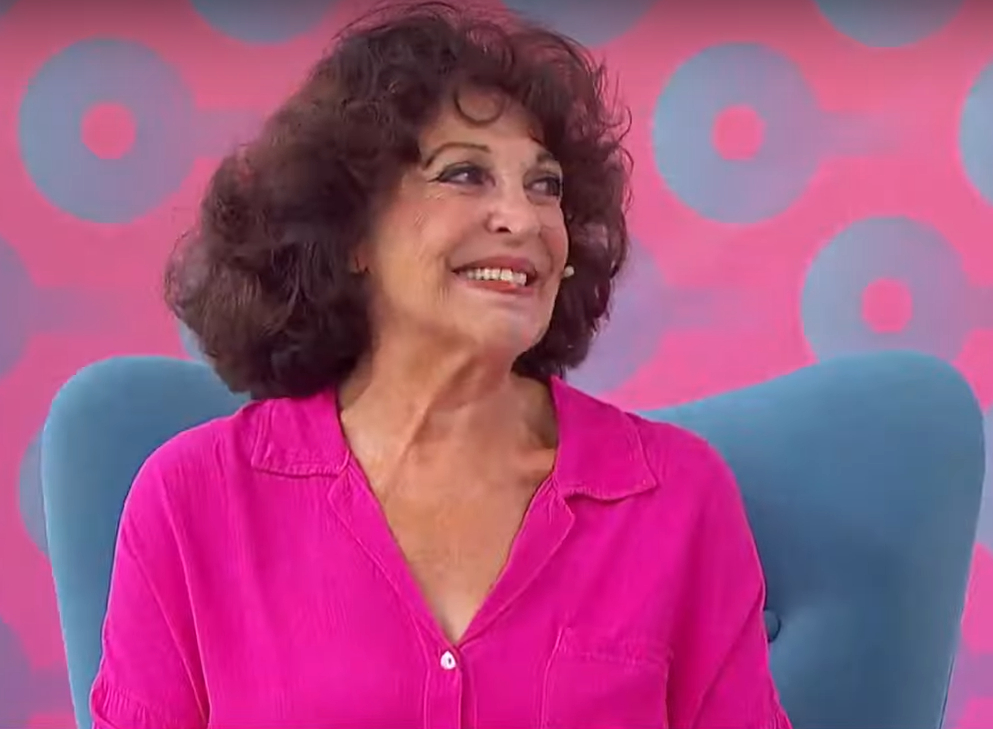
Image of Gabriela Acher

Gabriela Acher (born 5 August 1944 in Montevideo) is a Uruguayan actress and comedian, active in Argentina.

== Biography ==
Acher was born in Montevideo to a Sephardic family originary from Turkey. She started her career alongside the comedians Ricardo Espalter, Enrique Almada and Eduardo D'Angelo, appearing on television programs such as Telecataplúm and Hupumorpo. Soon she developed her own characters, notably "Chochy la dicharachera", which typically used "ch" in every possible word or phrase.

== Television ==
- 1963: Telecataplúm (humour): various characters.
- La tuerca (humour): various characters.
- 1969: Muchacha italiana viene a casarse (telenovela): Amalia.
- 1969: Jaujarana (humour): various characters.
- 1974-1975-1976-1977: Hupumorpo (humour): various characters.
- 1976: Mi cuñado (humour): various characters.
- 1980: Dos y Bartolo (humour).
- 1979-1980-1981: Comicolor (humour): various characters: «Chochi, la dicharachera», vedette «Lorena del Valle», imitations of Raffaella Carrá, Liza Minnelli, Donna Summer, Mina, etc.
- 1986: Los Retratos de Andrés.
- 1989-1990 Tato Diet (humour, with Tato Bores).
- 1991: Hagamos el humor (humour) Martín Fierro Award 1992.
- 1991: Juana y sus hermanas (humour, with Juana Molina): various characters.
- 1998: Gasoleros (telenovela).

== Filmography ==
- 1973: Los caballeros de la cama redonda (with Alberto Olmedo y Jorge Porcel).
- 1973: Los Doctores las prefieren desnudas (with Alberto Olmedo y Jorge Porcel).
- 1982: Señora de nadie (Isabel), known as Nobody’s Wife in USA.
- 1986: Soy paciente (unfinished).
- 1989: Eversmile, New Jersey directed by Carlos Sorín
- 1996: Autumn Sun: Silvia.
- 1998: Cohen vs. Rosi: Miriam Cohen.
- 2000: Waiting for the Messiah: Sara.
- 2011: My First Wedding ...Raquel
