= Cómo seducir a una mujer =

- Directed by: Ricardo Alventosa
- Written by: Ricardo Alventosa, Jose Martinez Suarez
- Release date: 1967
- Running time: 85 minute
- Country: Argentina
- Language: Spanish

Cómo seducir a una mujer (How to Seduce a Woman) is a 1967 Argentine film directed by Ricardo Alventosa with a screenplay by Ricardo Alventosa and Jose Martinez Suarez.

== Cast ==
- Ricardo Espalter as Juan Dominguez
- Raimundo Soto as Professor Alex
- Fernanda Mistral as Executive
- Estela Molly as Investigator
- Mercedes Harris as Sirvienta
- Claudia Sánchez as Widow
- Nacha Guevara as La dama del gatito
- Elida Marletta as Prostitute
- Alba Múgica as Juan's Mother
