= Carmen Vallejo =

Argentine actress and comedian

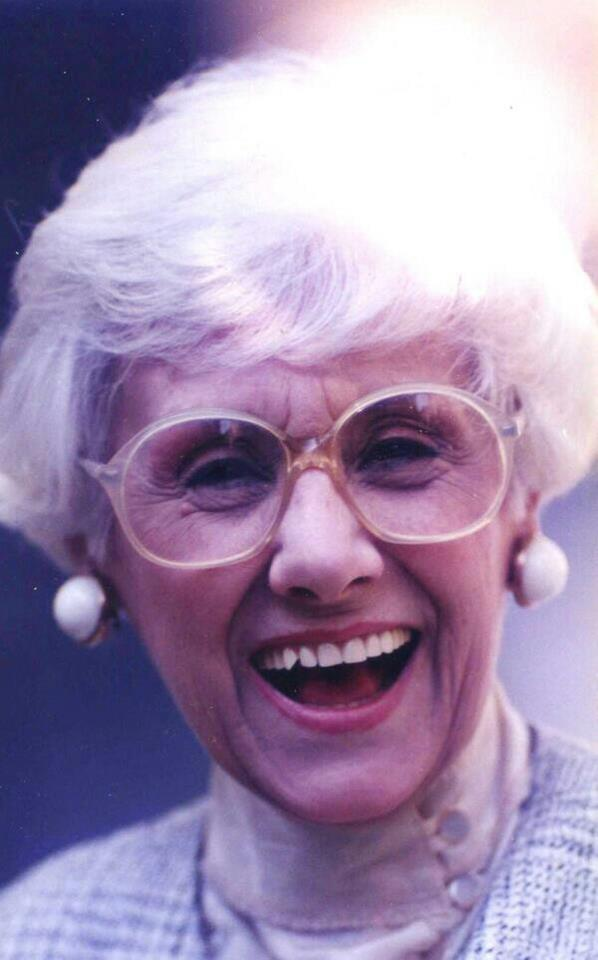

Carmen Vallejo (November 26, 1922, in La Plata, Argentina – April 20, 2013, in Buenos Aires, Argentina), was an Argentine actress and comedian.

== Biography ==
Vallejo began her career in theater and later debuted on radio. She was married to musician Oscar Aleman, with whom she performed on television throughout 1960s and 1970s. Later in her career, Vallejo held roles in several television series, such as Poné a Francella, Gasoleros and La Niñera. In 1999 Vallejo was honored by the Argentine Senate with the Honorable Achievement Award. In 2009 she was declared an Illustrious Citizen of Buenos Aires. At that time, there were over one hundred television programs and sixty plays to Vallejo's credit.

== Personal life ==
Vallejo married Adolfo Juan Giorno. Together they had a daughter, Selva, who was born in 1944. Later, Vallejo was in a relationship with jazz guitarist and composer Oscar Alemán. Vallejo and Alemá had a daughter, India. One of her grandchildren, Jorgelina, is a blues singer. Her son-in-law Arturo Puig is a noted actor.
