= Oscar Alemán =

Argentine jazz musician (1909–1980)

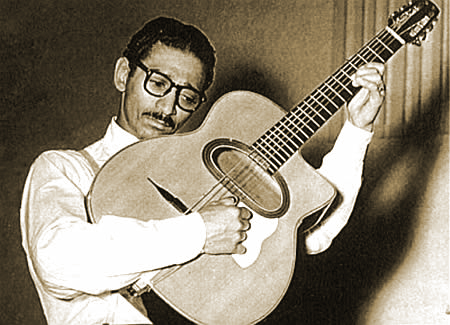
- Oscar Alemán

Background information
- Birth name: Oscar Marcelo Alemán Pereira
- Born: 20 February 1909; Machagai, Chaco, Argentina
- Died: 14 October 1980 (aged 71); Buenos Aires, Argentina
- Genres: Jazz, swing
- Occupation: Musician
- Instrument: Guitar
- Years active: 1915–1980
- Website: www.oscar-aleman.com.ar

Oscar Marcelo Alemán (20 February 1909 – 14 October 1980) was an Argentine jazz multi instrumentalist, guitarist, singer, and dancer.

== Biography ==
Alemán was born in Machagai, Chaco Province, in northern Argentina. He was the fourth child of seven born to pianist Marcela Pereira, a native Argentine, and Jorge Alemán Morales, of Uruguayan descent, who played guitar in a folk quartet with his children Carlos, Juan, and Jorgelina.

At the age of six, Alemán joined the family ensemble, the Moreira Sextet, and played the cavaquinho, a chordophone related to the ukulele, before taking up the guitar. The group travelled to Buenos Aires to perform at the Parque Japonés, Nuevo Theater, and at the Luna Park. Later they toured in Brazil.

Alemán was orphaned aged 10, when his mother died and his father committed suicide. He sustained himself by working sporadically as a dancer and musician on the streets of Santos, Brazil. When he saved enough money, he bought a guitar and started to play professionally at party venues in a duo called Los Lobos (Les Loups) with his friend, Brazilian guitarist Gastón Bueno Lobo. The duo moved to Buenos Aires in 1925 to work under contract for the comedian Pablo Palitos. In Buenos Aires, they formed a trio with violinist Elvino Vardaro. They added tango to their repertoire and recorded with Agustín Magaldi. They later played with Carlos Gardel and Enrique Santos Discépolo.

In 1929 Los Lobos and dancer Harry Fleming travelled to Europe. After the tour, Alemán stayed in Madrid to play as a soloist. In the 1930s he discovered American jazz through the music of Eddie Lang and Joe Venuti. He then moved to Paris, where he was hired by Josephine Baker to lead her band, the Baker Boys, at the Cafe de Paris, providing him an opportunity to play regularly with American musicians who would come to see Baker and perform with her band. In Paris he met Django Reinhardt, for whom he would sometimes substitute. Alemán said of their friendship,

"I knew Django Reinhardt well. He used to say jazz was gipsy—we often argued over that. I agree with many Americans I met in France who said he played very well but with too many gipsy tricks. He had very good technique for both hands, or rather one hand and a pick, because he always played with a pick. Not me, I play with my fingers. There are things you can't do with a pick—you can't strike the treble with two fingers and play something else on the bass string. But I admired him and he was my friend. He was my greatest friend in France. We played together many times, just for ourselves. I used to go to his wagon, where he lived. I've slept and eaten there—and also played! He had three or four guitars. Django never asked anyone to go to his wagon, but he made an exception with me. I appreciated him, and I believe the feeling was mutual."

Throughout the 1930s Alemán toured Europe, both as a member of Josephine Bakers' band and independently, playing with Louis Armstrong and Duke Ellington before forming a nine-piece band which would performed nightly at the Le Chantilly in Paris.

During the Nazi invasion of France during World War II Alemán returned to Argentina and was lauded as the most prominent Afro Argentine and Argentine jazz musician. He established a residency at the Alvear Palace Hotel, and had a hit with "Rosa Madreselva" ("Honeysuckle Rose"). Aleman also continued to record and perform with a swing quintet and a nine-piece orchestra. He became romantically involved with actress Carmen Vallejo with whom he had a daughter, Selva Alemán (1944 - 2024), who became a renowned actress. He remained popular into the late 1950s, before the rise of rock n roll and more popular developments in tango. In 1972, he recorded an album and reissued some of his music. He toured and appeared on television. He performed and taught in his native country until his death from an undisclosed illness at the age of 71 in 1980.

== Playing style ==
Alemán usually played with thumb pick and fingers and played the D-hole Selmer Maccaferri, a model also used by Django Reinhardt. He also a National Style 1 tri-cone resonator guitar, nylon string guitars, and archtop guitars.

== Awards and honors ==
Alemán's life is depicted in the documentary Oscar Aleman: Vida Con Swing, directed by Hernan Gaffet and in the graphic novel (in French) Le Roi Invisible by Gani Jakupi.

In 2002 an international jazz guitar festival, Festival Oscar Alemán, was created in his honor.

== Discography ==
- Hawaianita (1927–1929), Buenos Aires
- Ya Lo Sé (1930–1933), Madrid-Paris
- Fox-musette No. 301 (1933–1935), Paris
- St. Louis Stomp (1936–1938), Paris
- Doing the Gorgonzola (1939–1940), Paris
- Susurrando (1941–1942), Buenos Aires
- Negra de Cabello Duro (1943–1944), Buenos Aires
- Haciendo una Nueva Picardía (1945–1949), Buenos Aires
- Swanee River (1951), Buenos Aires
- Scartunas (1952), Buenos Aires
- Minuet (1953), Buenos Aires
- Ardiente sol (1954), Buenos Aires
- Estambul (1955), Buenos Aires
- Juca (1956–1957), Buenos Aires
- Guitarra de Amor (1965), Buenos Aires
- Sueño de Víbora (1966–1969), Buenos Aires
- Moritat (1970–1972), Buenos Aires
- Tengo Ritmo (1973–1978), Buenos Aires
- Vestido de Bolero (1979–1980), Buenos Aires
- Hombre Mío (1960–1980), Buenos Aires
- Sí...Otra Vez! (1979), Buenos Aires
- Swing Guitar Legend (Rambler, 1982)
- Swing Guitar Masterpieces 1938–1957 (Acoustic Disc, 1998)

== Filmography ==
- Three Argentines in Montmartre (1941)
- Buenos Aires Sings (1947)
