= The Now and Then Show =

The Now and Then Show is a television show based in Mendocino, California, which ran from 1985 to 1987, and it still appears in reruns. It was a mix of talk show and sketch comedy. The show was hosted by Odd Bob Avery, with two separate co-hosts, Meg Harris (1985–86) and Kelly Peterson (1986–87). The programme had an orchestra, which was originally headed by Lewis DeMetri, then by Garth Beckington and Bugs Anderson, and finally by Michael Ward. The satirical comedy commercials were written by Bugs Anderson, Garth Beckington, and Mike L. Evans. The Mikey Rooney segment was solely written by Mike L. Evans, who was also the writer, producer and director of the programme.

Notable guests included artist Larry Fuente, musicians Tommy Tutone, Joel Scott Hill, Gene Parsons and Guy Hoffman.
