= Truthhorse =

Truthhorse was a Canadian sketch comedy troupe. Truthhorse had a TV series in 2004 on The Comedy Network. It was also called Truthhorse and lasted one season. The six members of Truthhorse were Brad Cowan, Matt Kassirer, Art Maughan, Ryan McCammon, Mike Mills, and Bryan Reid.
