= Arturo Puig =

Argentine actor

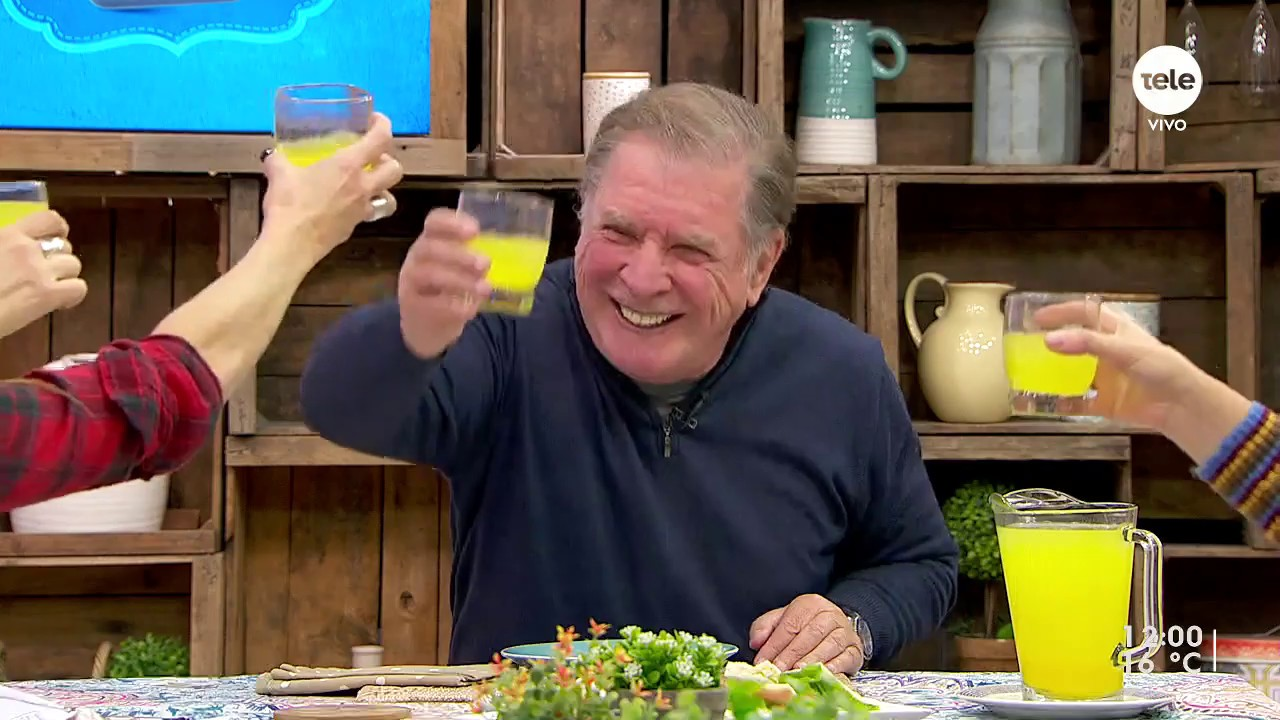
- Puig in 2019
- Born: Arturo José Alberto Puig Petrosini; 17 November 1944 (age 81); Buenos Aires, Argentina
- Occupation: Actor
- Years active: 1967–present
- Spouse: Selva Alemán (m. 2001)
- Children: 2

Arturo José Alberto Puig Petrosini (born 17 November 1944) is an Argentine actor. He has worked in the 1990s success Grande, pá!!!

== Biography ==
Arturo Puig became famous as the lead actor of 1970s telenovelas, such as "Me llaman gorrión" (1972) and "Pablo en nuestra piel" (1977).

He was the lead actor of Grande, pá!, a big success in Argentine television during the 1990s. The TV channel Telefe proposed him to make a remake, but he refused, as the channel did not want to hire the full cast of the original series as Puig proposed.

In the 2000s he has worked sporadically in TV, becoming instead a notable theater actor. He worked in plays such as "El Precio", "Cristales rotos" and "Panorama desde el puente", by Arthur Miller, "¿Quién le teme a Virginia Woolf?" by Edward Albee, and "La vuelta al hogar" by Harold Pinter. In "Rompiendo códigos" he played the British mathematician Alan Turing.

As of 2013, he plays the gay parent of the main character of the Solamente Vos comedy telenovela. He mentioned that he is satisfied that modern television does not use self-censorship on such topics anymore. This is not the first time that Puig played a gay character: besides the play on Alan Turing, he had played another one in Botines, but not under a comedic tone. He also worked in the successful film Tesis sobre un homicidio. Thanks to Gustavo Yankelevich, he worked as a theater director for the first time, in the play Le Prénom, with actors Germán Palacios, Jorgelina Aruzzi, Mercedes Funes, Carlos Belloso and Peto Menahem.

He was married to Selva Aleman, making his mother-in-law the famous actress Carmen Vallejo.

In 2026, Puig voiced José de San Martín in El Libertador, a short film produced by Infobae that uses artificial intelligence to recreate his meeting with Domingo Faustino Sarmiento in France in 1846.

== Works ==
=== Cinema ===
- Los Muchachos de mi barrio (1970)
- El Veraneo de los Campanelli (1971)
- He nacido en la ribera (1972)
- Me gusta esa chica (1973)
- El Amor infiel (1974)
- Carmiña: Su historia de amor (1975)
- Los Días que me diste (1975)
- La Hora de María y el pájaro de oro (1975)
- Un Idilio de estación (1978)
- La Conquista del paraíso (1981)
- Contar hasta diez (1985)
- Prontuario de un argentino (1987)
- Kindergarten (1989)
- La Frontera olvidada (1996)
- Lugares comunes (2002)
- Los Marziano (2011)
- Tesis sobre un homicidio (2013)

=== Television ===
- Ella, la gata (1968)
- Nino, las cosas simples de la vida (1971)
- Así en la villa como en el cielo (1971)
- Carmiña (1972)
- Pablo en nuestra piel (1977)
- El Tema es el amor (1977)
- Vos y yo, toda la vida (1978)
- Chau, amor mío (1979)
- Ceremonia secreta (1981)
- Barracas al sur (1981)
- Cuando vuelvas a mí (1986)
- Mujer comprada (1986)
- Vínculos (1987)
- Atreverse (1990)
- Grande Pá! (1991)
- Destinos (1992)
- El Rafa (1997)
- Primicias (2000)
- El Precio del poder (2002)
- Dr. Amor (2003)
- Hombres de honor (2005)
- Botines (2005)
- Solamente vos (2013)

=== Theatre ===
- Cartas de Amor (2004)
- Panorama desde el puente (2004)
- ¿Quién le teme a Virginia Woolf? (2007)
- El precio (2011)

== Award Nominations ==
- 2013 Martín Fierro Awards
  - Best secondary actor (for Solamente Vos)
