= Graciela Taquini =

Argentine artist (1941–2026)

- Taquini in 2022
- Born: Graciela Alicia Taquini; 1 July 1941; Buenos Aires, Argentina
- Died: 19 September 2026 (aged 85)
- Education: University of Buenos Aires
- Awards: Konex Platinum Award (2012); Konex Award (2022)
- Website: https://gracielataquini.info/

Graciela Alicia Taquini (1 July 1941 – 19 September 2026) was an Argentine aritst, curator and teacher. In 2012, she received the Konex Award, 10 years later, she won another Konex Award in Visual arts in 2022.

== Early life and education ==
Graciela Alicia Taquini was born in Buenos Aires on 1 July 1941. She had Italian, Basque, and French heritage. She was the youngest daughter of César Taquini, a lawyer, and his wife, Alcira Taquini. In 1963, she entered the Faculty of Philosophy and Letters at the University of Buenos Aires, which was established by Julio Payró. She did not graduate at that juncture because of problems in the nation such as the Argentine Revolution and the Night of the Long Batons. After finally graduating in Art History in 1969, she received a scholarship from the Institute of Hispanic Culture to study Christian art at the University of Barcelona, before returning to Argentina to teach art history in 1971.

== Career ==
Taquini started her career as an art historian in the 1970s. She began creating her own video art and media installations in 1988. Her artwork Roles became popular as one of her first artworks she had made. Then, she began getting popularity for her artworks such as Lo sublime/banal in 2004, which led to 14th Videobrasil International Electronic Art Festival in São Paulo, and Resonancia in 2005. Her 2011 exhibition, Grata con otros, was hosted at the Centro Cultural General San Martín.

In 1979, Taquini directed a video art program at the Buenos Aires Museum of Modern Art. Between 1980 and 1981, she moved to the United States, where she taught Spanish and art at Bennington College in Vermont. At the end of the academic year, she obtained an internship at the Smithsonian Institution's National Museum of American History, where she completed a series of courses on museography. In 2004, she was awarded a grant from the Ministry of Culture of the Presidency of the Nation to travel as a curator of Argentina. In 2007, she received the Proyecto Intercampos grant from Fundación Telefónica, and in 2010, another grant for group projects from the Fondo Nacional de las Artes.

In 2012, she won a Konex Platinum Award, ten years later in 2022, she won another Konex award in Grand Jury.

== Personal life and death ==
Taquini was married to Alberto Farina. She died on 19 September 2026, at the age of 85.
