= Pepe Biondi =

Argentine comedian, acrobat and variety artist in circus, theater, film and television

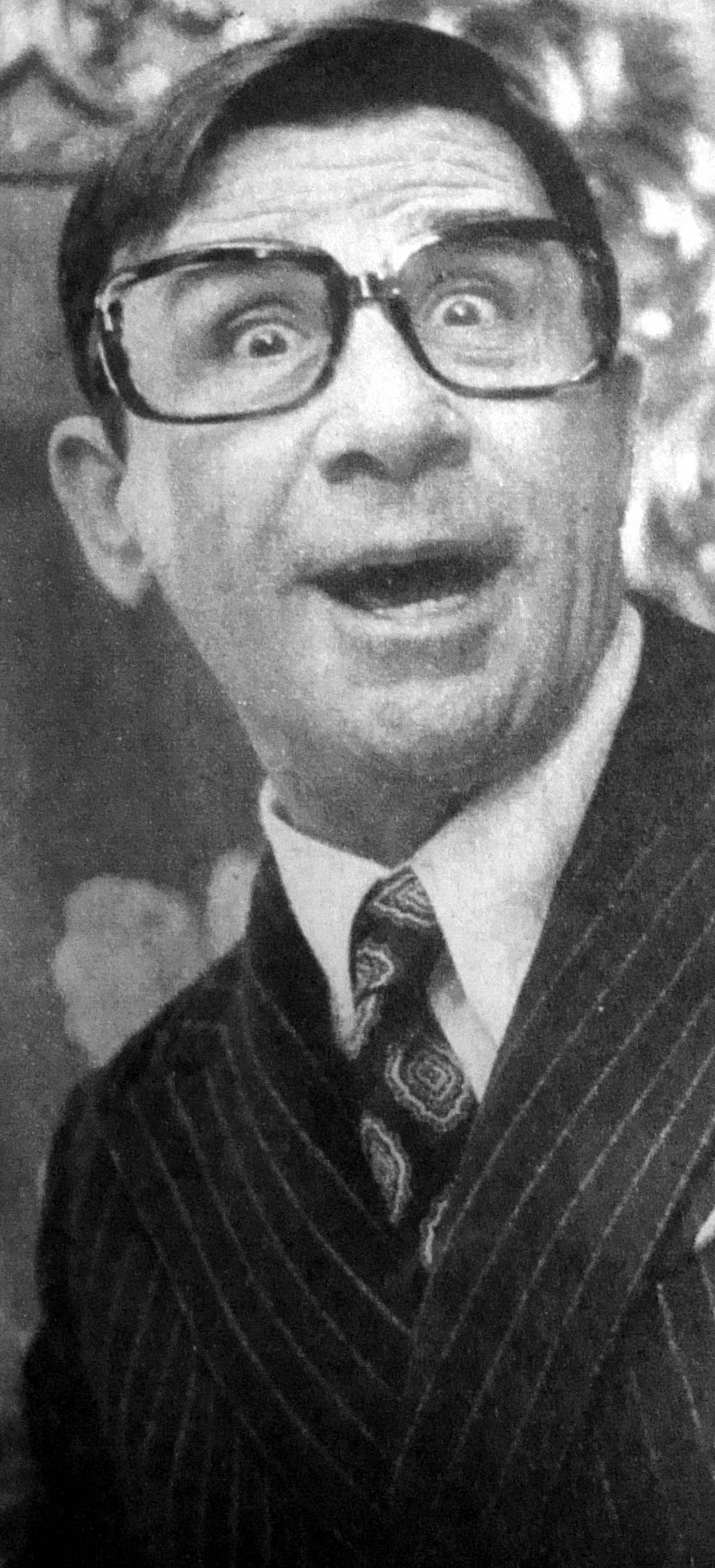
Pepe Biondi in 1972.

José "Pepe" Biondi (born Buenos Aires, September 4, 1909 - died Buenos Aires, October 4, 1975) was an Argentine comedian, acrobat and variety artist who worked in the circus, theater, film and television. For both critics and the public, Biondi was one of the greatest Argentine comedians, who stood out for his innocent and clownish humor. In Pope Francis's memoir Hope: The Autobiography, he discusses his love of comedy by using Biondi as an example of one of his favorites from his childhood in Argentina, with lines going around the block for Biondi's films.
