= Berugo Carámbula =

Uruguayan actor, comedian and television presenter (1945–2015)

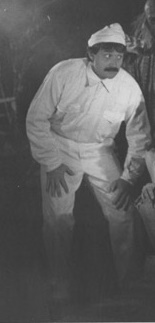
- Carámbula in 1987
- Born: Heber Hugo Carámbula; 31 October 1945; Las Piedras, Uruguay
- Died: 14 November 2015 (aged 70); Buenos Aires, Argentina
- Spouse: Adriana Carámbula
- Children: 3 (Joaquín, Gabriel and María)

Heber Hugo Carámbula (31 October 1945 – 14 November 2015), known by his stage name Berugo Carámbula, was a Uruguayan actor, comedian and television presenter, born in Las Piedras.

== Career ==
Carámbula started his career as a musician; in 1960 formed the jazz band "Crazy Clown Jazz Band". Later, already a comedian, was part of the cast in the Uruguayan TV program Telecataplum, for which he became well known in Argentina, altogether with the other members of the cast: Ricardo Espalter, Eduardo D'Angelo, Enrique Almada, Henny Trayles, and Raimundo Soto, among others.

As an actor, Carámbula was an important member of several comedies on films, theatres and TV programs, and the TV series Son amores. He was also hired as TV host of other programs, both in Argentina and Uruguay. As a musician, he recorded in 1976 el the LP Solo de Guitarra, his only production as a classical guitar soloist. In 1988, Carámbula was awarded with the Martín Fierro Award as the best TV host for his work in Atrévase a Soñar (Dare to Dream).

On 28 November 2008, the Departmental Board of Canelones rendered a homage to Carámbula declaring him illustrious citizen of the departamento.

== Illness and death ==
In 2004, Carámbula was diagnosed with Parkinson's disease which caused him to retire from TV and theatre work for four years. He died on 14 November 2015, aged 70, in Buenos Aires of the disease.

== Filmography ==
- Joven viuda y estanciera (1970)
- Los irrompibles (1975)
- La noche del hurto (1976)
- Donde duermen dos... duermen tres (1979)
- Cantaniño cuenta un cuento (1979)
- Señora de nadie (1982)
- Brigada explosiva (1986)
- Brigada explosiva contra los ninjas (1986)
- Los Bañeros más locos del mundo (1987)
- Los matamonstruos en la mansión del terror (1987)

=== Television ===
- Telecataplum (1963)
- Jaujarana (1969)
- Hupumorpo (1974)
- Supershow Infantil (1979)
- Comicolor (1980)
- El Club de Anteojito (1983)
- Hiperhumor (1986)
- Venga y Atrévase a soñar (1987)
- Amo a Berugo (1991)
- Todo al 9 (1991)
- Clink! Caja (1996)
- Jugar x jugar con Berugo (1999)
- El Nieto de don Mateo (2000)
- Hacete la América (2000)
- Bien de bien (2000)
- Son amores (2002–2003)

=== Theatre ===
- Con Berugo en Grupo (junto a "Tocata y Fuga") (2008)
