= Live on Tape =

- Created by: Thomas Hart
- Starring: (see article)
- Country of origin: United States
- No. of episodes: 56

Production
- Running time: 30 minutes

Original release
- Network: KLJB-TV
- Release: July 4, 1987 – September 2, 1989

Live on Tape is a late night comedy sketch show that aired on Saturday nights at 10pm on KLJB-TV in Davenport, Iowa from 1987 to 1989, and repeated through 1990. It was the only locally produced entertainment show at that time in the Quad Cities area.

Live on Tape was a locally produced, low budget show, featuring characters such as E.J. Crackerhorn, Arnie Upshoe, Guy Newswarthy, Uncle Joey, Nosey, Clive Knobfinder, Zippy Spamhammer, Bongo the Exploding Clown, and plenty more.

Much of the humor poked fun at local and national personalities, spoofed commercials and TV shows, but also included silly adventures of the show's cast of regular characters—be that sending them through a black hole after a stockpile of powerful hairspray goes nuclear and blasts them into space, or bombing Kewanee, Illinois with Mallo Cups in a failed attempt to keep Cosmonauts Ivan Drombollo and Voster Slepenski from taking over the air-waves.

== Cast members ==
- Thomas Hart
- John (Janos) Horvath
- Don Abbott
- Brandon Lovested
- Merlin Nelson Jr.
- Pete Calderone
- Monta Ponsetto
- Scott Hoyt
- Jim Peterson
- Mike Carron
- Jennifer Hanson
- Larry Brennan
- Brad Hauskins
- Leann Donovan
- Barb Engstrom
- Patti Flaherty
- Pat Flaherty
- Scott Tunnicliff
- Greg Baldwin
- Lora Adams
- Denise Hollmer
- Donny Bargmann Jr.
- John Bain
