= Tumbleweed Theater =

- Genre: Western; Comedy; Anthology
- Based on: Characters created by Riders in the Sky
- Written by: Fred LaBour; Steve Arwood
- Directed by: Jim "Moose" Edwards; Randy Hale
- Starring: Riders in the Sky
- Narrated by: Steve Arwood
- Country of origin: United States
- No. of seasons: 5

Production
- Editor: Russ McGowan (film editor)

Original release
- Network: The Nashville Network
- Release: March 7, 1983 – 1988

Tumbleweed Theater is an American anthology television series starring western/comedy band Riders in the Sky. It ran from 1983 to 1988. Each week, the Riders presented a B-Western/singing cowboy movie from the 1930s or 40s, and performed songs and sketches between segments of the film.

== Creation ==
In late 1982, the Riders in the Sky were approached by Steve Arwood, Ned Ramage, and Randy Hale to host an anthology series to be featured on a new television network called The Nashville Network. The Riders agreed to host, and began taping the host segments for season one in January 1983. It premiered on March 7, 1983, the same day the Nashville Network began broadcasting. An original, music-only pilot was shot at the new Bullet Studios on Music Row. It was a music-only pilot. It featured John Hartford and Buddy Spicher as special guest. The remainder of the season (26 shows) was shot at WSMV studios. Season two was shot on the new Opry stage at Opryland. Season 3 was shot in Studio C at Opryland. Celebration Productions was the video production company.

== Seasons four & five ==
By 1986, three seasons worth of material had been filmed for Tumbleweed Theater. When Steve Arwood went to settle contracts for season four with TNN's new director of programing Paul Corbin, Corbin asked if the Riders were managed by David Skepner. When Arwood said that they were managed by Skepner, Corbin said, "Well, we don't really like David Skepner around here," and the Riders were fired from TNN. A fourth and fifth season was made up of repackaged sketches from the previous three seasons.

== Cast ==
- Douglas B. Green - Ranger Doug and other characters
- Paul Chrisman - Woody Paul and other characters
- Fred LaBour - Too Slim and other characters
- Steve Arwood - Texas Bix Bender (announcer)

== Crew ==
- Director/switcher - Jim "Moose" Edwards
- Director/editor - Randy Hale
- Producers - Steve Arwood, Randy Hale, Ned Ramage
- Show creators - Ned Ramage, Randy Hale

== Legacy ==
TNN later revisited the idea of showing classic black and white B-Westerns with Roy Rogers' Happy Trails Theater and Gene Autry's Melody Ranch. Rogers and Autry hosted their respective shows and talked about the movie of the week in between segments of the films.

Many of the sketches and characters that originated from Tumbleweed Theater would be carried over into Riders Radio Theater, a National Public Radio show hosted by the Riders.

== Home media ==
A VHS tape titled The Best of Tumbleweed Theater was the only official home video release of any Tumbleweed Theater clips, which consisted of select songs and sketches the Riders performed on the show. It was only released and sold through the Riders' official website and at concert events. The tape was re-released in the late 90s and sold as an official DVD in the mid-2000s.
