= Luisa Vehil =

Uruguayan actress

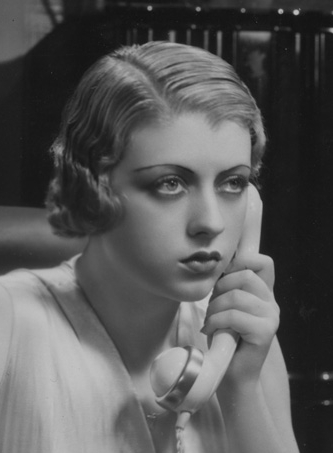
Luisa Vehil in Los tres berretines (1933).

Luisa Vehil (November 12, 1912, in Montevideo, Uruguay – October 24, 1991, in Buenos Aires, Argentina) was an Uruguayan theater and movie actress who had a notable career in Argentina during the Golden Age of Argentine cinema. She was an iconic figure in the Argentine theatre scene.

== Biography ==
Luisa Vehil was born in 1912 in Montevideo, Uruguay, she belongs to an eight generation dynasty of actors originally from Catalonia; daughter and granddaughter of theatre players. Her brothers were Paquita and Juan. She was also the aunt of actors Miguel Ángel Solá and Mónica Vehil.

Luisa moved to Buenos Aires, Argentina at an early age, and starred in her first movie in 1933, Los tres berretines, directed by Enrique Telémaco Susini. It was the second Argentine talk movie. She went on to appear in other minor 'talkies' throughout the '30s, working in tango-oriented films by famed tango writer Manuel Romero and Eduardo Morera.

Opposite to Juan Perón regime she suffered an attack when playing the leading role in the play Fascination.

Vehil's next big role was in Pampa bárbara, an epic western directed by Lucas Demare and Hugo Fregonese. It was her second and last screen appearance throughout the '40s; likewise, she acted in film once per decade – once in the '50s (En la ardiente oscuridad, by Daniel Tinayre, 1958) and once in the '60s (El bote, el río y la gente, 1960).

Her main activity was the theater where she was regarded as one of the Grand-Dames of the national scene. She played Mary Stuart, Juana La Loca, Samuel Beckett's Happy Days, Madame Desmortes in Jean Anouilh's L'Invitation au Château and L'Alouette (The Lark) and Alejandro Casona's Los árboles mueren de pie.

Between 1964 and 1967 she directed the Argentina's National Comedy and was also a member of the National Fund for Arts.

She made a comeback in the '70s, appearing in films by Juan Bautista Stagnaro, Alejandro Doria and Luis Saslavsky. She would work with Doria one more time in 1982, in Los pasajeros del jardín.

Turning to TV, Vehil starred in the hour-long program Navidad en el año 2000 in 1981 and hosted the show Las 24 horas from 1982 to 1985. Her last acting performance was in Kindergarten (1989), a controversial film by Jorge Polaco, censored one day short from its release (the first case of censorship in the country following the end of the Dirty War six years prior).

Luisa Vehil was honored as an "Illustrious Citizen of the City of Buenos Aires" in 1990. In 1981 she received the Platinum and Diamond Konex Award.

She died from natural causes on October 24, 1991.

== Selected filmography ==
- Savage Pampas (1945)
