= Raimundo Soto =

Uruguayan actor (1914–1983)

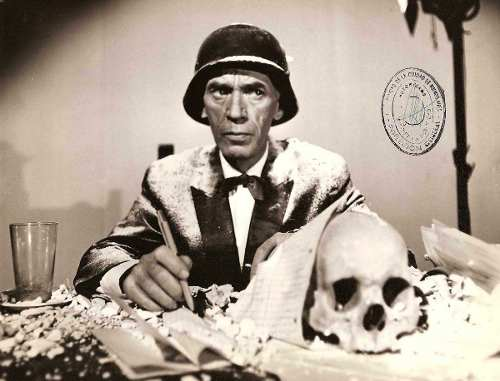
Soto in 1970

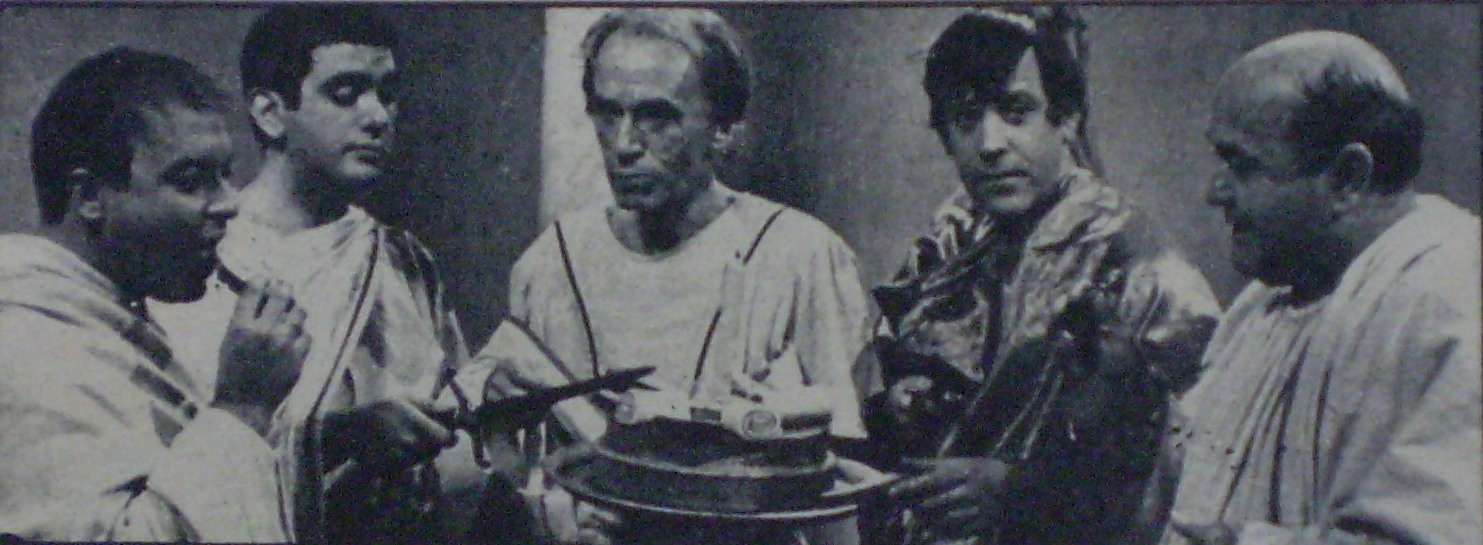
Part of "Telecataplúm" cast, from left to right: Enrique Almada, Eduardo D'Angelo, Raimundo Soto, Ricardo Espalter and Emilio Vidal.

Edmundo Rey Kelly (known as Raimundo Soto; 1914 in Montevideo, Uruguay – July 7, 1983 in Montevideo, Uruguay) was an Uruguayan actor during the country's Golden Age of film.

He also starred several television comedy shows in Uruguay, Argentina, Chile and other Latin American countries, together with a famous group of Uruguayans: Ricardo Espalter, Enrique Almada, Eduardo D'Angelo, Andrés Redondo, Berugo Carámbula, Henny Trayles, Julio Frade.

Soto worked as an announcer created a disc jockey and entertainment program on Uruguayan Radio, Centenario. also in previews year was co-owner with his Brother Mario Reykelly of Advertising Company call Reykelly & Berens Advertise.

== Filmography ==
- 1965: La Industria del matrimonio
- 1966: El horno no está para bollos
- 1967: Cómo seducir a una mujer
- 1971: Paula contra la Mitad Más Uno
- 1971: La Gran Ruta
- 1973: Yo gané el Prode, ¿y Usted?
- 1974: Clínica con Música
- 1976: El Gordo de América
- 1976: La Noche del Hurto
- 1976: Tú me enloqueces
- 1977: El Soltero
- 1977: Brigada en Acción
- 1977: La Obertura

Television

- 1963: Telecataplúm
- 1963/1968: Operación Ja-Já
- 1970/1971: Jaujarana Punch
- 1974: Hupumorpo
- 1975: Siesta
- 1977: Decalegrón
