= Julio Frade =

Uruguayan comedian (1943–2025)

Julio César Frade Pintos (3 November 1943 – 19 September 2025) was a Uruguayan pianist, comedian, actor, and broadcaster. One of the most recognized figures in Uruguayan culture and entertainment, his career spanned almost seven decades. He was part of television programs such as Telecataplúm, Comicolor, Hupumorpo, Hiperhumor, and Decalegrón. Alongside colleagues like Ricardo Espalter, Enrique Almada, Berugo Carámbula, and Eduardo D'Angelo, he was considered one of the last exponents of Uruguay's "golden generation" of comedy.

Frade pursued a parallel career in music, performing with Astor Piazzolla in 1982, directing orchestras, and representing Uruguay in 26 editions of the OTI Festival. He served as musical director of Uruguayan television channels, as director of Canal 5, and as general manager of Radio Carve and Radio Oriental. For four decades, he hosted the radio program Frade con permiso. In 2012, he was named Illustrious Citizen of Montevideo. Frade died in Montevideo on 19 September 2025.

== Early life and education ==
Frade was born in Montevideo in 1944. Frade began studying piano at age four, made his professional debut at 14 with the orchestra of the Embassy cabaret, and at 17 received a scholarship to study jazz in New York. Lodging with a local family who bought him a piano two weeks later, he joined his school's jazz band and immersed himself in the city's scene.

== Career ==
=== Music ===
On his return to Uruguay, Frade joined the jazz band Chicago Stompers and later led various orchestras. In 1982, he performed with Astor Piazzolla, becoming the only Uruguayan to do so. He served as musical director at Uruguay's Channels 4, 10, and 12, and between 1990 and 1995 was director of Canal 5. He represented Uruguay in 26 editions of the OTI International Festival and produced the music events Costa a Costa and Parque del Plata. In September 2024, he performed a concert at the Nelly Goitiño Auditorium to mark his 80th birthday.

Frade recorded Música en serio in 1974 and arranged Rubén Rada's album Radeces in 1975. In 2000, he released Tango Sur Trío with Danie Lagarde and Mario Núñez. In 2017, he released Sesenta años no es nada to mark six decades of his career.

=== Television and comedy ===
Frade's work as a comedian made him a well-known figure in both Argentina and Uruguay. He made his television debut on Telecataplúm as a musician and later as an actor. He later appeared on Comicolor, Jaujarana, Hiperhumor and, Rapicómicos. In the late 1970s, he joined the founding cast of Decalegrón, which ran for nearly 25 years until 2001. His characters included Adrianita, El Chicho, El Buda, the "enlightened patron", and the children's character Abelardito in Casquito y Cascote. He worked with Ricardo Espalter, Eduardo D'Angelo, Enrique Almada, and Andrés Redondo. Frade's final television appearance was as an expert on the Canal 4 version of Los 8 escalones, hosted by Gustaf.

=== Radio ===
Frade worked at stations including Carve and Oriental, where he became general manager. For forty years, he hosted the program Frade con permiso on Radio Clarín. In August 2025, he announced his retirement as his health had begun to decline. The show continued under the title Con su permiso, hosted by Ivanna Vázquez and Roberto Riolfo.

=== Other ===
In 2023, Frade published an autobiography, Gracias Señor.

== Awards and recognitions ==
In April 2012, the city of Montevideo named Frade an Illustrious Citizen of Montevideo in recognition of his artistic career. The decision was announced at a public ceremony held on 18 April 2012.

== Personal life and death ==
Frade retired from public life in 2025 after leaving his long-running radio program Frade con permiso, following a career of more than sixty years. He died in Montevideo on 19 September 2025 at the age of 81 from heart disease. He was buried at Cemeterio del Buceo. He was survived by his daughters, Virginia and Florencia, and by two grandsons.

== Bibliography ==
- Atienza, Ángel; Frade, Julio (2023). Julio Frade. Gracias, señor (in Spanish). Montevideo: Editorial Planeta. ISBN 9789915674889.
