= Decalegrón =

Uruguayan TV comedy

Decalegrón was a Uruguayan television comedy programme which aired on Saeta TV Channel 10 from 1977 till 2002.

Notable for its refined sense of humour, the programme won several awards.

== Cast ==
- Ricardo Espalter
- Enrique Almada
- Eduardo D'Angelo
- Raimundo Soto
- Julio Frade
