= Ricardo Espalter =

Uruguayan actor (1924–2007)

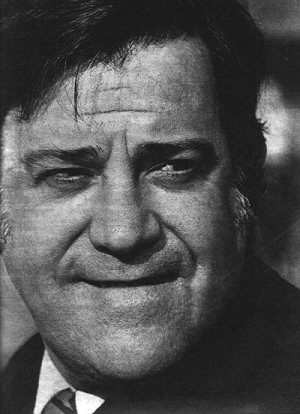
- Espalter in 1974
- Born: Ricardo Espalter Arrieta; 14 April 1924; Montevideo, Uruguay
- Died: 10 March 2007 (aged 82); Maldonado, Uruguay
- Resting place: Cementerio del Norte
- Occupations: Actor; comedian
- Children: 2

Ricardo Espalter Arrieta (14 April 1924 – 10 March 2007) was a Uruguayan actor and comedian. During his career spanning more than 40 years in film, theater, and television, he was especially noted for his performances in sketch comedy programs in Uruguay and Argentina, where he portrayed particularly memorable characters.

== Biography ==
In the 1960s he started a long career on television. Together with a notable group of Uruguayan humorists (Eduardo D'Angelo, Enrique Almada, Julio Frade, Berugo Carámbula, Henny Trayles, Raimundo Soto), he was part of several successful humor programs: Telecataplúm, Jaujarana, Hupumorpo, Comicolor, Híperhumor, Decalegrón.

Very cherished by the public of Uruguay and Argentina, he was notable for his expressive facial gestures. He showed an indescribable worried face which suddenly changed attitude, provoking the hilarity of the public.

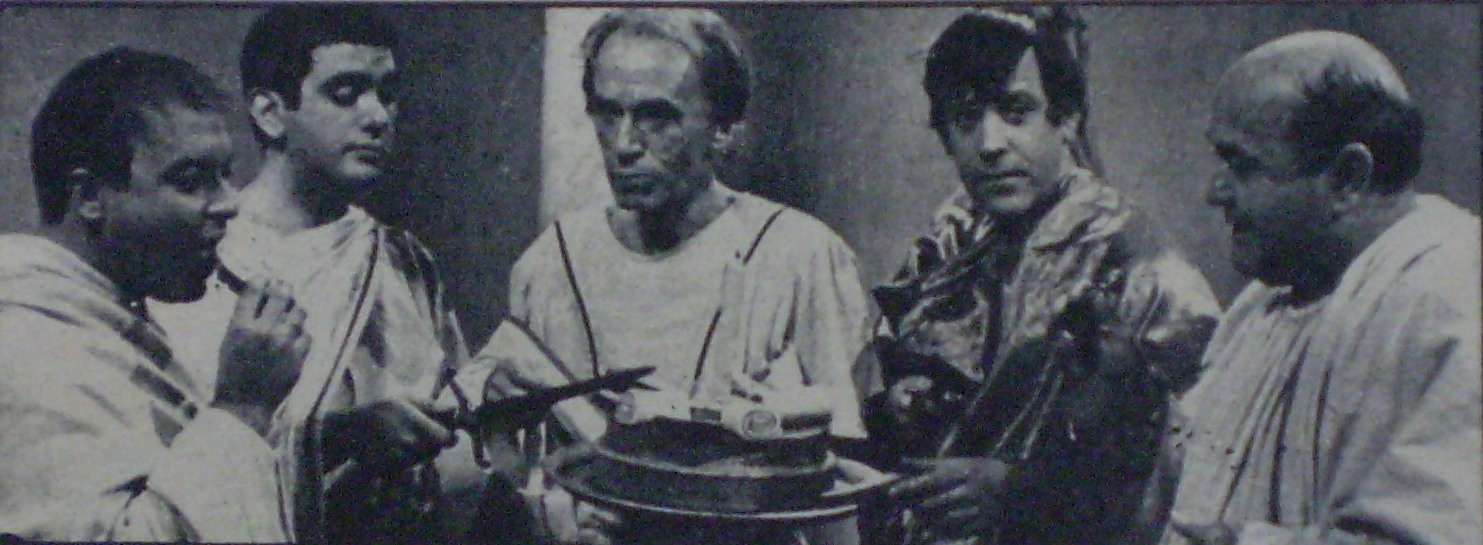
Part of "Telecataplúm" cast, from left to right: Enrique Almada, Eduardo D'Angelo, Raimundo Soto, Ricardo Espalter and Emilio Vidal.

In 1974 he received the Martín Fierro Award.

== Television ==
- Telecataplúm (1962)
- Jaujarana (1969-1972)
- Hupumorpo (1974-1977)
- Comicolor (1980-1983)
- Híperhumor (1984-1989)
- Decalegrón (1977-2002)
- Son de diez (1992-1995)

== Cinema ==
- La raya amarilla (corto) (1962)
- La Industria del matrimonio (1964)
- Cómo seducir a una mujer (1967)
- ¡Quiero besarlo, señor! (1973)
- Los irrompibles (1975)
- La Película (1975)
- La noche del hurto (1976)
- La Fiesta de todos (1978)
- Toto Paniagua, el rey de la chatarra (1980)
- El telo y la tele (1985)
- Los taxistas del humor (1987)
- La pandilla aventurera (1990)
- El dirigible (1994)
- Maldita Cocaína (2000)

== Bibliography ==
- Rodríguez, Franklin (1997). El comediante: biografía imposible de Ricardo Espalter. Planeta. ISBN 978-9974-643-01-7.
