= Esteban Courtalon =

Argentine cinematographer

Pablo Esteban Courtalon (born July 21, 1940) is an Argentine cinematographer.

From Santa Fe in Argentina, Courtalon was worked on some 20 films in the Cinema of Argentina since 1965 such as El Acomodador (1975), Eversmile, New Jersey (1989) and Alambrado in 1991.

== Filmography ==
- Sub terra (2003)
- Cicatrices (2001)
- Ladrón y su mujer, Un (2001)
- Maria Luisa en la niebla (1999) (TV)
- Entusiasmo, El (1998)
- Pasos de baile (1997)
- Siempre es difícil volver a casa (1992)
- Alambrado (1991)
- Última siembra, La (1991)
- Eversmile, New Jersey (1989)
- Kindergarten (1989)
- En el nombre del hijo (1987)
- Memorias y olvidos (1987)
- Película del rey, La (1986)
- Reinaldo Solar (1986)
- Juguete rabioso, El (1984)
- Boda, La (1982)
- Acomodador, El (1975)
- Palo y hueso (1968)
- Después de hora (1965)
