= Enrique Almada =

Uruguayan actor and author (1934–1990)

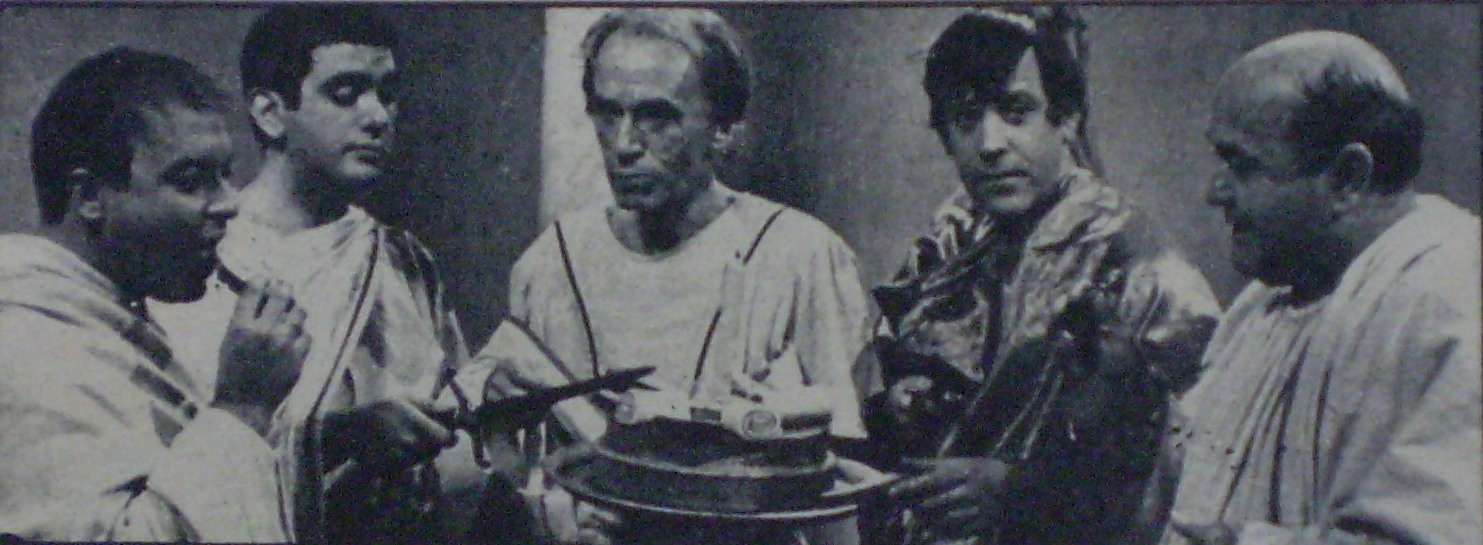
The Telecataplúm cast, from left to right: Andrés Redondo, Eduardo D'Angelo, Raimundo Soto, Ricardo Espalter and Emilio Vidal.

Enrique Milton Almada Cavo (15 July 1934, in Montevideo – 29 April 1990), also known as Quique Almada, was a Uruguayan actor and comedian.

In the 1960s, he started a long career on television. Together with a notable group of Uruguayan humorists (Eduardo D'Angelo, Ricardo Espalter, Julio Frade, Raimundo Soto), he was part of several successful humor programs: Telecataplúm (1962), Jaujarana (1969–1972), Hupumorpo (1974–1977), Comicolor (1980–1984), Híperhumor (1984–1989), Decalegrón (1977–2002).

In 1990, he died of cancer. The Uruguayan Senate held a solemn session in his honor.
