= Henny Trayles =

Uruguayan actress (1937–2022)

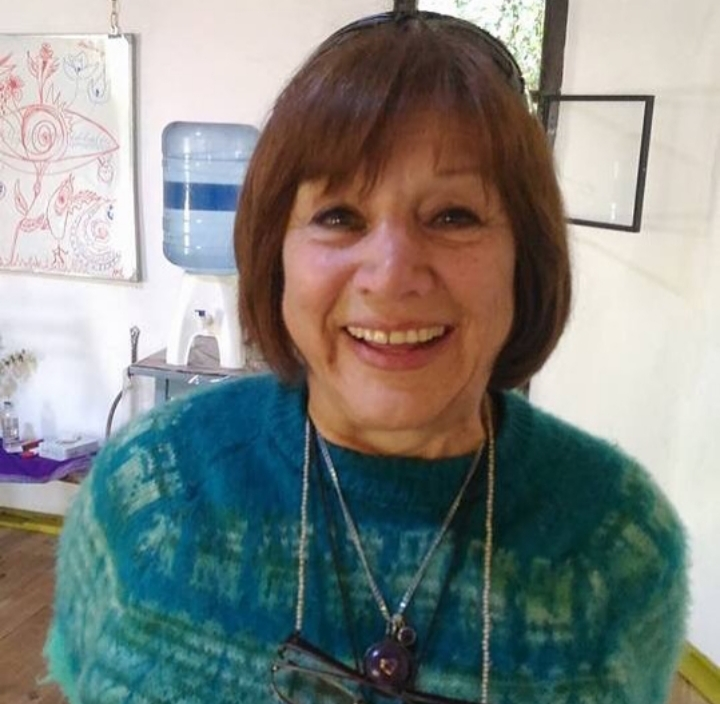

Henny Trylesinski, also known as Henny Trayles (4 June 1937 – 17 February 2022) was a German-born Uruguayan actress and comedian who lived in Argentina. Born in Hamburg, Germany, Trayles died on 17 February 2022, at the age of 84.

== Television ==
- Telecataplúm, (1962)
- Show Rambler, (1965)
- Jaujarana, (1969)
- Hupumorpo, (1975)
- Comicolor, (1978)
- Hiperhumor, (1980)
- La viuda blanca, (1986)
- Mi cuñado, (1993), Corina
- Como vos & yo, (1998), Serafina
- Verano del '98, (1998), Rosario
- Buenos vecinos, (1999)
- Franco Buenaventura, el profe, (2002), Margarita
- Máximo corazón, (2002, Sara Sokolovski
- Floricienta, (2004–2005), Greta
- El código Rodriguez, (2006), María Julia de Rodríguez
- Reparaciones, (2007), Lidia
- Una de dos, (2008)
- Todos contra Juan, (2008), Marta Perugia
- Todos contra Juan 2, (2010), Marta Perugia
- Graduados, (2012), Roxana Peicovich
- Solamente vos, (2013)
- Viudas e hijos del Rock & Roll, (2015), Ruth
