= Eduardo D'Angelo =

Uruguayan actor, comedian and impressionist (1939–2014)

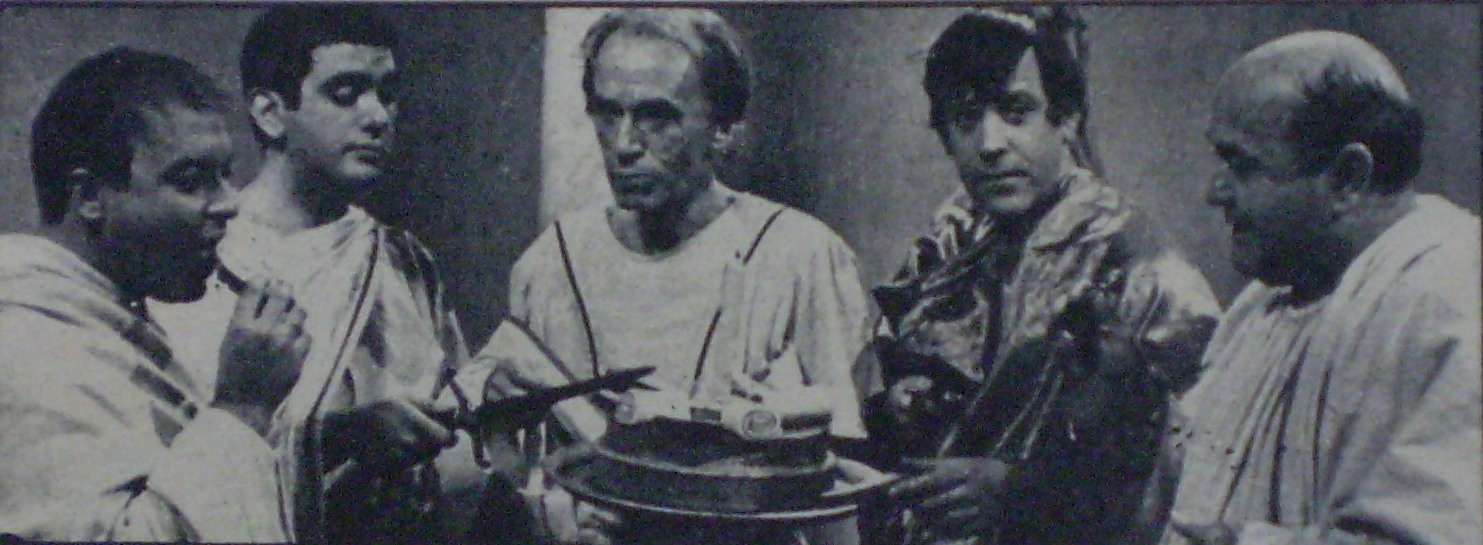
The Telecataplúm cast, from left to right: Enrique Almada, D'Angelo, Raimundo Soto, Ricardo Espalter and Emilio Vidal

Eduardo Luis D'Angelo Belsito (Montevideo, 4 January 1939 – 18 October 2014) was a Uruguayan actor, comedian and impressionist.

In the 1960s, he started a long career on television. Together with a notable group of Uruguayan humorists (Ricardo Espalter, Enrique Almada, Julio Frade, Raimundo Soto), he was part of several successful humor programs: Telecataplúm (1962), Jaujarana (1969-1972), Hupumorpo (1974-1977), Comicolor (1981-1984), Híperhumor (1984-1989), Decalegrón (1977-2002).

In 1989, he took part in the film Eversmile, New Jersey alongside Daniel Day-Lewis.
