= List of Argentine films of 1998 =

A list of films produced in Argentina in 1998:

Argentine films of 1998
Title	Director	Release	Genre
A - C
5 pal' peso	Raúl Perrone	3 December	
Afrodita, el jardín de los perfumes	Pablo César	15 October	
Aller simple (Tres historias del Río de la Plata)	Noël Burch, Nadine Fischer and Nelson Scartaccini	2 July	
Asesinato a distancia	Santiago Carlos Oves	12 February	
Doña Bárbara	Betty Kaplan	14 May	
Buenos Aires me mata	Beda Docampo Feijóo	13 August	
Che... Ernesto	Miguel Pereira	1 October	
Cohen vs. Rosi	Daniel Barone	28 May	
Cómplices	Néstor Montalbano	8 October	
Corazón iluminado	Héctor Babenco	3 December	
Crónica de un extraño	Miguel Mirra	1 October	
La cruz	Alejandro Agresti	11 June	
D - L
Dársena Sur	Pablo Reyero	23 April	
El desvío	Horacio Maldonado	30 April	
Diario para un cuento	Jana Bokova	19 November	
Dibu 2, la venganza de Nasty	Carlos Galettini	2 July	
Escrito en el agua	Marcos Loayza	18 September	
El faro	Eduardo Mignogna	16 April	
Fuga de cerebros	Fernando Musa	2 April	
La herencia del tío Pepe	Hugo Sofovich	5 February	comedy
El juguete rabioso	Javier Torre	10 September	
M - R
Mala época	Nicolás Saad, Mariano De Rosa, Salvador Roselli and Rodrigo Moreno	31 December	
Mar de amores	Víctor Dínenzon	22 January	
Momentos robados	Oscar Barney Finn	2 July	
Montoneros, una historia	Andrés Di Tella	26 November	Documentary
La nube	Fernando E. Solanas	3 September	
Picado fino	Esteban Sapir	23 April	
Pizza, birra, faso	Bruno Stagnaro and Israel Adrián Caetano	15 January	
Plaza de almas	Fernando Díaz	4 June	
Los ratones	Francisco Vasallo	6 August	
S - Z
Secretos compartidos	Alberto Lecchi	7 May	
Sobre la tierra	Nicolás Sarquís	19 March	
La sonámbula, recuerdos del futuro	Fernando Spiner	24 September	
Sus ojos se cerraron	Jaime Chávarri	9 April	
Tango	Carlos Saura	6 August	
Tinta roja	Carmen Guarini and Marcelo Céspedes	19 March	
Un argentino en Nueva York	Juan José Jusid	21 May	
Un crisantemo estalla en cinco esquinas	Daniel Burman	7 May	

== See also ==
- 1998 in Argentina

== External links and references ==
- Argentine films of 1998 at the Internet Movie Database
