= List of Argentine films of 1991 =

A list of films produced in Argentina in 1991:

Argentine films of 1991
| Title | Director | Release | Genre |
A - Z
| El acompañamiento | Carlos Orgambide | 23 May | |
| Asalto y violación en la calle 69 | Pablo Bellini | | |
| Buen viaje | Fernando Musa | 19 December | |
| Chiquilines | Mario A. Mittelman | 14 March | |
| Delito de corrupción | Enrique Carreras | 3 October | drama |
| De regreso (El país dormido) | Gustavo Postiglione | 3 October | |
| Después de la tormenta | Tristán Bauer | 6 June | |
| Dios los cría | Fernando Ayala | 20 June | |
| Equinoccio, el jardín de las rosas | Pablo César | 11 April | |
| Extermineitors III, la gran pelea final | Carlos Galettini | 4 July | |
| Loraldia (El tiempo de las flores) | Oskar Aizpeolea | 16 May | acción |
| La noche eterna | Marcelo Céspedes and Carmen Guarini | 15 August | |
| La redada | Rolando Pardo | 29 August | |
| Las tumbas | Javier Torre | 8 August | |
| La última siembra | Miguel Pereira | 13 June | drama |
| El verano del potro | André Melançon | 31 January | drama |
| Viñateros de la costa | Jorge E. Degiuseppe | 7 November | |
| Vivir mata | Bebe Kamin | 30 May | |
| Ya no hay hombres | Alberto Fischerman | 17 May | |
