= Aphrodite, the Garden of the Perfumes =

- Spanish: Afrodita, el jardín de los perfumes
- Directed by: Pablo César
- Written by: Pablo César
- Based on: Theogony by Hesiod
- Starring: Issa Coulibaly
- Cinematography: Carlos Essmann; Carlos Ferro
- Edited by: Liliana Nadal
- Production companies: César Producciones; Centre National de Production Cinématographique (CNPC)
- Distributed by: Independent
- Release date: 15 October 1998 (Buenos Aires)
- Running time: 91 minutes
- Countries: Argentina; Mali
- Language: Invented language (Spanish subtitles)

Aphrodite, the Garden of the Perfumes (Spanish: Afrodita, el jardín de los perfumes) is a 1998 film written and directed by the Argentine independent filmmaker Pablo César, in the first co-production between Argentina and Mali. It is the final installment of the Trilogy of the Triumphs, a series that César began with Equinoccio, el jardín de las rosas (1991), filmed in Tunisia, and continued with Unicornio, el jardín de las frutas (1996), filmed in India. Both films made César the first Latin American filmmaker to shoot a co-production in Africa and the first Argentine director to do so with India.

The film transposes the Greek myth of Aphrodite, as told by Hesiod in the Theogony, to an ancient village in sub-Saharan Africa in an unspecified era, and features an all-black cast made up of African actors of various ethnicities and the Afro-Argentine Alejandro da Silva. Beyond this recontextualization, Aphrodite is embodied by a male actor (Issa Coulibaly), a sexual ambiguity that no character questions for almost the entire narrative. The film is spoken in an invented language combining the phonemes of Greek, Latin, Sanskrit and Classical Arabic.

Aphrodite, the Garden of the Perfumes premiered in Buenos Aires on 15 October 1998 and, the following year, competed at the Panafrican Film and Television Festival of Ouagadougou (FESPACO), in Burkina Faso, an unusual presence for a Latin American production at that festival. In the years after its release, the film has drawn the interest of scholars of African cinema, queer theory and postcolonial studies.

== Plot ==
An introductory narration traces the genealogy from Chaos, the infinite void from which everything originated, to Gaia, the personification of the Earth. Arising by her own power, Gaia engendered Uranus, the personification of the sky, without male intervention, and became the mother of the Titans, the youngest of them Cronus.

In a vast landscape of dunes, Cronus appears wielding a sickle with which he cuts off Uranus's testicles and casts them into the sea, in the hope that Aphrodite will be born. The next day, the Zephyrs find a naked young man sleeping on the shore and, convinced that it is the goddess, take her to meet the other gods. After marrying Hephaestus, Aphrodite seduces other gods and bears children whom she passes off as Hephaestus's; neither her husband nor her lovers question her sexual ambiguity. The three Horae accompany some moments of the narrative with dances.

To prove Aphrodite's infidelity, Hephaestus traps her with her lover in a bronze net and forces them to undress, finally revealing her male condition. Aphrodite declares that she acted according to her nature, that she gave the gods both pleasure and children, that the Zephyrs had mistaken her for a young woman, and that imagination is more powerful than reality. She accuses Hephaestus and his allies of hypocrisy and denounces the morality that these gods will pass on to the humans they are creating.

The Argonauts arrive in a camel caravan, dress Aphrodite in blue garments and lead her into the desert, where she is reunited with her seven children. After naming them all, she singles out Priapus, a lover of war, and cuts off his arms with a sickle so that he can see only the misery of the world. In the end, seated in the sand, Aphrodite declares that she will write this story in golden letters.

== Cast ==
- Issa Coulibaly as Aphrodite
- Alejandro da Silva as Ares
- Karamoko Sinayoko
- Fatoumata Coulibaly
- Hama Maiga
- Guibi Ouedraogo
- Sacko Kanté
- Yiriba Coulibaly

== Style and analysis ==
Aphrodite, the Garden of the Perfumes is, without any doubt, the culmination of the trilogy, through the birth of the new man, which gives rise to the apparently virtual or imaginary reality, as much as to the apparently tangible, objective reality.

— Pablo César, 1998.

Aphrodite, the Garden of the Perfumes is the final installment of the Trilogy of the Triumphs, a series that Pablo César began with Equinoccio, el jardín de las rosas (1991), filmed in Tunisia, and continued with Unicornio, el jardín de las frutas (1996), filmed in India. Both films made César the first Latin American filmmaker to shoot a co-production in Africa and the first Argentine director to do so with India. The series draws on the director's studies of mythology and Sufi texts, and introduces elements of sexual ambiguity. In various interviews of the period, César spoke of his "discovery" of African and Asian cinema in the 1980s as one of the reasons that led him to make co-productions. He also expressed his admiration for Pier Paolo Pasolini and Derek Jarman, and said he felt close to filmmakers such as the Senegalese Djibril Diop Mambéty, the Malian Souleymane Cissé and the Venezuelan Diego Rísquez. In an interview shortly before the release of Unicornio, el jardín de las frutas, in December 1996, César outlined the idea that would give rise to the final installment of the trilogy:

I believe that all of humanity has hit bottom. Dogmas and institutions have always been what halted the evolution of man. That is why Aphrodite, the Garden of the Perfumes, our next project, will speak of the birth of a new man, totally liberated. A society where everyone thinks and acts as they wish, without that utopian society necessarily meaning what some would call licentiousness. Precisely by letting people do as they wish, we are going to create a free society.

Like the other films of the trilogy, Aphrodite, the Garden of the Perfumes does not refer to any concrete Argentine or African reality, but instead takes place in an indeterminate space, removed from time and place. The film is spoken in an invented language, conceived to evoke a primordial language of antiquity. During production, César described it as "a product of the mixture of the phonemes of Greek, Latin, Sanskrit and Classical Arabic", and added: "As if they were phrases sung with the sweetness of the sounds of the aforementioned languages, in keeping with the essence of the project, the birth of the new man and of an alternative form of communication in the face of this apparently singular contemporary order." This device has been compared to that of Sebastiane (1976), by Jarman and Paul Humfress, whose dialogue in Latin likewise forces audiences to rely on the subtitles.

Aphrodite, the Garden of the Perfumes has been analyzed by scholars from queer and postcolonial perspectives. In Queer Issues in Contemporary Latin American Cinema, the American scholar David William Foster argues that the film first "queers" the classical narrative and then suggests, in a quite impressionistic way, a queer message. Foster centers his analysis on the fact that Aphrodite "shifts" from woman to man according to the desire of each lover, and distinguishes this case from the biological hermaphroditism studied by Michel Foucault and revisited by Eve Sedgwick. According to the author, the "feminization" of the body of the actor who plays Aphrodite manifests itself on both a narrative and a cultural level. From the narrative point of view, the camera lingers on Aphrodite's body during a cleansing ritual in which she is spied upon by Hephaestus, whose subsequent adoration of the body focuses on the actor's buttocks, which Foster reads as a homoerotic resemanticization of the male body. Furthermore, on a cultural level, the actor's hairless body breaks with the heterosexist model of Argentine cinema, which marks the binary difference through body hair, present in the male body and absent in the female. For Foster, the fact that Argentine culture fetishizes the white body makes the use of a black body to represent a classical Western myth all the more disruptive. The author concludes that the "queer agenda" is made explicit in the third part of the film, when Aphrodite, accused of adultery by Hephaestus and brought before the gods, defends the idea that sexuality is a matter of imagination. Although Aphrodite bears children with other gods, the mutilation she subsequently inflicts on Priapus also represents a refutation of heterosexual reproduction.

César's Afrodita is an ambiguous figure in portraying a female god in a male body, bearing children despite refuting the imperative to reproduce a human race that she sees as damned [...]. By refuting the heterosexism that is essential to the sanitizing of classical mythology as it is recycled by patriarchal interpretations of sexuality, César's Afrodita points toward something like a timeless mutability of desire that reinforces contemporary queer postulates about the limitless erotic possibilities of the human body. César achieves this effect in part through [...] distancing devices [...]: the radically foreign setting (at least for an Argentine film), the dominance on the sound track of the constant hum of the hot winds across the sand dunes, the use of a pseudolanguage, and [...] obligatory recourse to the subtitles as the only way of making sense of the dialogue.

— David William Foster, 2003.

Cypriot statuette of a "bearded Aphrodite" (c. 600–480 BC). Lieve Spaas sees in pieces like this one a precedent for androgynous representations of the goddess, but concludes that the black, male Aphrodite of the film has no precedent.

In her study of the film, published in Hermes and Aphrodite Encounters, the Belgian scholar Lieve Spaas argues that "to locate the birth of Aphrodite in a former African colony must be seen in terms of a colonial, postcolonial, and neocolonial discourse". For Spaas, the colonial situation, though absent from the narrative, is "the very fabric" on which the film is constructed, since César uses the Greek deities as "apt metaphors for the questioning of the polarization that the history of colonialism has enforced". She suggests that the film might belong to Third Cinema, as defined by the Ethiopian-American theorist Teshome Gabriel, although she voices reservations about that characterization given the stylized and metaphorical nature of the film, which operates on a level removed from time and space. Spaas argues that the choice of Mali does not respond to aesthetic reasons but to its historical status as a former French colony and a crossroads of the caravan routes, which gives it a strategic position on the continent's north–south and east–west axes.

The appearance of Aphrodite on the shores of Africa inevitably evokes the colonial invasion. Aphrodite's body, unexpectedly occupying an African territory, would be that of a male colonizer, but it is not recognized as male until the end of the film. However, from "the beginning of the colonial period till its end (and beyond)," Ania Loomba remarks, "female bodies symbolize the conquered land. This metaphoric use of the female body varies in accordance with the exigencies and histories of particular colonial situations." Is Aphrodite in the film at one and the same time the occupied territory and the occupier? The colonizer and the colonized?

— Lieve Spaas, 2004.

Drawing on authors such as Frantz Fanon, Homi K. Bhabha and Ania Loomba, Spaas holds that the film abandons the binary oppositions of Western thought—on which colonial oppression was structured—by fusing in Aphrodite the racial and the gender dichotomy, thereby revealing the fractured identities and hybridities generated by colonial dislocation. She concludes that, by transplanting the myth of Aphrodite to postcolonial Africa, the film reformulates Western mythical thought and calls into question Western perceptions of identity and of the world.

== Production ==
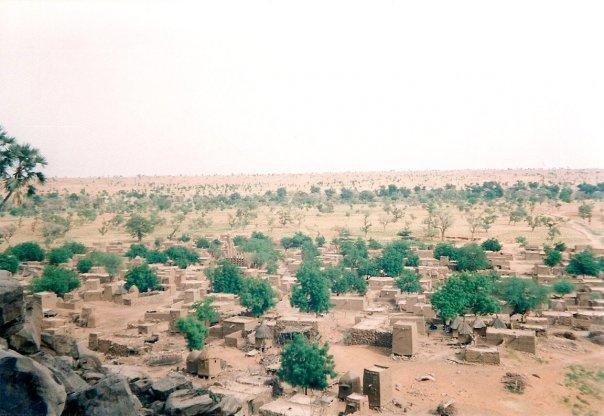
View of the Dogon country from the foot of the Bandiagara Escarpment, in Mali, 1998. Aphrodite, the Garden of the Perfumes was filmed there and in the city of Gao.

César flew to Mali on 31 January 1997 to scout the natural locations and meet the local filmmaker Cheick Oumar Sissoko, with whom he had already kept up an extensive correspondence about the possibility of co-producing a film in the country. The director traveled from the capital, Bamako, to Hombori, where Sissoko and his crew were shooting their film Genesis (1999), and during the meeting they agreed to carry out the first co-production between Argentina and Mali, through the Centre National de Production Cinématographique (CNPC). César held the casting of actors at the CNPC headquarters in Bamako, which about fifty people between 18 and 25 years old attended, and he also met with students of the Institut National des Arts (INA) in the city. During production, César recalled: "The selection of the Horae was, to cite one example, marvelous. I chose three young women, each belonging to a different ethnic group: from Sikasso, from Ségou and from Sangha. They had presented magnificent dances, completely different from one another and different among themselves." César chose to represent the Argonauts through a camel caravan of the Tuareg. Interviewed by Caras, he recounted: "Their bad reputation is entirely false. Although haggling with 30 armed men covered in sand—their faces veiled—over the price for them to include their caravans in the film is not something I would recommend to anyone."

Although before the shoot César announced his intention to film the seaside scenes—when Cronus casts his father's testicles into the sea and, the next day, the Zephyrs find the one they take for Aphrodite—on the Red Sea, in Eritrea, the film was ultimately shot entirely in Mali: in Na-Komo, a Dogon village near Sangha, by the Bandiagara Escarpment, and in the town of Gao, in the northeast. During the shoot, the crew lodged in huts and worked under high temperatures. Back in Argentina, César discovered that the reels corresponding to the beginning and the end of the film never reached their destination, and he therefore had to return to Mali to shoot those scenes again, urgently, ahead of the imminent rainy season. To cover the cost of the reshoot he needed to collect an installment of a loan from the National Institute of Cinema and Audiovisual Arts (INCAA) and, by his own account, went so far as to mortgage his office. In an interview with Clarín of 8 August 1998, he stated: "When we got here [to Argentina] we found that one of the parcels had gone missing, with 30% of the printed material. The airline says it will turn up, but since it still hasn't, I chose to go back there and film again. And since Argentine insurance doesn't cover those risks, I am more in debt than before."

== Release and reception ==
Aphrodite, the Garden of the Perfumes had its Argentine premiere on 15 October 1998 in Buenos Aires. The following year, the film competed at the Panafrican Film and Television Festival of Ouagadougou (FESPACO), in Burkina Faso, an unusual presence for a Latin American production at that festival.

The critic Michel Amarger, of the Burkinabè film magazine Ecrans d'Afrique, noted that "the camera captures a ballet of seduction and sadness" and observed that the story "questions above all human identity, follows the movements of black bodies and measures the course of the destiny that tests the characters". Amarger concluded that "by departing from conventions and myths, Pablo César seems to project himself into Mali to purify his gaze as a white filmmaker. An unconscious challenge that confers singularity on the film and shapes the contours of a story that, at times, proves hermetic". In La Nación, Diego Batlle opined that "it is very difficult not to approach this film from irritation, mockery or easy insult" and described it as "a product as exotic as it is soporific and disposable".

Later, in academic circles, David William Foster considered in 2003 that Aphrodite, the Garden of the Perfumes "was obviously made to counter the language of commercial filmmaking, and it is very competent and original in this regard". Lieve Spaas described it in 2004 as "a complex and disquieting film" and wrote:

The evocative and provocative language underwrites the strangeness of a film that does not allow for restful formulas of life but instills an anxiety that does not end with the film. As the viewers struggle to grasp the raison d'être of the [...] Aphrodite and to disentangle the web of labyrinthine crossings of the many deities, the visual beauty of the Mali village with its pointed dwellings, set in the yellow sand, entrances the viewers, leaving them in a stasis of endurance with the sound of the blowing wind.

== See also ==
- List of Argentine films of 1998
- List of Malian films

== Bibliography ==
- Bazán, Osvaldo (2004). Historia de la homosexualidad en la Argentina: de la conquista de América al siglo XXI (in Spanish). Buenos Aires: Marea Editorial. p. 385. ISBN 978-987-130-703-6 – via Google Books.
- Foster, David William (2003). Queer Issues in Contemporary Latin American Cinema. Austin: University of Texas Press. ISBN 0-292-70536-0.
- Manrupe, Raúl; Portela, María Alejandra (2003). Un diccionario de films argentinos II 1996-2002 (in Spanish). Buenos Aires: Editorial Corregidor. ISBN 950-05-1525-3.
- Pfaff, Françoise, ed. (2004). Focus on African Films. Bloomington: Indiana University Press. ISBN 978-025-321-668-7.
- Spaas, Lieve (2004). "Aphrodite and Colonial Politics: Pablo César's Film Afrodita: El Jardín de los Perfumes". In Zupančič, Metka (ed.). Hermes and Aphrodite Encounters. Birmingham, Alabama: Summa Publications. pp. 241–248. ISBN 978-188-347-944-2.
