= List of Argentine films of 1983 =

A list of films produced in Argentina in 1983:

== 1983 ==
1983
Title	Director	Date	Genre
A - F
El arreglo	Fernando Ayala	19 May	
Buenos Aires Rock	Héctor Olivera	20 January	musical
El búho	Bebe Kamin	30 May	
De las caras del espejo	Pablo César		
Deathstalker	James Sbardellati		adventure
El desquite	Juan Carlos Desanzo	August 4	drama
Diablito de barrio	Antonio Cunill	31 March	
Los enemigos	Eduardo Calcagno	18 August	drama
Espérame mucho	Juan José Jusid	11 August	drama
Los extraterrestres	Enrique Carreras	14 July	
Los fierecillos se divierten	Enrique Carreras	24 February	comedy
Francisco, flor y arcilla	Carlos Procopiuk	14 November	
G - Z
El grito de Celina	Mario David	26 May	
Hombres por hombres (en los subterráneos hacia la libertad)	Roberto Jorge Berardi	November	drama
Mercedes Sosa, como un pájaro libre	Ricardo Wullicher	6 October	
Mi tía Nora	Jorge Preloran		Drama
La muerte de Sebastián Arache y su pobre entierro	Nicolás Sarquís	17 March	
No habrá más penas ni olvido	Héctor Olivera	22 September	drama
El poder de la censura	Emilio Vieyra	31 April	
La República perdida	Miguel Pérez	1 September	documentary
Se acabó el curro	Carlos Galettini	1 September	
Superagentes y titanes	Adrián Quiroga	21 July	
Un hombre de arena	Mario Cañazares	4 August	
Un loco en acción	Enrique Dawi	5 May	
