= Jorge Goldenberg =

Argentine screenwriter

Jorge Goldenberg Hachero (born 1941) is a prolific screenwriter from Argentina.

Jorge Goldenberg was born in San Martín, Buenos Aires, Argentina in 1941. He studied film direction at the Film Institute of the National University of the Litoral in Santa Fe. He directed the documentaries Reportaje a un vagón (1963), Oficio (1966), co-directed the documentary Hachero nomás (1966) with Patricio Coll, Hugo Bonomo and Luis Zanger, and co-directed the documentary Regreso a Fortín Olmos (2008) with Patricio Coll.

Goldenberg has written several plays that have been staged in Argentina, other countries of Latin America and Europe, including Relevo 1923, Fifty-fifty, Poniendo la casa en orden, Knepp, Cartas a Moreno, Krinsky, La lista completa and Fotos de Infancias. He has also taught courses and led workshops on scriptwriting in several countries.

== Films ==
Jorge Goldenberg is credited as writer for:

- 1966 Hachero nomás (documentary short)
- 1971 Sebastián y su amigo el artista (TV movie)
- 1972 La nueva Francia
- 1975 Los Gauchos judíos
- 1976 Juan que reía
- 1976 No toquen a la nena
- 1977 Dear Comrades
- 1981 Sentimental (requiem para un amigo) (adaptation of the novel "Los desangelados")
- 1982 Plata dulce (Fernando Ayala)
- 1984 Otra esperanza
- 1984 Pasajeros de una pesadilla
- 1985 La película del rey (A king and his movie) (Carlos Sorín)
- 1986 Miss Mary (María Luisa Bemberg)
- 1986 Sostenido en La menor
- 1989 Eversmile, New Jersey
- 1990 La frontera (The Frontier) (Ricardo Larraín, Chile)
- 1993 De eso no se habla (I Don't Want to Talk About It) (dialogue) (María Luisa Bemberg)
- 1993 La estrategia del caracol
- 1994 Águilas no cazan moscas
- 1995 The Eyes of the Scissors
- 1996 Ilona llega con la lluvia
- 1997 El sueño de los héroes (Sergio Renán)
- 1997 El impostor (The Impostor) (Alejandro Maci)
- 1998 Enthusiasm
- 1998 Tinta roja (Red Ink) (Full-length documentary directed by Carmen Guarini)
- 2001 La Fuga (Eduardo Mignogna)
- 2001 Otilia Rauda
- 2002 Francisca (screenplay)
- 2002 Tarde en la noche (TV movie)
- 2002 The Place That Was Paradise
- 2003 The Southern Cross (Pablo Reyero)
- 2003 La tarara del chapao (Enrique Navarro, Spain)
- 2004 Perder es cuestión de método (The Art of Losing) (Sergio Cabrera, Colombia/Spain)
- 2005 Los nombres de Alicia
- 2006 Las alas de la vida (full-length documentary, directed by Antoni P. Canet, Spain)
- 2007 My Mexican Shivah (screenplay, based on the story Morirse está en hebreo by Ilan Stavans)
- 2008 Regreso a Fortín Olmos (Back to Fortin Olmos) (documentary – special mention at the 2008 Mar del Plata Film Festival)
