= Ciruelo Cabral =

Argentine fantasy artist

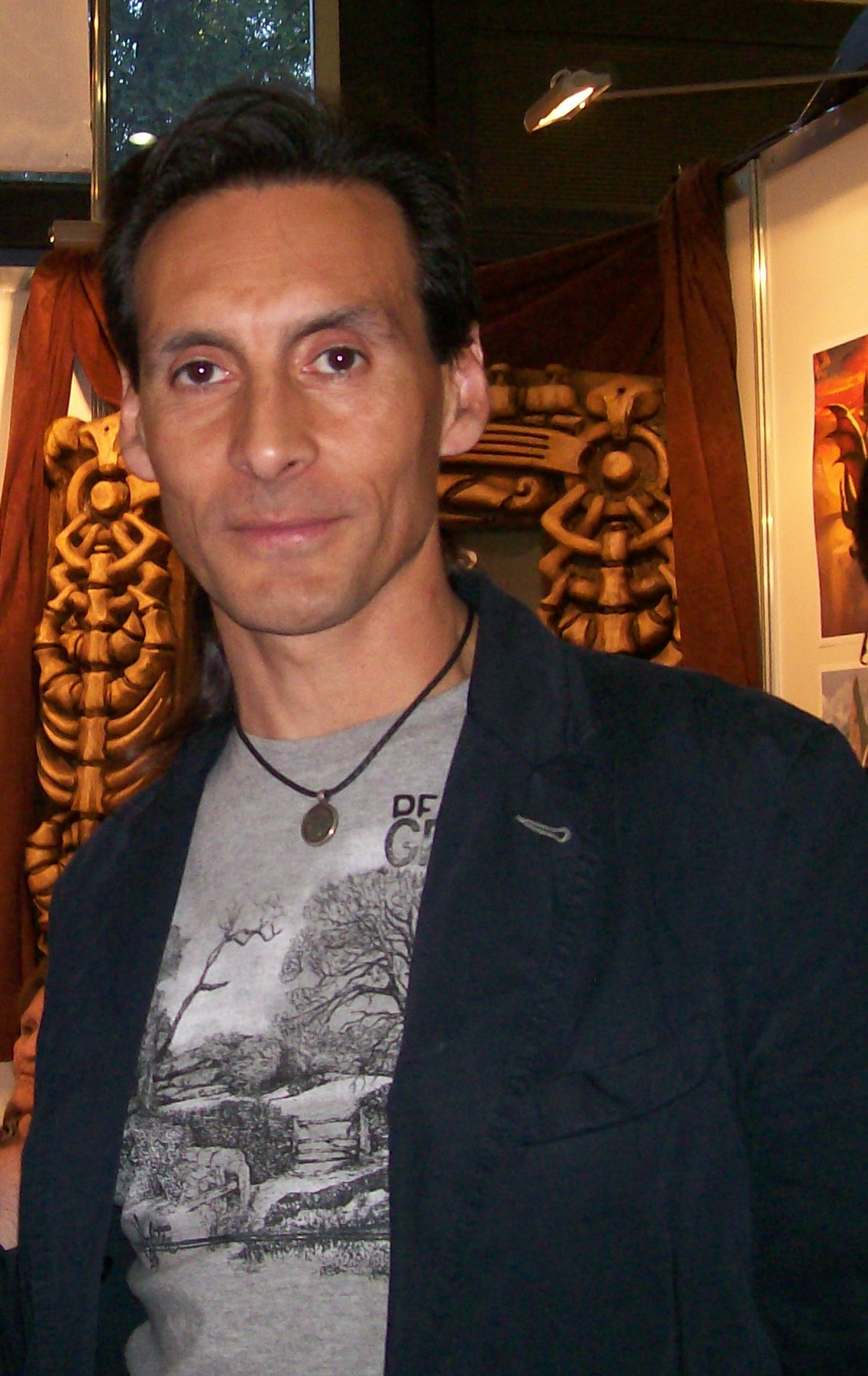
- Ciruelo Cabral in 2009
- Born: Gustavo Cabral; July 20, 1963 (age 63); Buenos Aires, Argentina
- Known for: Painting, illustration, entertainment design

Gustavo Cabral (born July 20, 1963), better known as Ciruelo ('plum tree'), is an Argentine fantasy artist, whose work focuses especially on dragons.

== Biography ==
Ciruelo Cabral was born in Buenos Aires, Argentina. He was born with color blindness. At age 13 Cabral enrolled in Instituto Fernando Fader, an art school, where he began his formal studies. He started working as illustrator at age 18 for a graphic advertising company, and soon after began doing comic covers. In 1987 he moved to Barcelona, Spain where he drew fantasy books' covers and inside drawings for Timun Mas, a publisher that specializes in the genre.

Cabral then widened his horizons and did work for companies around the world, including companies in the United States, Germany and Spain. He drew the covers of the Chronicles of the Shadow War, a Bantam trilogy written by George Lucas. He has also done music album covers, such as Steve Vai's The Seventh Song and The Flower King's Adam & Eve, and magazine covers for, among others, Playboy and Heavy Metal. His artwork can also be seen in some Magic: The Gathering cards.

Cabral uses mainly acrylic and oil painting, but also a number of other techniques, including his famous and distinctive paintings on rocks, which he created and calls "petropictos" (literally: stone paintings). He has published four books with his drawings: The Book of the Dragon (1990), Ciruelo (1990), Luz, the Art of Ciruelo (1997) and Magia, the Ciruelo Sketchbook (2000).

Ciruelo created the poster art for two Argentine films: Eliseo Subiela's classic Man Facing Southeast (1986) and the surrealist cult film Fuego gris (1994), written and directed by Pablo César. The art for Fuego gris was also used in Luis Alberto Spinetta's album of the same name, which was also the original soundtrack for the film.

Cabral's work is represented in the 2002 collection Paper Tiger Fantasy Art Gallery.
