= From the Faces of the Mirror =

- Spanish: De las caras del espejo
- Directed by: Pablo César
- Written by: Pablo César
- Starring: Kuno Haglund; Jorge Polaco; Cristina Clarasó
- Cinematography: Miguel César
- Release date: 1983
- Running time: 62 minutes
- Country: Argentina
- Language: Spanish

From the Faces of the Mirror (Spanish: De las caras del espejo) is a 1983 Argentine independent film written and directed by Pablo César in his feature-length debut, and starring Kuno Haglund, Jorge Polaco (who also served as assistant director) and Cristina Clarasó. It was shot on Super 8 film, a format César had worked with since his adolescence and with which he had already directed more than a dozen works in the independent short film scene of Buenos Aires.

In 1983, the film won first prize in the youth category of the Union Internationale du Cinéma (UNICA) and the best cinematography award at the Jornadas Argentinas de Cine No Profesional, organized by the Unión de Cineastas de Paso Reducido (UNCIPAR) in the city of Villa Gesell. In 1986, it was awarded the Bronze Medal at the 30th BFI London Film Festival and the Silver Palm at the 26th World Film Festival of Huy, in the Belgian city.

== Plot ==
A man of about sixty returns home after three decades away and reunites with his son, now thirty-five, who reproaches him for the affection he was denied during his childhood. The narrative is built around the protagonist's memories—his wife, the house, the scents of every corner—which lead him through states ranging from sweetness to anguish.

== Cast ==
- Kuno Haglund
- Jorge Polaco
- Cristina Clarasó

== Background and production ==
Pablo César took his first steps as a filmmaker in the independent short-film scene on Super 8. He made his first film, La diversión del rey (1975), at the age of 13, and by the early 1980s he had already directed more than a dozen short films. At the time, the only space dedicated to independent short film was the Unión de Cineastas de Paso Reducido (UNCIPAR), which held gatherings every Saturday at the Unione e Benevolenza headquarters in Buenos Aires. The first of his films to win awards was Del génesis (1980), which took first prize in the experimental category at the Ateneo Foto-Cine Rosario; an award for best editing and third prize (no category) at the Círculo de Cineastas Marplatenses competition; and a special mention at UNCIPAR.

From the Faces of the Mirror runs 62 minutes and stars Kuno Haglund, Jorge Polaco—who also served as assistant director—and Cristina Clarasó. In addition to being written and directed by César, it had cinematography by Miguel César, camera by Diego García, sound by Jorge López Retrivi, and the collaboration of Gloria César, Ana Rest and Jaco Rest.

== Screenings and awards ==
From the Faces of the Mirror did not have a commercial release. In 1983 it won first prize in the youth category of the Union Internationale du Cinéma (UNICA) and the best cinematography award at the Jornadas Argentinas de Cine No Profesional, organized by UNCIPAR in the city of Villa Gesell. In 1985, it was screened for the public alongside his short film Memorias de un loco at the Centro Cultural General San Martín, Buenos Aires. That same year, he presented From the Faces of the Mirror together with the short films Memorias de un loco and Ecce civitas nostra (co-directed with Jorge Polaco) at the Union of Cinematographers of Moscow, in the Soviet capital, later traveling to Kutaisi, Georgian SSR, to take part in the Film Festival for Children and Youth held by the Vladimir Lenin All-Union Pioneer Organization. In 1986, César screened From the Faces of the Mirror and several of his short films on a tour of Hungary, Czechoslovakia and the German Democratic Republic. That year, the feature was awarded the Bronze Medal at the 30th BFI London Film Festival and the Silver Palm at the 26th World Film Festival of Huy, in the Belgian city.

== See also ==
- List of Argentine films of 1983

== Bibliography ==
- Manrupe, Raúl; Portela, María Alejandra (2001). Un diccionario de films argentinos (1930-1995) (in Spanish). Buenos Aires: Corregidor. ISBN 950-05-0896-6 – via Internet Archive.
