= Thinking of Him =

Argentine film

Thinking of Him (Spanish: Pensando en él) is a 2018 film directed by the Argentine filmmaker Pablo Cesar. It delves into the relationship between the Nobel-winning Indian poet Rabindranath Tagore and the Argentine writer Victoria Ocampo, during the former's visit to Buenos Aires in the 1920s. The film stars Victor Banerjee as Tagore and Eleonora Wexler as Ocampo. It also features Raima Sen.

== Production ==
Initially the director thought to cast either Amitabh Bachchan or Nasiruddin Shah as Tagore. Later He decided to cast Banerjee.
