= El grito de Celina =

- Film poster
- Directed by: Mario David
- Written by: Mario David, Bernardo Kordon (short story)
- Produced by: Eduardo Thau (executive)
- Starring: María Rosa Gallo, Selva Alemán, Miguel Ángel Solá and María Vaner.
- Cinematography: Adelqui Camuso
- Edited by: Oscar Pariso
- Music by: Víctor Proncet
- Production company: Conosur Producciones
- Release date: 26 May 1983
- Running time: 75 minutes
- Country: Argentina
- Language: Spanish

El grito de Celina (Celina's Cry) is a 1983 Argentine romantic drama film directed by Mario David, who also wrote the script, which is based on a short story by Bernardo Kordon. It stars María Rosa Gallo, Selva Alemán, Miguel Ángel Solá and María Vaner. Víctor Proncet composed the soundtrack. The film was shot in 1975, but it didn't premiere until May 1983 due to military government disapproval and censorship at the time.

== Plot ==
A mother confronts the young woman who is going to marry her youngest son.

== Cast ==
- María Rosa Gallo as Juliana
- Selva Alemán as Celina
- Miguel Ángel Solá as Antonio
- María Vaner as Roberta
- Pablo Alarcón as Pedro
- Aldo Barbero as El hombre
- Alba Mujica as Rosalía
- David Llewellyn as Carancho
- Edith Gaute
- Juan Carlos de Seta as the drunkard
- Roberto Pieri as old man
- María Bufano as Hermana de Celina
- Sara Suter
- Ramón Perello as man in bar
- Jorge Ochoa
- Raúl Manso
- Tatiana Robi
- Roberto Doménico
- Eduardo Thau
- Patricia Luján
- Sergio Birnadussi
- Gabriel D. Lentini
- S. M. Birnadussi

== Production ==
The film was produced by executive producer Eduardo Thau. The screenplay was written by the director Mario David, based on the short story Los ojos de Celina by Bernardo Kordon. Cinematographer Adelqui Camusso was hired to shoot the film. Víctor Proncet composed the soundtrack, while the editing was done by Oscar Pariso.

== Reception ==
The film was shot in 1975 but because the content and actors were not to the liking of the military government at the time, the film was censored and blocked from release. It didn't reach cinemas in Buenos Aires until 26 May 1983. The film was critically acclaimed upon release, with Daniel López in La Voz del Interior labelling it "Kordon and David's remarkable speech on despotism". Hugo Paredero in Humor described the actors as "very talented, all deserving", surmising that they must have had "inner drama" to be so convincing to the camera. Jorge Miguel Couselo in Clarín described it as a "compelling movie" and stated that there are "no decorations". In their 2001 book Un diccionario de films argentinos (1930-1995), Raúl Manrupe and María Alejandra Portela were less favorable, writing: "Rural matriarchy, rustic beings and critical intention against authoritarianism, in a rather static and outdated realization".

== See also ==
- List of Argentine films of 1983
