= Tangos Are for Two =

- Theatrical release poster
- Spanish: Sus ojos se cerraron y el mundo sigue andando
- Directed by: Jaime Chávarri
- Screenplay by: Óscar Plasencia; Raúl Brambilla
- Produced by: Andrés Vicente Gómez
- Starring: Darío Grandinetti; Aitana Sánchez-Gijón; Juan Echanove
- Cinematography: Carles Gusi
- Music by: Luis María Serra; Rodolfo Mederos; Daniel Berardi
- Production companies: Rocabruno; Aurum Producciones; Patagonik Film Group
- Distributed by: Buena Vista International
- Release dates: 23 January 1998 (Spain); 9 April 1998 (Argentina)
- Countries: Spain; Argentina
- Language: Spanish

Tangos Are for Two (Spanish: Sus ojos se cerraron y el mundo sigue andando, lit. 'Their Eyes Closed and the World Goes On') is a 1998 Spanish-language drama film directed by Jaime Chávarri which stars Darío Grandinetti, Aitana Sánchez-Gijón and Juan Echanove.

== Plot ==
A Spanish couturier immigrates to Buenos Aires in the 1930s seeking to meet Carlos Gardel. There she meets Renzo, a look-alike of the latter.

== Cast ==
- Aitana Sánchez-Gijón as Juanita
- Darío Grandinetti as Renzo
- Juan Echanove as Gustavo
- Ulises Dumont
- José Soriano
- Carlos Carella

== Production ==
A Spanish-Argentine co-production the film was produced by Rocabruno, Aurum Producciones and Patagonik Film Group. The screenplay was penned by Raúl Brambilla, Óscar Plasencia whereas Rodolfo Mederos, Luis María Serra and Daniel Berardi were responsible for the music. Carles Gusi took over cinematography duties.

== Release ==
The film was theatrically released in Spain on 23 January 1998.

== Reception ==
Augusto Martínez Torres of El País deemed the film to be an "excellent musical" whose "great appeal lies in the skill with which Chávarri has managed to integrate 14 tangos into an intense and dramatic love" story.

The review in La Nación assessed the film to be "very good", considering that the director "masterfully handled this kind of complicit fable" (...) "springing from simple everyday things".

== Accolades ==
Year	Award	Category	Nominee(s)	Result	Ref.
1999	47th Silver Condor Awards	Best Actor	Darío Grandinetti	Won	
1999	47th Silver Condor Awards	Best Original Screenplay	Oscar Plasencia, Raúl Brambilla	Won	

== See also ==
- List of Argentine films of 1998
- List of Spanish films of 1998
