= The Southern Cross (film) =

2003 film

- Directed by: Pablo Reyero
- Written by: Gustavo Fontán; Jorge Goldenberg; Pablo Reyero
- Produced by: Javier del Pino; Pablo Reyero; Margarita Seguy
- Starring: Letizia Lestido
- Cinematography: Mariano Cúneo; Marcelo Iaccarino
- Edited by: Fabio Pallero
- Release date: 14 May 2003
- Running time: 87 minutes
- Country: Argentina
- Language: Spanish

The Southern Cross (Spanish: La cruz del sur) is a 2003 Argentine drama film directed by Pablo Reyero. It was screened in the Un Certain Regard section at the 2003 Cannes Film Festival.

== Cast ==
- Letizia Lestido - Nora
- Luciano Suardi - Javier
- Humberto Tortonese - Wendy
- Mario Paolucci - Rodolfo
- Silvia Baylé - Mercedes
- Oscar Alegre - Negro
