= Equinox, the Garden of the Roses =

1991 film by Pablo César

- Spanish: Equinoccio, el jardín de las rosas
- Directed by: Pablo César
- Written by: Pablo César
- Starring: Mohamed Gouider; Saida Nasri; Ahmed Hmaied; Walid Hafaied
- Cinematography: José Trela
- Edited by: Darío Tedesco
- Music by: Héctor Magni
- Production companies: César Producciones; Fédération Tunisienne des Cinéastes Amateurs (FTCA)
- Release date: April 11, 1991 (Buenos Aires)
- Running time: 73 minutes
- Countries: Argentina; Tunisia
- Language: Arabic

Equinox, the Garden of the Roses (Spanish: Equinoccio, el jardín de las rosas) is a 1991 Arabic-language film directed and written by Argentine independent filmmaker Pablo César as an international co-production with Tunisia. The film was shot between July and August 1990 in several Tunisian locations and made César the first Latin American to direct a co-production in Africa.

It is the first installment of the "Trilogy of Triumphs" (Spanish: Trilogía de los triunfos), a series within César's filmography that was followed by Unicorn, the Garden of Fruits (1996) and Aphrodite, the Garden of the Perfumes (1998). Inspired by ancient Sufi poetry and texts on various mythologies, Equinox, the Garden of the Roses tells the story of an angel who flies over five villages, with a different event arising in each one.

== Plot ==
An angel flies over five villages, and a different story unfolds in each of them.

== Cast ==
- Mohamed Gouider
- Saida Nasri
- Ahmed Hmaied
- Walid Hafaied

== Themes and style ==
Equinox, the Garden of the Roses is the first installment of the "Trilogy of Triumphs" (Spanish: Trilogía de los triunfos), a series within Pablo César's filmography that was followed by Unicorn, the Garden of Fruits (1996), filmed in India, and Aphrodite, the Garden of the Perfumes (1998), filmed in Mali. The film is inspired by the director's studies of mythology and by ancient Sufi poems, especially the works of Saadi, Hafez, and Omar Khayyam. Equinox, the Garden of the Roses marked a thematic shift from his previous feature film The Sacred Family (1988)—a satire about Argentina's last civil–military dictatorship—and presents a poetic style removed from commercial cinema.

== Production ==
César first visited Tunisia in 1989 as a guest jury member of the Festival International du Film Amateur de Kélibia, where he also presented his film The Sacred Family (1988) out of competition. Once the festival ended, the director was one of the signatories of the Manifesto for the Dissemination of the Independent Short Film, along with other filmmakers from the Americas, Africa, Europe, and Asia. The document urged the governments of the signatories' countries to more widely promote independent films in venues such as cinemas and television. César's experience in Kelibia encouraged him to return to Tunisia to shoot a film, and the following year he secured an international co-production with the Fédération Tunisienne des Cinéastes Amateurs (FTCA).

Interviewed by Al Jazeera in 2010, César stated that, in making the film, he "encountered strong opposition from those who could not accept the idea that the actors and technicians of an Argentine film would be Tunisian. But we resisted, made what we wanted, and laid the foundations for a new mode of co-production." He also recalled that the cultural centres of the Arab and Islamic community in Buenos Aires helped him get to know Tunisia better at that time.

Equinox, the Garden of the Roses was shot between July and August 1990 in the Tunisian towns of Mahdia, Chebba, Matmata, El Djem, and the island of Djerba, which made César the first Latin American to direct a co-production in Africa. Co-productions with African countries, as well as with India, would become a hallmark of his filmography. Equinox, the Garden of the Roses was edited and sound-mixed in Buenos Aires, and is spoken entirely in Arabic. In 2014, on the occasion of the film's screening at the fourth Latin American Arab Film Festival of Argentina, César recalled:

It was my first step into something I had not imagined would happen: co-productions with African nations. I remember when I entered the souk of Tunis. There was an arch at the entrance. On the way out I passed along the side without realizing it and stopped. I noticed I had come out through a different place, and then I wondered whether I had truly been able to leave that magnetizing universe.

== Release and reception ==
Equinox, the Garden of the Roses had its Argentine premiere on 11 April 1991 at the Premier cinema in Buenos Aires, the same month as the opening of the Embassy of Tunisia in the country. Interviewed by the newspaper La Prensa, the chargé d'affaires commissioned for the embassy's opening, Hassine Souki, stated: "Culture already unites us through an agreement signed in 1968 that has borne multiple fruits, the latest of which is cinema, through the recently announced co-production of Equinox, the Garden of the Roses, by Pablo César."

Critic Claudio España of La Nación highlighted César's "ability to develop a co-production beyond difficult borders" and his "decision not to resort to the visual and narrative models of traditional cinema", and concluded: "Equinox may not suit the taste of the viewer who only demands a film similar to one they have already seen. It appeals to those who seek from cinema a renewing and personal exploration of its language." César Magrini's review for El Cronista Comercial described the film as "visually a sustained poem, (...) filled with a strange and very captivating suggestiveness, derived as much from the subject as from its treatment, which is (...) markedly magical and poetic..." Writing for La Prensa, Amadeo Lukas noted that the film found the director "undoubtedly fascinated and dazzled by the Tunisian landscapes, customs, and culture", and described it as "a highly peculiar cinematic work". For his part, Paraná Sendrós of Ámbito Financiero opined that the film consisted of "beautiful images of Tunisia and nothing more".

== See also ==
- List of Argentine films of 1991
- Cinema of Tunisia

== Bibliography ==
- Foster, David William (2003). Queer Issues in Contemporary Latin American Cinema. Austin: University of Texas Press. ISBN 0-292-70536-0.
- Higbee, Will; Martin, Florence; Bahmad, Jamal (2020). Moroccan Cinema Uncut: Decentred Voices, Transnational Perspectives. Edinburgh University Press. ISBN 978-1-4744-7795-6 – via Google Books.
- Manrupe, Raúl; Portela, María Alejandra (2001). Un diccionario de films argentinos (1930-1995) (in Spanish). Buenos Aires: Corregidor. ISBN 950-05-0896-6 – via Internet Archive.
- Roof, María (2004). "African and Latin American Cinemas: Contexts and Contacts". In Pfaff, Françoise (ed.). Focus on African Films. Bloomington: Indiana University Press. pp. 257–261. ISBN 978-0-253-21668-7.
