= Eleonora Wexler =

Argentine actress

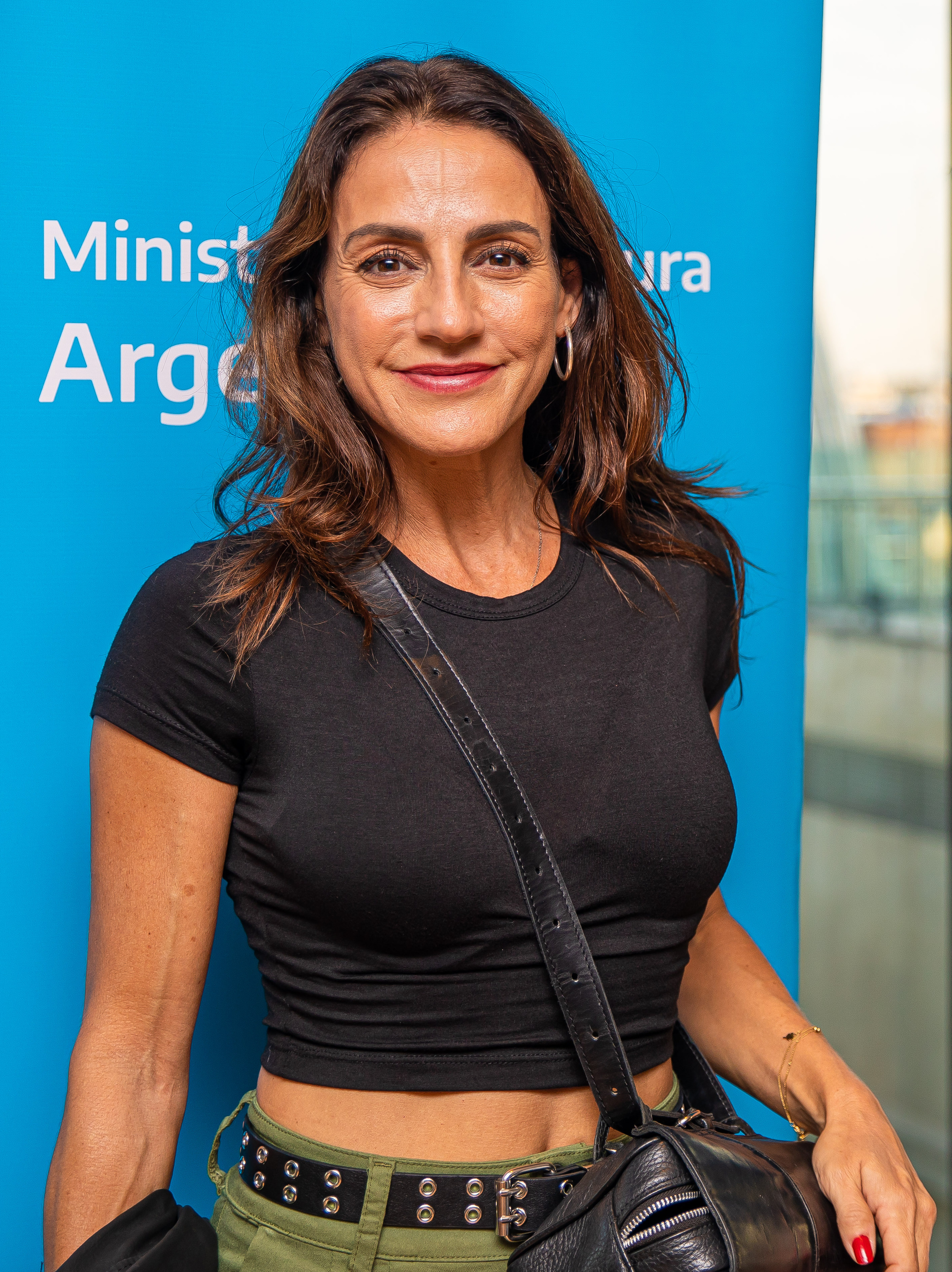
- photo by Mauro Rico; Ministerio de Cultura de la Nación
- Born: April 2, 1974 (age 51); Parque Patricios, Buenos Aires, Argentina
- Occupation: actress
- Years active: 1983-present
- Spouse: Leonardo Wassington (2000–2011)
- Children: Miranda Wassington (b. 2004)
- Awards: ACE Award for Best Actress in Dramatic Comedy; La Hija del Aire (2005); Martín Fierro Awards for Best Actress in Novel; Valientes (2009); Clarín Awards for Best Drama Actress; Valientes (2009)

Eleonora Wexler (born April 2, 1974, in Buenos Aires, Argentina) is an ACE Awarded Argentine actress, who started her career in Argentine version of the musical Annie, aged nine.

== Theatre ==
| Year | Title | Notes |
|---|---|---|
| 1983 | Annie | |
| 1984 | Cosa de Magia | |
| 1985 | Narices | |
| 1986 | Alta Sociedad | |
| 1989 | Frutillitas | |
| 1991 | El Zorro | |
| 1991 | Gipsy | |
| 1993 | Las Amistades Peligrosas | |
| 1996-1997 | Convivencia | |
| 2000-2001 | La Tempestad | |
| 2001-2002 | Hombre y Superhombre | |
| 2005 | La Hija del Aire | ACE Award |
| 2005 | La Profesión de la Señora Warren | |
| 2006 | Quien le teme a Virginia Woolf | |
| 2022 | Mary para Mary | |

== Films ==
| Year | Movie | Character | Director |
|---|---|---|---|
| 1986 | Te amo | Mariela | Eduardo Calcagno |
| 1988 | Documental educacional | | Carlos Galettini |
| 1991 | Rojo | | Paula Hernández |
| 1992 | Fuego gris | | Pablo César |
| 1995 | Geisha | Marisel | Eduardo Raspo |
| 1995 | El dedo en la llaga | Natalia | Alberto Lecchi |
| 1996 | Líneas de teléfono | | Marcelo Brigante |
| 1997 | Buenos Aires me mata | | Beda Docampo Feijóo |
| 1997 | La casa de Tourneur | | Jorge Caterbona |
| 2003 | La Mina | | Víctor Laplace |
| 2003 | El murmullo de las venas | | Sebastián D'Angelo |
| 2013 | Omisión | | Marcelo Páez Cubells |
| 2016 | Ataúd blanco | Ángela | Daniel de La Vega |
| 2016 | Amateur | Laura | Sebastián Perillo |
| 2018 | Pensando en él | | Pablo César |

=== Television ===
- Mesa de noticias (1984)
- Extraños y Amantes (1985)
- El Circo Más Gordo del Mundo (1985)
- Humor 5 Estrellas (1985)
- Venganza de Mujer (1986)
- Vínculos (1987)
- La Cuñada (1987)
- Su Comedia Favorita (1988)
- Plomera de mi Barrio (1988)
- Los Tuyos y los Míos (1989)
- Alta Comedia (1990)
- Estado Civil (1990)
- La Banda del Golden Rocket (1991–1992)
- El Club de los Baby Sitters (1993)
- Solo Para Parejas (1993)
- Inconquistable Corazón (1994)
- Alta Comedia (1994–1995)
- La Hermana Mayor (1995)
- Los ángeles no lloran (1996)
- El Garante (1997)
- Fiscales (1998)
- La Condena de Gabriel Doyle (1998)
- Como Vos y Yo (1998–1999)
- Los Médicos de Hoy 2 (2001)
- Ciudad de Pobres Corazones (2002)
- Tres Padres Solteros (2003)
- Los Simuladores (2003)
- Costumbres Argentinas (2003)
- Yendo de la Cama al Living (2004)
- Amor Mío (2005)
- Amor en custodia (2005)
- Amas de Casa Desesperadas (2006)
- Mujeres Asesinas (2006)
- Son de Fierro (2007–2008)
- Valientes (2009)
- Un año para recordar (2011)
- Condicionados (2012)
- Historia clínica (2013)
- Vecinos en Guerra (2013)
- Noche & Día (2014–2015)
- Amar después de amar (2017)
- La valla (2020)
- The Best Heart Attack of My Life (2025)

== Awards ==
- ACE Award for the Best Actress in Dramatic Comedy (La Hija del Aire) - WON

=== Nominations ===
- 2013 Martín Fierro Awards
  - Best actress of daily comedy (for Los vecinos en guerra)
  - Best actress of miniseries
