= Ania Loomba =

Indian literary scholar

- Born: August 7, 1955 (age 71); India
- Education: University of Delhi (BA, MA, MPhil); University of Sussex (PhD)
- Occupations: Literary scholar, professor
- Employer: University of Pennsylvania
- Known for: Colonialism/Postcolonialism; postcolonial studies; South Asian feminist studies; Renaissance race studies

Ania Loomba (born 7 August 1955) is an Indian literary scholar, public intellectual, and the Catherine Bryson Professor Emerita of English at the University of Pennsylvania. Her work focuses on colonialism and postcolonial studies, race and feminist theory, contemporary Indian literature and culture, and early modern literature.

== Early life and education ==
Loomba was born in August 1955 in the hill city of Shimla in India. She studied at the University of Delhi, where she received her BA, MA and MPhil degrees, before moving to England to study at the University of Sussex, where she received her PhD.

== Academic career ==
Loomba began her teaching career in India, first at the University of Delhi (1977-90) and Jawaharlal Nehru University (1990-99). She later held positions at the University of Tulsa (1992–93) and the University of Illinois, Urbana-Champaign (1999-2003), before joining the University of Pennsylvania in 2003. At Penn, she held the Catherine Bryson Chair in the Department of English and was affiliated with Comparative Literature, South Asian Studies, and Gender, Sexuality, and Women's Studies.

Loomba also taught at Stanford University as a Mellon Fellow (1993-95) and as a visiting professor at the University of Natal, Durban (1998), the Scandinavian Summer School of Literature and Literary Theory, University College of Karlskrona/Ronneby, Sweden (2000), University of California, San Diego (2004), University of Witwatersrand, Johannesburg (2010), and the School of Criticism and Theory at Cornell University (2012). She was a Global Professorial Fellow at Queen Mary University, London, from 2024-26.

== Scholarship ==
=== Gender, Race, Renaissance Drama (1989) ===
Her first book, Gender, Race, Renaissance Drama (Manchester University Press, 1989; Oxford University Press, 1992), examined the reading and performance of Renaissance theatrical texts by Shakespeare, Thomas Middleton, John Ford and others through the lens of race and colonialism. It shows, via sixteenth century theatre, history and culture, how gender relations and female identities changed in the period, and how these changes intersected with a growing awareness of cultural and racial difference. It connects representations of gender and race within Renaissance drama to the ways in which this drama was interpreted later during the colonial period. This book was the earliest full length study of two subjects that have become central to early modern scholarship—the interconnections between gender and race historically, and the place of Renaissance literature in colonial and postcolonial education. The book's "reinscription of early modern drama with the interlocking concerns of race, gender, and class" set an "agenda for an alternative practice of reading and teaching in India as well as in the west."

=== Colonialism/Postcolonialism (1998) ===
Her second book, Colonialism/Postcolonialism (Routledge, 1998; 2nd ed. 2005; 3rd ed. 2015), is a widely used introductory text in postcolonial studies, indicating "the widespread acceptance of post-colonial theory in the academic world and the growing interest in post-colonialism in general as a useful way to analyse changes in both the Third- and the First-World." The first edition highlighted the materialist roots of postcolonial studies, privileging it over colonial discourse analysis, and it was particularly noted for its strong analysis of the relationship between postcolonial nationalisms and feminisms. The third edition, released in 2015, added material on globalisation, indigenous peoples' struggles, temporality, and the relationship between premodern and contemporary forms of racism. Colonialism/Postcolonialism has been translated into Italian, Turkish, Korean, Indonesian, Japanese, Swedish, and Polish. Reviewers have described it as "essential reading for anyone with an interest in postcolonial studies" and "the best general introduction to the field."

=== Shakespeare, Race, and Colonialism (2002) ===
Shakespeare, Race, and Colonialism (Oxford University Press, 2002) examines England's early contacts with India, the Moluccas, and Turkey, situating Shakespeare's plays within the emerging history of global colonialism. Here, Loomba situated Shakespeare "between residual (feudal and classical) and emergent (capitalist) ideologies of race." By doing so, she revealed how "religious concepts of community were challenged most powerfully by differences in skin color, sparking off intense debates about the depths of religious identity as well as of blackness." Illustrating the period's concerns, Shakespeare's work reveals a shift from spiritual to bodily difference as "the very nerve center of changing views of race in the early modern period."

=== Revolutionary Desires (2018) ===
Her monograph Revolutionary Desires: Women, Communism and Feminism in India (Routledge, 2018) examines the lives of militant-nationalist and communist women in India from the late 1920s to the 1960s, when the communist movement fractured. Inspired by her own family's history within the Indian Communist Movement, the book uses memoirs, autobiographies, novels, documents, and interviews to trace how these women negotiated, and were constrained by, the gendered norms of Indian political culture. It showed how "these women created a unique communist space by questioning the conceptual bifurcation between the personal and the political and its critical engagement with otherwise neglected public spaces," crafting a distinct legacy for themselves apart from nationalist hierarchies within the Communist and feminist movements.

=== Edited Collections and Other Works ===
Loomba has produced many edited and co-edited volumes dealing with Renaissance literature and culture as well as modern South Asia during an academic career spanning more than three decades.

The first such volume was Postcolonial Shakespeares (with Martin Orkin; London and New York: Routledge, 1998), which emerged from a conference in South Africa after the fall of apartheid. Focused on the appropriations of Shakespeare in postcolonial contexts as varied as India, South Africa, and New Zealand, the book challenges the "colonizing role" of conservative and liberal scholarship in Shakespeare studies, posing "stark questions about the academic Shakespeare industry's investment in mechanisms of cultural power, prestige, and wealth from which it might otherwise seek to distance itself."

In 2005, she edited an influential volume of essays with Suvir Kaul, Antoinette Burton, Jed Esty and Matti Bunzl, Postcolonial Studies and Beyond (Duke University Press, 2005). This influential book emerged out of a landmark interdisciplinary conference at the University of Illinois, Urbana-Champaign. It brought together scholars of literary studies, history, anthropology, Asian and African studies, religious studies and political science, and discussed the field’s relationship to work in Latin America, East and South Asia, the Middle East, and the United States. The volume's essays respond to the historical development and consolidation of postcolonial studies in U.S. and British universities since the 1970s amid the forces of accelerating neoliberalism, while pointing to new directions in the field, reasserting "a certain historical agency that may have been leached from postcolonial studies during its period of theoretical refinement and institutional consolidation." The volume highlighted the continued urgency of postcolonial studies in the face of the rise of globalization studies which obscured the endurance of colonial relations between and within the Global North and South.

In 2007, her book Race in Early Modern England: A Documentary Companion (co-edited with Jonathan Burton; Palgrave, 2007) brought together both well-known and rare extracts from classical, medieval and early modern travel writings, medical texts, statutes, dictionaries, recipes, atlases, emblem books, the Bible, religious commentaries, pamphlets, scientific tracts, and philosophical treatises to demonstrate the range and complexity of sixteenth- and seventeenth-century thinking about racial difference. The book uses this diverse archive to challenge conventional histories and theories of race, arguing that ideas about race were not always or exclusively tied to skin color or bodily phenotypes, and how religious difference was crucial to their development.

In 2011, Loomba produced a critical edition of Shakespeare's Antony and Cleopatra (Norton, 2011). This edition brought together sources from antiquity to the early modern period that inspired Shakespeare's worldview and writing as well as the performance history and critical reception of his play during the four subsequent centuries, continuing into the modern era.

In 2012, she published South Asian Feminisms (co-edited with Ritty A. Lukose; Duke University Press, 2012). This book presented recent interventions into key areas of feminist scholarship, activism and politics in India, Pakistan, Bangladesh and Sri Lanka, focusing on the relationship between women's movements, religion and secularism, globalization and gendered labor, and law and sex work. Essays showed how feminists have had to seriously rethink their approaches to sexuality, labor, and the law in recent years, moving beyond "the tropes of empire, nation, and community."

Loomba and co-editor Melissa Sanchez received the Society for the Study of Early Modern Women's Collaborative Book Prize for Rethinking Feminism in Early Modern Studies. This volume challenged the perception that feminist criticism was in decline, and brought together scholarship that repositions gender as inseparable from race and sexuality in the study of the early modern period.

In 2018, her edited collection, Cultural History of Western Empires in the Renaissance was published as the third volume in Bloomsbury's six-volume Cultural History of Western Empires series. The essays in this volume "show how European contact with Asia, the Americas and Africa spurred innovations in warfare, seafaring, and accounting," documenting how "Renaissance culture, in all its diversity and dynamism, was both the midwife of empire and its progeny."

Loomba was co-series editor (with David Johnson of the Open University) of Postcolonial Literary Studies (Edinburgh University Press). This series published volumes dealing with the ways colonial contact shaped literature in different period, ranging from the medieval to the present day.

In addition, Loomba has published over 50 essays which address Renaissance Literature, early modern global contact, race and embodiment, caste and racial philosophy, and race in modern India. Loomba has also written several influential articles on widow immolation, Indian feminism, and postcolonial theory. These articles, as well as two co-edited collections--On India: writing history, culture, postcoloniality (special issue of Oxford Literary Review 1994) and the previously mentioned Postcolonial Studies and Beyond (Duke University Press 2005)-—engaged with scholarship and political movements in India and elsewhere to question representations of the so-called Third world in the Anglo-American academy.

== Awards and honours ==
In 2022, Loomba was selected to receive the Charles Homer Haskins Medal from the American Council of Learned Societies (ACLS), one of the most distinguished honours in the American humanities, recognising a lifetime of contribution to humanistic learning. She delivered the Haskins Prize Lecture at the ACLS Annual Meeting in Baltimore on 3 May 2024.

== Political and public engagement ==
Loomba has been active in movements for gender and for social equality. She worked with the National Federation of Indian Women in New Delhi in campaigns against dowry murders and sexual violence against women. At Delhi University, she was part of the faculty who worked to spread consciousness on these issues. While on its faculty, she helped set up Jawaharlal Nehru University’s Gender Sensitisation Committee Against Sexual Harassment, the first such university organization in India, and one recognized by legal experts as a model of its kind. She has written several articles on this process, and on the subsequent attacks on this committee, as well as more generally on sexual violence and the feminist movement in India.

At the University of Pennsylvania, Loomba has been an active supporter of several local movements, drafting a solidarity statement in solidarity with the Occupy Wall Street movement, signed by dozens of Penn faculty members, and joining movements for a fairer financial deal for students in the country. She has supported various student movements on campus--against fossil fuels, against the displacement of poor families in West Philadelphia, Philadelphia, for freedom of speech on campus, and graduate worker unionization.

Loomba has long supported the movement for a free Palestine, and against the funding of Israel by US universities and government. In September 2023, Loomba was among 36 Penn faculty members who signed an open letter published in The Daily Pennsylvanian expressing support for the Palestine Writes Literature Festival and responding to a statement by Penn's president Liz Magill that had raised concerns about antisemitism associated with certain festival speakers. The faculty letter argued that the president's statement equated criticism of Israeli government policy with antisemitism, and raised broader concerns about academic freedom.

In November 2023, Loomba was among more than 1,200 signatories to a statement published on Jadaliyya, titled "Feminists for a Free Palestine," which called for an end to what the signatories described as a genocide in Gaza and the Israeli occupation of Palestine. The statement was signed by scholars in feminist, queer, and trans studies. It affirmed opposition to colonialism, military occupation, and ethnic cleansing, and committed its signatories to resisting the suppression of academic freedom on university campuses.

In May 2024, Loomba published an essay in support of the Gaza Solidarity Encampment at the University of Pennsylvania, in which she called on the university to disclose its financial holdings and to amend its investment policy to divest from companies she argued were profiting from Israel's military operations in Gaza and the occupation of Palestinian territories.

== Selected bibliography ==
- Gender, Race, Renaissance Drama (1989)
- Colonialism/ Postcolonialism (1998)
- Post-colonial Shakespeares (1998) (co-editor)
- Shakespeare, Race, and Colonialism (2002)
- Postcolonial Studies and Beyond (2005) (co-editor)
- Race in Early Modern England: A Documentary Companion (2007) (co-editor)
- Antony and Cleopatra (critical edition; Norton, 2011)
- South Asian Feminisms (2012) (co-editor)
- Rethinking Feminism in Early Modern Studies: Gender, Race and Sexuality (2016) (co-editor)
- Revolutionary Desires: Women, Communism and Feminism in India (2018)
- A Cultural History of Western Empires in the Renaissance (2018) (co-editor)
