= Carmen Guarini =

Argentine anthropologist, teacher, film maker

- Born: 18 January 1953 (age 73)
- Known for: visual anthropology
- Scientific career
- Institutions: Fundación Universidad del Cine, University of Buenos Aires, Cine Ojo

Aurelia Del Carmen Guarini (born 18 January 1953) is an Argentine anthropologist, teacher, film director, and film producer specializing in anthropological documentary films. She teaches visual anthropology and directs documentaries in Argentina (Fundación Universidad del Cine; University of Buenos Aires; Observatorio Escuela de Cine Documental) and in Cuba. She serves on the documentary projects' evaluation committee at the National Institute of Cinema and Audiovisual Arts and participates in Cine Ojo projects.

== Biography ==
Guarini earned her Ph.D. at the Paris West University Nanterre La Défense. She studied anthropological film under the direction of Jean Rouch in 1988 and had specialized seminars with Fernando Birri, Jean Louis Comolli, and Jorge Prelorán. She is a researcher at CONICET, and professor of Visual Anthropology at the University of Buenos Aires. She also teaches courses at the Film Centre and the International Film and Television School, a school of audiovisual media in San Antonio de los Baños, Cuba, and has been a visiting professor in France and Spain. With Marcelo Céspedes, she founded the production company Cine Ojo (1986) and the Festival y Forum DocBuenosAires (2001). She worked as a producer with many Argentine directors, including Andrés Di Tella, Mouján Alejandro Fernandez, Pedro Fernandez Mouján, Jorge Goldenberg, Edgardo Cozarinsky, Cristian Pauls, and Sergio Wolf. For her work in film, Guarini has won prizes at major national and international festivals.

== Filmography ==
=== Director ===
- Walsh entre todos (2015)
- Calles de la memoria (2012)
- D-Humanos ("Baldosas en Buenos Aires"), (2011)
- Gorri (2010)
- Meykinof (2005)
- El diablo entre las flores (short film) (2004)
- H.I.J.O.S., el alma en dos (2002)
- Compañero Birri) (unpublished) (2001)
- Tinta roja (1998)
- Jaime de Nevares: Último viaje (1995)
- En el nombre de la seguridad nacional (1994)
- Historias de amores semanales (1993)
- La voz de los pañuelos (short film) (1992)
- La noche eterna (1991)
- A los compañeros la libertad (short film) (1987)
- Buenos Aires, crónicas villeras (1986)

=== Production ===
- Walsh entre todos (2015)
- Calles de la memoria (2012)
- Gorri (2010)
- Madres con ruedas (2006)
- Los perros (2004)
- La televisión y yo (notas en una libreta) (2002)
- Por la vuelta (2002)
- El siglo del viento (1999)
- Buenos Aires, crónicas villeras (1986)

=== Executive producer ===
- Walsh entre todos (2015)
- Saldaño. El sueño dorado (2014)
- Sangre de mi sangre (2014)
- Regreso a Fortín Olmos (2008)
- Pulqui, un instante en la patria de la felicidad (2007)
- Fotografías (2007)
- Bialet Massé, un siglo después (2006)
- Murgas y murgueros (2003)
- El tiempo y la sangre (2004)
- Prohibido dormir (2004)
- Yo no sé qué me han hecho tus ojos (2003)
- H.I.J.O.S., el alma en dos (2002)
- Tango deseo (short film) (2002)
- Yo, Sor Alice (2001)

=== Associate producer ===
- Liniers, el trazo simple de las cosas (2010)

=== Production management ===
- Ronda nocturna (2005)

=== Camera ===
- Walsh entre todos (2015)
- Calles de la memoria (2012)
- H.I.J.O.S., el alma en dos (2002)

=== Sound ===
- La voz de los pañuelos (short film) (1992)

=== Screenwriter ===
- Walsh entre todos (2015)
- Calles de la memoria (2012)
- Cuentas del alma. Confesiones de una guerrillera (2012)
- Gorri (2010)
- Meykinof (2005)
- H.I.J.O.S., el alma en dos (2002)
- Tinta roja (1998)
- Jaime de Nevares: Último viaje (1995)
- Historias de amores semanales (1993)
- A los compañeros la libertad (short film) (1987)
- Hospital Borda: un llamado a la razón (1986)
- Buenos Aires, crónicas villeras (1986)

=== Photography ===
- Walsh entre todos (2015)
- Calles de la memoria (2012)
- Gorri (2010)
- Meykinof (2005)
- Por la vuelta (2002)
- H.I.J.O.S., el alma en dos (2002)

=== Montage ===
- Walsh entre todos (2015)
- Madres con ruedas (2006)
- Por la vuelta (2002)
- H.I.J.O.S., el alma en dos (2002)
- Tinta roja (1998)

=== Text ===
- Calles de la memoria (2012)
- Jaime de Nevares: Último viaje (1995)

=== Creation ===
- Ronda nocturna (2005)

=== Art direction ===
- Espejo para cuando me pruebe el smoking (2005)

== Awards ==
- 1995, Special mention, Organización Católica Internacional del Cine
- 2000, Special mention, Festival Internacional de cine documental, cortometrajes y animación, Bombay, India
- 2001, Konex Award
- 2002, Special mention, Havana Film Festival
- 2006, candidate, Argentine Film Critics Association
- 2011, Konex Award
- Special mention, FIPRESCI

== Bibliography ==
- Manrupe, Raúl; Portela, María Alejandra (2001). Un diccionario de films argentinos (1930-1995) (in Spanish). Buenos Aires: Editorial Corregidor. ISBN 950-05-0896-6.
- Manrupe, Raúl; Portela, María Alejandra (2003). Un diccionario de films argentinos II 1996-2002 (in Spanish). Buenos Aires: Editorial Corregidor. ISBN 950-05-1525-3.
- Manrupe, Raúl; Portela, María Alejandra (2010). Un diccionario de films argentinos III 2003-2009 (in Spanish). Buenos Aires: Editorial Corregidor.
- Ministerio de Cultura (2009). Cine Argentina - Estéticas de la Producción (in Spanish). Government Ciudad de Buenos Aires. GGKEY:JR8WSRBZ6WF.
- Mor, Jessica Stites (1 May 2012). Transition Cinema: Political Filmmaking and the Argentine Left Since 1968. University of Pittsburgh Press. ISBN 978-0-8229-7797-1.
- Reale, Victoria (3 July 2013). "Carmen Guarini: "La memoria no es una identidad única"". Suplemento “Ñ” del 3 de julio de 2013- (in Spanish).
- "Carmen Guarini" (in Spanish). Foundation Konex.
