= Pablo Reyero =

Argentine film director and screenwriter (born 1966)

- Born: 29 March 1966 (age 60); Buenos Aires, Argentina
- Occupations: Film director Screenwriter
- Years active: 1998-present

Pablo Reyero (born 29 March 1966) is an Argentine film director and screenwriter. He has directed three films since 1998. His film La cruz del sur was screened in the Un Certain Regard section at the 2003 Cannes Film Festival.

== Filmography ==
- Dársena sur (1998)
- La cruz del sur (2003)
- Angeles caídos (2007)
