= List of Argentine films of 1994 =

A list of films produced in Argentina in 1994:

Argentine films of 1994
Title	Director	Release	Genre
A - Z
El amante de las films mudas	Pablo Torre	29 September	
Amigomío	Jeanine Meerapfel and Alcides Chiesa	9 June	
La balada de Donna Helena	Fito Páez		mediometraje
Cortázar	Tristán Bauer	21 October	
Chamuyando	Raúl Perrone	mayo	
Convivencia	Carlos Galettini	21 April	
Cuerpos perdidos	Eduardo de Gregorio	8 September	
Despertar de pasiones	Omar Pini	1 September	
Fuego gris	Pablo César	25 August	
Golpes a mi puerta	Alejandro Saderman	1 September	
Guerreros y cautivas	Edgardo Cozarinsky	10 November	
Labios de churrasco	Raúl Perrone	3 July	
La memoria del agua	Héctor Faver	18 August	Drama
El próximo enemigo	Robert Young	1 December	
Una sombra ya pronto serás	Héctor Olivera	5 May	Drama

== External links and references ==
- Argentine films of 1994 at the Internet Movie Database
