= Pablo César =

Argentine filmmaker

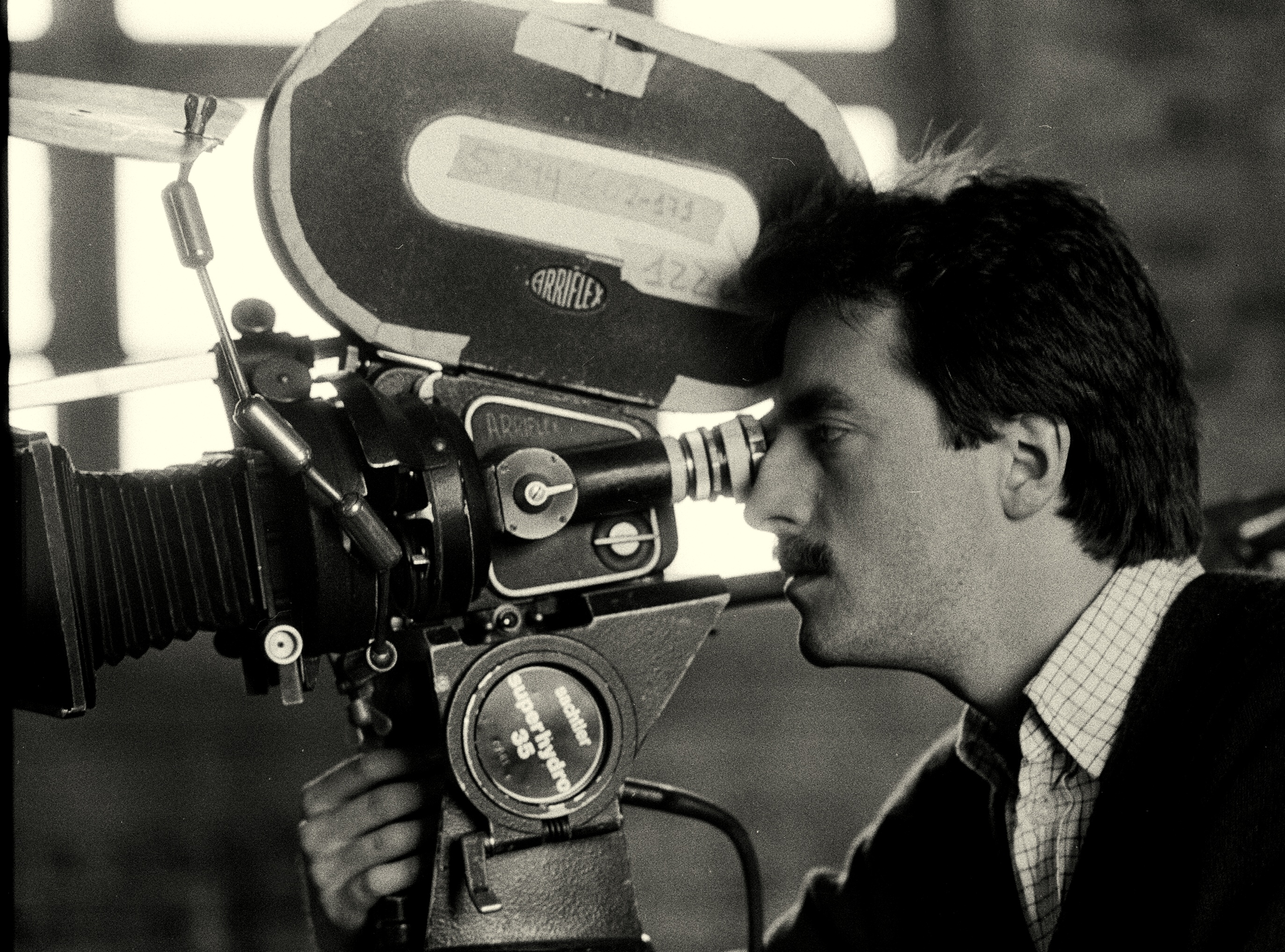
- César during the filming of La sagrada familia (1988), his first feature film shot in the 35 mm format
- Born: 26 February 1962 (age 64); Buenos Aires, Argentina
- Occupations: Film director; film producer; screenwriter; film professor
- Years active: 1975–present
- Known for: Being the first Argentine filmmaker to direct co-productions with India and countries from the African continent.

Pablo César (pronounced [ˈpaβlo ˈsesaɾ]; born 26 February 1962) is an Argentine film director, film producer, screenwriter and film professor. He began his filmmaking career in the Buenos Aires independent short film scene shot in the Super 8 format, making more than twenty works between the 1970s and 1980s, among which Del génesis (1980), Ecce civitas nostra (1984)—co-directed with Jorge Polaco—and Memorias de un loco (1985) stand out. In 1983, César directed his first feature film De las caras del espejo, shot in Super-8. He turned to the 35 mm film format from his second feature onwards, La sagrada familia (1988), an ironic film that works as a critique of the abuse of power, as well as an allegory of the era of the last civic-military dictatorship in Argentina.

César has been a pioneer in developing co-productions between his country and nations in Africa and South Asia. He is the first Argentine director to film co-productions with India, and the only Latin American filmmaker who has directed co-productions with African countries, among them Tunisia, Benin, Mali, Angola, Namibia, Ethiopia, Morocco and Ivory Coast. His first co-productions were the so-called "trilogy of triumphs", inspired by ancient Sufi poems and texts on different mythologies. It is formed by the films Equinoccio, el jardín de las rosas (1991), Unicornio, el jardín de las frutas (1996) and Afrodita, el jardín de los perfumes (1998), filmed in Tunisia, India and Mali, respectively.

In 1994, he released Fuego gris, a film with no dialogues that features 17 original compositions by Luis Alberto Spinetta, the only soundtrack in the musician's career. It was followed by the films Sangre (2003)—in which he veered towards a more realistic and autobiographical style— and Hunabkú (2007), shot in El Calafate and the Perito Moreno glacier. César continued to make co-productions on the African continent throughout the 2010s, filming Orillas (2011) in Benin, Los dioses del agua (2014) in Angola and Ethiopia, El cielo escondido (2016) in Namibia, and El llamado del desierto (2018) in Morocco. His film Pensando en él (2018) was the second co-production between Argentina and India, and depicts the meeting between Rabindranath Tagore and Victoria Ocampo in 1924. In 2020 he released El día del pez—the first co-production between Argentina and Ivory Coast—which closes a trilogy formed together with Los dioses de agua and El cielo escondido. His most recent film is the documentary Macongo, la Córdoba africana (2023), in which he explores the African roots in the Argentine province of Córdoba. César is currently in post-production on two films shot in 2023: Historia de dos guerreros, a love story between two men in the world of mixed martial arts, and Después del final, biopic about artist and gallery owner Luz Castillo.

César's work—entirely produced in film format— is considered an exponent of independent and auteur cinema, characterized by its poetic, symbolic and contemplative use of the cinematographic language. The content of his films is influenced by his studies on the mythology, ethnology and ethnography of various countries, exploring themes such as postcolonialism, the legacy of African philosophy and cosmogony, the ties between the East and the West, the impact of the Afro-descendant community in Argentina, and the challenging of the traditional representations of Africa and India. In 2023, Página/12 described him as the "only Latin American film director who has dedicated more than 20 years to dealing with African themes." César is a proponent of the so-called "South-South Cooperation" (Spanish: Cooperación Sur-Sur), promoting modes of production, distribution and dissemination of films from the Global South that contrast with the mainstream trends. He has been awarded at various film festivals throughout his career, including the BFI London Film Festival, the Huy Film Festival, the Figueira da Foz International Film Festival, the Amiens International Film Festival, and the NiFF Houston Int'l Film Festival. He has been a jury member of several international festivals, including the International Film Festival of India (in 2007 and 2021), the Kélibia International Film Festival, the Carthage Film Festival, the Panafrican Film and Television Festival of Ouagadougou, the Amiens International Film Festival and Montreal's Festival du nouveau cinéma. César has been a university professor at Buenos Aires' Universidad del Cine since 1992, being one of the first teachers of the institution.

== Life and career ==
=== 1962–1982: Early life and beginnings in the Super 8 format ===
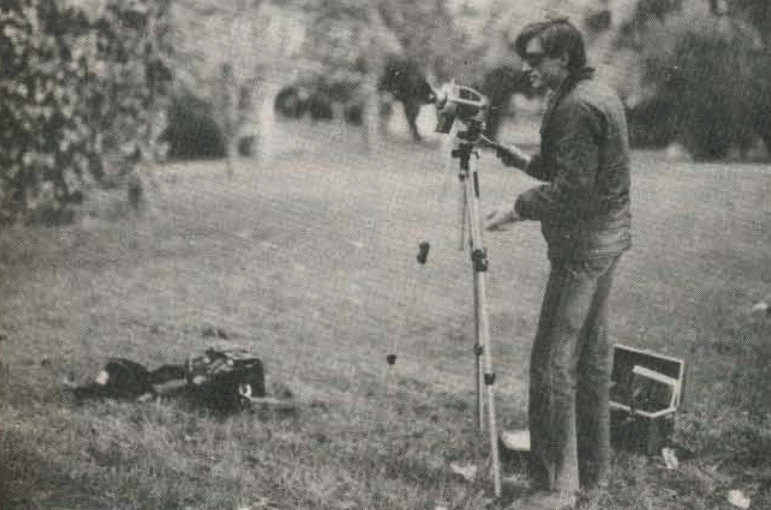
César filming with a Super 8 camera in 1981.

Pablo César was born on 26 February 1962 in Buenos Aires, Argentina. At age 6, he began to make comic books, learning through a mail course as there were no schools where to train. Between the ages of 10 and 13, César edited the Patatus newsletter, selling it at his primary school and even at some local newsstands. In 1975, his older brother José gave him a Super 8 film camera and, since then, he constantly recorded family scenes for two years. Four years later, José died in an accident. In a 2017, César noted the significance of that gift:

It allowed me many things because my adolescence was stolen by the dictatorship, I was 12 years old and a few months after my brother gave me the camera, at the end of 1975, the country was transformed and that was a weapon where I turned my dreams, my nightmares. With all the ignorance on how to narrate a film, since everything was prohibited, there were no film schools, except for the one in Avellaneda, but during 1979 my mother did not want me to travel there because they stopped you all the time, there was nothing, you had to go out and film.

César took his first steps as a filmmaker in the independent short film scene shot in Super-8. Encouraged by his brother José, he made his first short film La diversión del rey (8-minute animation) in 1975, at the age of 13. In 1977, he filmed 7 titles: Lúgubre venganza (7-minute fiction), Aventuras en el reino (12-minute animation), El espiritista (45-minute fiction), El caso Mandrox (15-minute fiction) and El medallón (12-minute fiction). In 1979, he shot Objeto de percepción (12-minute fiction), La máquina (18-minute fiction), La viuda negra (15-minute fiction), Itzengerstein (18-minute fiction) and La visión de Ezequiel (10-minute fiction).

In those years it was not easy to film in the street, so César resorted to parks or holiday houses. In addition, the only space that existed dedicated to independent short films was the Unión de Cineastas de Paso Reducido (UNCIPAR), which each Saturday organized meetings at the headquarters of Unione e Benevolenza, in Buenos Aires. There, film debates took place and some short films were screened, of which one was voted to be in the finals. César's first film to compete in the UNCIPAR contest was La máquina, followed by Itzengerstein.

In 1980, he directed the films Apocalipsis (7-minute experimental film), Del génesis (8-minute fiction-experimental film) and Black Sabath (16-minute fiction). Del génesis was the first film with which César began to win awards. In 1980, he won first prize in the experimental category of the Ateneo Foto-Cine Rosario, a mention for best editing and third prize (without category) in the Mar del Plata Filmmakers Circle contest, and a special mention in UNCIPAR. In 1981, Black Sabbath was exhibited at the meeting of the International Union of Amateur Cinema (UNICA).

=== 1983–1989: De las caras del espejo and La sagrada familia ===
César made his first feature film, De las caras del espejo (shot in Super 8), in 1983. The film won first prize in the youth category at UNICA. That same year, De las caras del espejo also received the prize for Best Photography at the Jornadas Argentinas de Cine No Profesional, carried out by UNICPAR in the city of Villa Gesell. In 1986, he studied Semiology and Semiotics of Cinema at the University of Paris VIII in Saint-Denis, France.

In 1985, the films De las caras del espejo and Memorias de un loco (35-minute fiction based on "Diary of a Madman" by Nikolai Gogol) were exhibited for the public at the General San Martín Cultural Center, Buenos Aires. That year, he presented his films De las caras del espejo, Ecce civitas nostra (15-minute documentary co-directed with Jorge Polaco) and Memorias de un loco at the Union of Filmmakers of Moscow, in the Soviet capital, later traveling to Kutaisi, Soviet Socialist Republic of Georgia, to take part in the Film Festival for Children and Youth held by the Vladimir Lenin All-Union Pioneer Organization.

In 1986, César toured Hungary, Czechoslovakia, and the German Democratic Republic, where he exhibited De las caras del espejo and the short films Del génesis, Ecce civitas nostra, and Memorias de un loco. That year, De las caras del espejo was awarded the bronze medal at the 30th London Film Festival and the Silver Palm at the 26th Huy World Film Festival, in the Belgian city. On the occasion of the official visit of President Raúl Alfonsín to the Soviet Union in October 1986, the films Ecce civitas nostra and Memorias de un loco were shown on television in the country. Also in 1986, César worked as assistant director of Jorge Polaco in the film Diapasón, also doing it a year later for En el nombre del hijo.

In September 1987, César began shooting La sagrada familia, his second feature film but the first shot in 35mm format, with a script by Juan Carlos Vezzulla. The film was shot for the most part in an abandoned silo in the port area of Buenos Aires, with exteriors filmed in other locations on the outskirts of the city. La sagrada familia was released commercially in Argentina on July 1, 1988. In 1988, it received the Jury Prize at the International Film Festival of Figueira da Foz, Portugal. It was also presented at the International Week of Author Film in Málaga, Spain, in May 1989, where it received the Audience Award for Best Film. In Argentina, La sagrada familia competed at the 1988 First Film Festival of Bariloche, where it won awards for Best Male Performance (Ariel Bonomi), Best Camera Work (Oscar López), and Best Scenography (Ramiro Cesio). López and Cesio were once again awarded at the Film Festival of Santa Fe. In 1989, La sagrada familia received the award for Best First Feature at the Lauro Sin Cortes Awards, organized by the Sin Cortes film magazine.

In 1989, César served as artistic advisor to Jorge Polaco for the film Kindergarten. From July 29 to August 5 of that year, the director was part of the official jury of the Kélibia International Film Festival, Tunisia, where he screened La sagrada familia out of competition. At the conclusion of the festival's activities, César was one of the signatories of the Manifesto for the Dissemination of Independent Short Films together with the filmmakers Laurent Huet (France), Denis Laplante (Canada), Michel Lomet (Belgium), Darvish Hayatu (Iran), Michel Ionascu (France), Richard Kaplan (USA), Idriss Diabaté (Ivory Coast), Viola Shafik (Germany), Nick Deocampo (Philippines) and Taoufik Abid (Tunisia), among others. This document was distributed to the official authorities of the countries of the signatories, demanding the presence of independent films in broadcast spaces such as cinema and television. This visit to Tunisia was César's first trip to the African continent and from there the idea of making a film in co-production between both countries was born.

=== 1990–2002: The "trilogy of triumphs" and Fuego gris ===
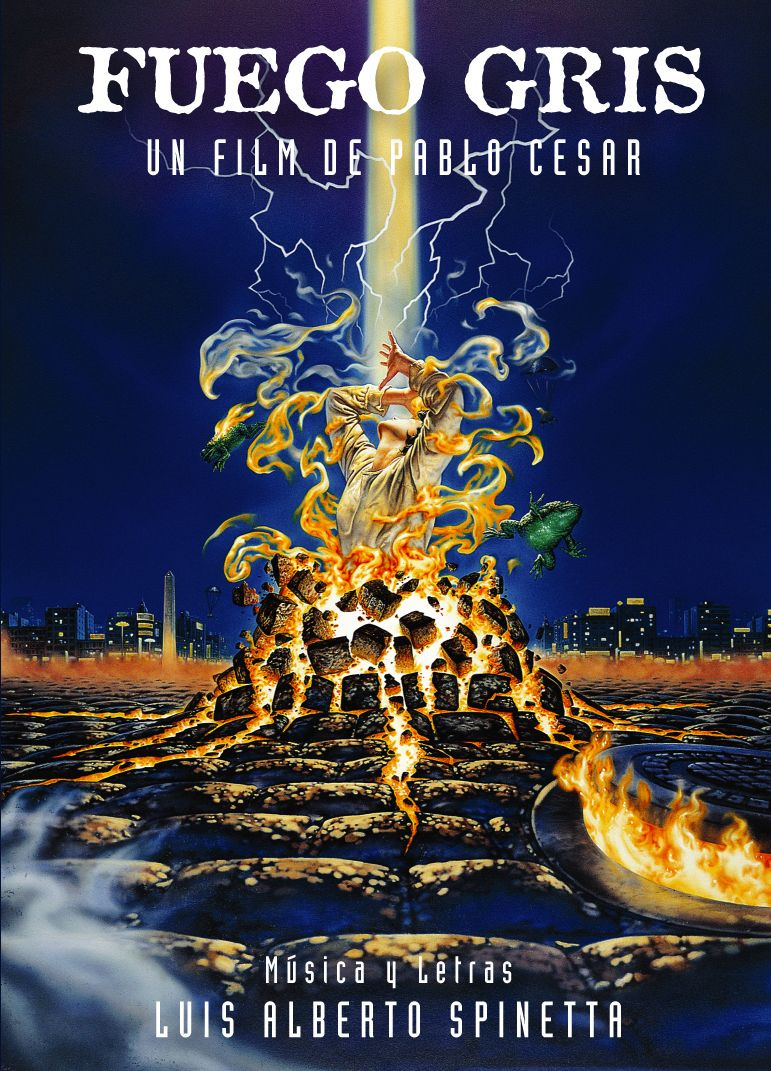
Poster created by artist Ciruelo Cabral for the 1994 film Fuego gris, which featured original music by Luis Alberto Spinetta.

In 1990, César signed a co-production contract with Tunisia to film the film Equinoccio, el jardín de las rosas, becoming the first Latin American director to direct a co-production on the African continent. Filming took place between July and August of that year, in the Tunisian towns of Mahdia, La Chebba, Matmata, El Djem and the island of Djerba. In 2014, César reflected on the experience:

It was my first step in something that I had not imagined would happen: co-productions with African nations. I remember when I entered the souks of Tunis. They had an arch at the entrance. On the way out I passed by the side without realizing it and stopped. I noticed that I had come out somewhere else and then I wondered if I had really been able to get out of that magnetizing universe.

The Argentine premiere of Equinoccio, el jardín de las rosas coincided with the opening of the Tunisian Embassy in Buenos Aires in April 1991. Interviewed by the newspaper La Prensa, the Chargé d'Affaires commissioned for the opening of the embassy, Hassine Souki, declared: "Culture already unites us through an agreement signed in 1968 that has borne multiple fruits, the last of which is the cinema, through the recently known co-production of Equinoccio, el jardín de las rosas, by Pablo César.

Between 1991 and 1993, César was a professor at the Sergei Eisenstein film school of the Argentine Society for Cultural Relations with the USSR (SARCU), where he had studied Russian. SARCU was closed as a result of the dissolution of the USSR in 1990, and César resumed teaching in 1992 after the founding of the Universidad del Cine in Buenos Aires, of which he was one of the first professors and continues to teach until today.

César's third 35mm feature film was Fuego gris, whose screenplay he wrote together with Gustavo Viau. For the soundtrack of the film, César contacted famous musician Luis Alberto Spinetta, proposing that he provide him with the rights to some songs and, if he wished, that he compose some for the film. Spinetta felt that it was not appropriate to use old songs because "they had been made for other purposes" and, instead, offered César to compose the music for the entire film, based on the already written script. In his biography of Spinetta, the journalist Sergio Marchi noted the novelty that this meant for the musician's career: "It is curious that, precisely, Spinetta, an artist to whom no one could ever put conditions, agreed to work with a new body of songs that must fit the constraint of a script. Those seventeen songs would make up one of the most irregular albums by an irregular artist: Fuego gris could work as a sequel to Pelusón of milk, and in some way repeats its structure, although slightly altered."

Fuegro gris was shot in 1993 in Buenos Aires, with some scenes filmed in Cape Verde. In a televised interview during the shooting of the film, César explained:

It is the first time [Spinetta] does this in Argentine cinema. I took the project to him, I didn't know him personally. I showed him Equinoccio, el jardín de las rosas, a co-production that I did with Tunisia in 1990, which was my second feature film. He really liked that project, he keeps saying that for him it is a very daring film (...). And from then on, with the script... Even he participated in the script. I don't want to say that he is a screenwriter, he gave us ideas in the script of the movie. And we started working out where each song was going. Because it is not that there is a song that tells what is happening (...), if that was the case, another musician and another director should do it. The idea of the lyrics is that they are very poetic, very strong, that Spinetta is writing...

For the Fuego gris poster, César and Spinetta contacted the artist Ciruelo Cabral, whose illustration was also used for the cover of the soundtrack, released by Polydor Records in 1994. The film was presented at the 1994 edition of the International Festival of New Latin American Cinema in Havana and the International Film Festival of India (IFFI); and had its Argentine premiere at the Maxi cinema in Buenos Aires on August 26 of that year. It was one of the only five Argentine films that were released in 1994.

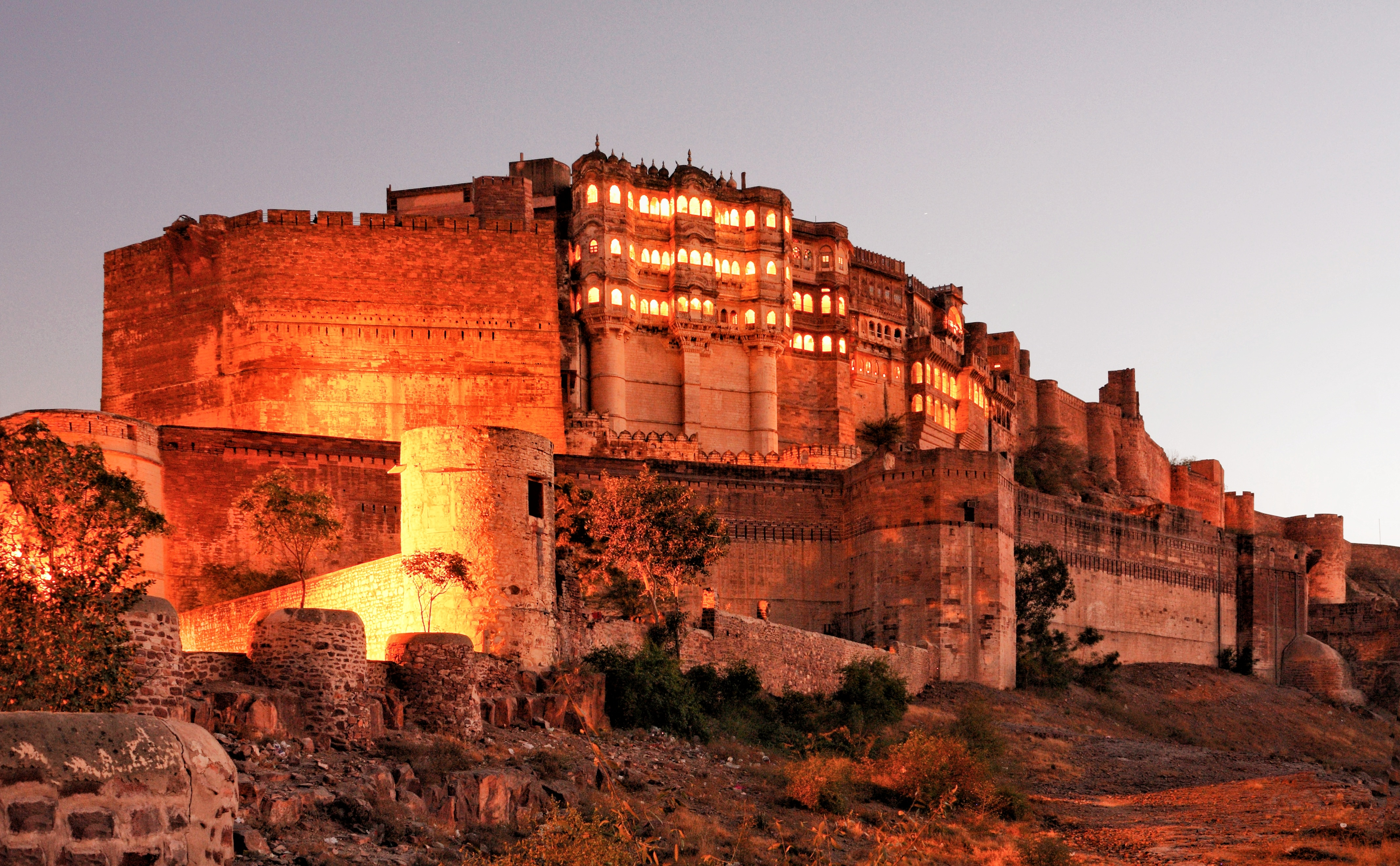
View of Jodhpur, one of the locations of Unicornio, el jardín de las frutas (1996), the first co-production between Argentina and India. Originally planned to be shot in Karnataka state, the film was eventually shot in Rajasthan.

While in Calcutta presenting Fuego gris at IFFI (held 0–20 January 1994), César contacted Indian producers to find the location for his next film, Unicornio, el jardín de las frutas, the second part of the so-called "trilogy of triumphs" that had begun with Equinoccio, el jardín de las rosas. One of the co-production proposals he received was to shoot in the state of Karnataka, although its landscapes did not coincide with César's idea of having a more desert setting and golden colors. On the night of January 14, César was invited to the suite of the Taj Bengal Hotel in Calcutta where the Italian filmmaker Michelangelo Antonioni was staying, to have dinner with him, Pino Solanas and their respective wives. Antonioni recommended that he shoot Unicornio, el jardín de las frutas in the state of Rajasthan, as it suited the characteristics he was looking for. However, after the insistence of an Indian producer, César traveled to Karnataka and signed a co-production contract to film in that state. Due to non-compliance on the part of said Indian producer, César traveled to India again and contacted the director Murali Nair, signing a new co-production contract to shoot the film in Rajasthan. Filmed in and on the outskirts of Jaisalmer and Jodhpur, in the state of Rajasthan, Unicornio, el jardín de las frutas is the first co-production between Argentina and India. In an interview with César and Nair for Clarín on the occasion of the film's premiere, journalist Diego Lerer wrote:

He has arrived here (the newsroom) in the company of Murali Nair, a young Indian man who served as producer for India in this first co-production between the two countries. Nair was not the original producer of Unicornio, on the Indian side, but the businessman who had closed a deal with Pablo César not only caused him many problems at first (as the director will refer to below) but later had the rudeness to die. Nice things happen on film. Especially if it's so many thousands of miles from home. But the director is already an expert in filming against all odds.

The last part of the "trilogy of triumphs" is Afrodita, el jardín de los perfumes, released in 1998. The film was a co-production with Mali and was shot in a Dogon village called Na-Komo near Sangha, where the Bandiagara cliffs are; and in the town of Gao, in the northeast of the country. César traveled to Mali in January 1997 and met with the National Center for Cinematographic Production (CNPC) in the town of Hombori, presenting the project of Afrodita, el jardín de los perfumes to them. He returned to the African country on August 14, 1997, and signed the co-production contract with the CNPC in the city of Bamako, starting filming in May of the following year. Upon returning to Argentina, the material filmed in Gao never reached the director and he was forced to return to the Malian town to shoot the scenes of the film again. In order to cover the costs of reshooting the missing scenes, César decided to mortgage his office in the hope of support from the National Institute of Cinema and Audiovisual Arts (INCAA). On August 8, 1998, the director stated in an interview with Clarín: "When we arrived here (Argentina) we found that one of the packages had been lost, with 30% of the printed material. The airline says it's going to show up, but since it hasn't happened yet, I decided to go back there (to Mali) and shoot again. And since Argentine insurance does not cover these risks, I am more indebted than before."

=== 2003–2011: Sangre, Hunabkú and Orillas ===
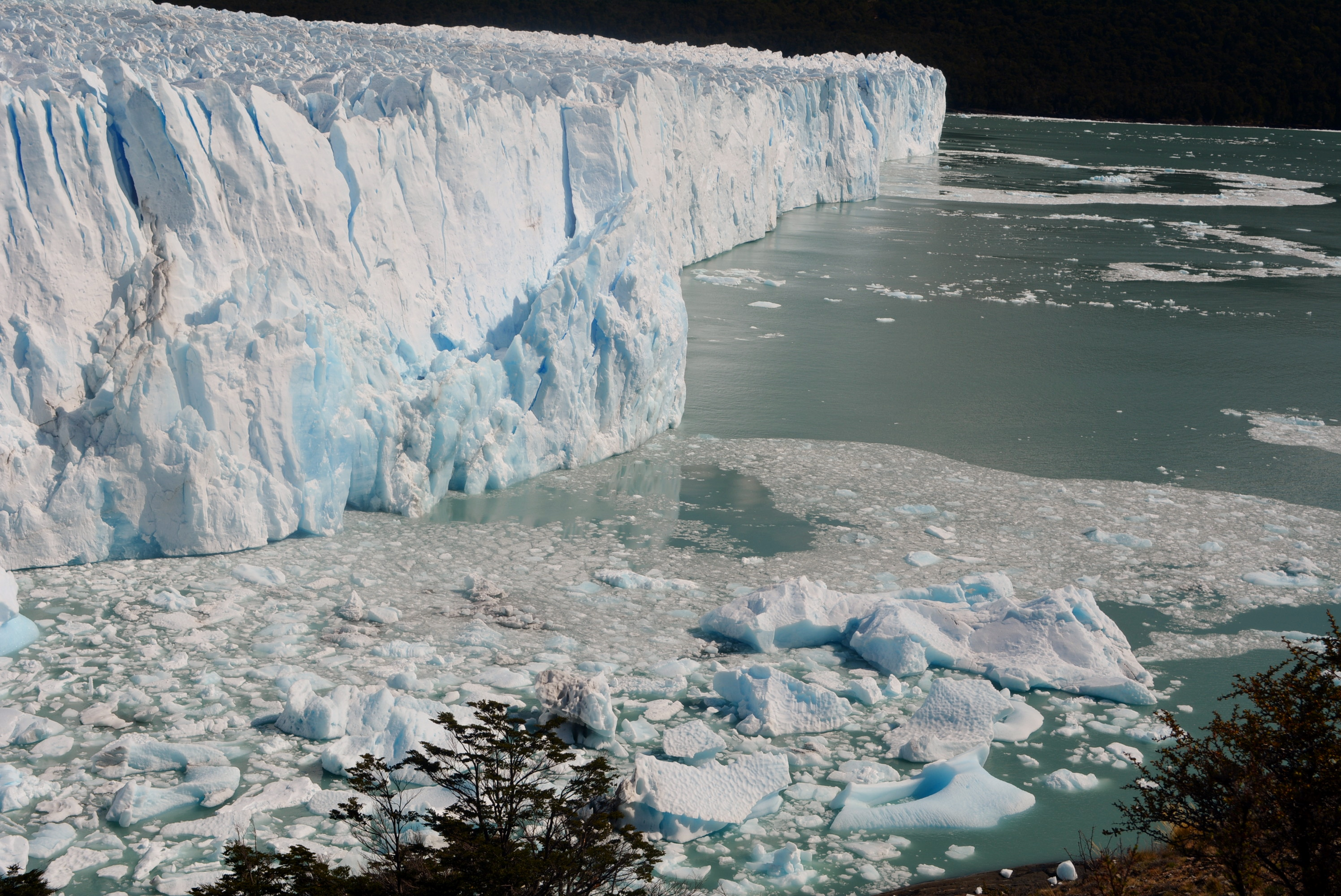
Much of the film Hunabkú (2007) —made with the support of INCAA and the Municipality of El Calafate— was shot on the Perito Moreno glacier, in Argentine Patagonia.

Sangre is César's sixth 35mm feature film, with a script by him and his brother Mike. It was screened for the first time in November 2003 as part of the Official Competition of the Amiens International Film Festival, in the French city, where the protagonist Ivonne Fournery received the Best Actress Award. The film had its Argentine premiere on December 4, 2003.

His next film, Hunabkú, was filmed in El Calafate and the Perito Moreno glacier, Santa Cruz Province, in Argentine Patagonia; carried out with the support of INCAA and the Municipality of El Calafate. The film was shot in September 2006, which complicated the sound direction as it was a windy month. Much of Hunabkú was filmed in dangerous conditions, due to the danger of walking on the glacier. In an interview with Los Andes, the director commented on this: "Luckily there were no accidents. But there is a moment when Lucas (Arévalo), the protagonist, feels attracted by the icy water of the glacier and jumps into it without digital tricks. There were three repetitions of the scene and in two of them the glacier thundered and released a large piece of ice that produced giant waves." César explained how he managed to shoot on the glacier in an article for Kodak's In Camera magazine:

Argentine filmmaker Pablo César loves to shoot in risky conditions. He has directed films in the Sahara desert and in North India. His most recent production, Hunabkú, was produced in Patagonia, with much of the action taking place on a glacier that rises 300 feet above the ocean. César asked cinematographer Abel Peñalba to join him on the adventure. The duo had previously collaborated on the feature film Sangre. "When we did the exploration at the beginning of 2006, the glacier looked like an enormous white blanket capable of transmitting the necessary peace," says César. César decided early on that the film would be produced in 35mm format. "Despite the advances digital technology has made in recent years, I'm still not convinced by the results I've seen," he says. "Also, the cost of renting one of the really good digital cameras is very high, as is the cost of the transfer processes from digital to 35mm." In keeping with this approach, Peñalba used "normal" focal lengths and natural light, avoiding strong fill light where possible. On the glacier, he used only a smooth reflected fill to adjust the close-ups. He used the Academy 1.85 aspect ratio because he felt it was better suited to landscapes, choosing Kodak Vision 2 250D and Kodak Vision 2 500T film.

Hunabkú premiered in Argentina in October 2007. The following month, the film was presented at the IFFI, held in the city of Goa, where César was also a member of the jury. Hunabkú also participated in the Biarritz Film Festival, the Cinemagic Film Festival in Belfast, the Amiens International Film Festival and the Pune International Film Festival in India.

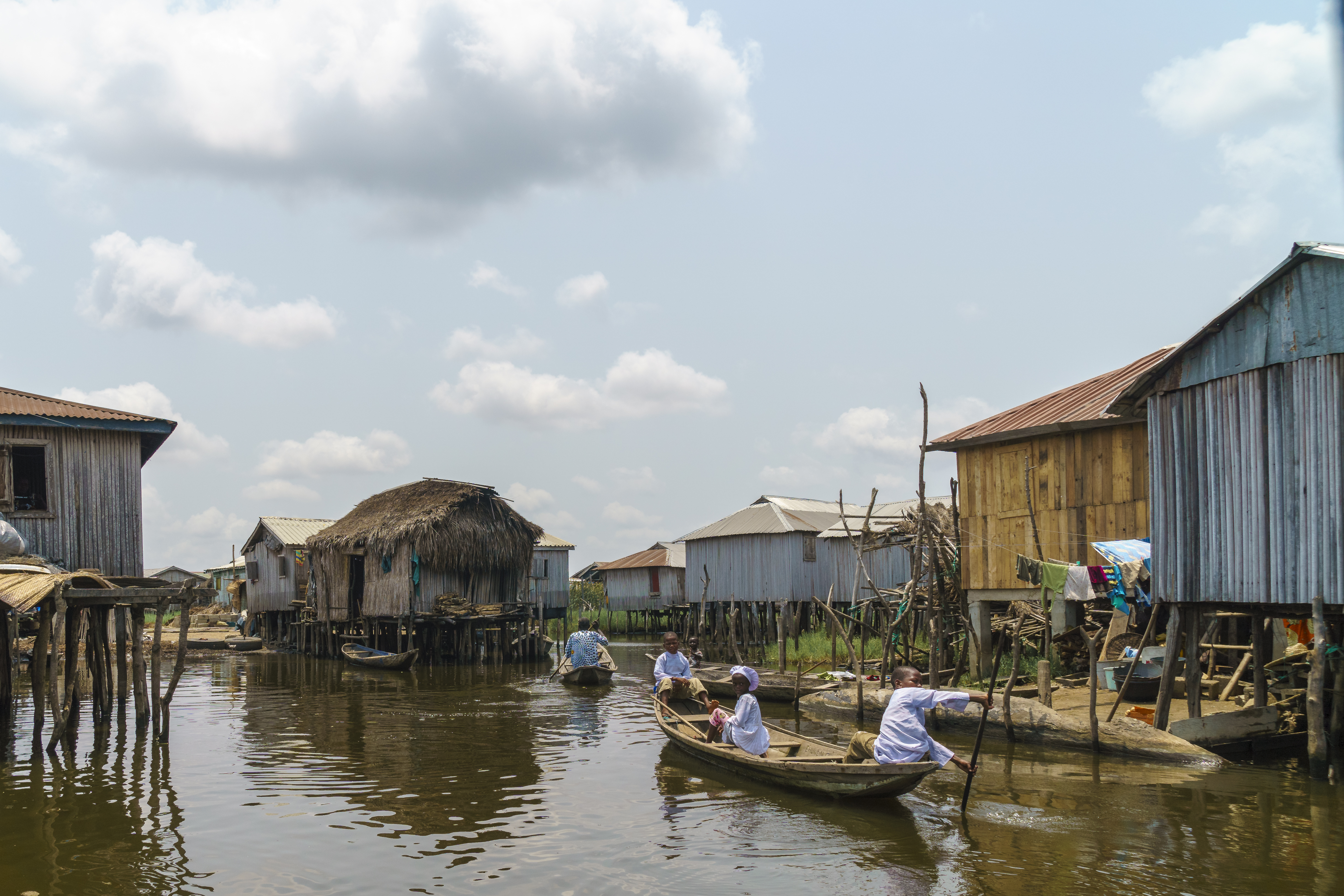
The city of Ganvié—built on the waters of Lake Nokoué—was one of the locations for the film Orillas (2011), the first co-production between Argentina and Benin.

In 2008, César made a trip to Benin together with the screenwriter Jerónimo Toubes, visiting the cities of Ganvié and Ouidah, in order to develop a film about the African roots in the population of Argentina. The following year, César returned to Benin accompanied by executive producer Pablo Ballester, signing a co-production contract with the Directorate of Cinematography of Benin. On February 26, 2010, filming began on the resulting film, Orillas, with two weeks of filming in Sakété and another two in Ouidah, Ganvié and Porto-Novo. Orillas is Argentina's first film co-production with a sub-Saharan African country. On the occasion of the film, the Argentine Ambassador to Nigeria, Susana Pataro, wrote in September 2010: "Last November, when Pablo César visited the filming locations, we had the opportunity to accompany him on part of the tour of emblematic sites such as the town of Ouidah, from where thousands of slaves left for the Americas. Today it is a peaceful fishing port that can be reached from Cotonou, (...) after an hour's journey. Until you reach the small beach, you travel along the 'slave route' in a shocking journey of just over 2 km."

Orillas combines two intertwined stories, one set in Benin and the other in Argentina. The filming of the Argentine portion took place in April 2010 and lasted 4 weeks, of which 2 took place entirely on Isla Maciel (neighborhood in Dock Sud). The Argentine cast of Orillas was a mix of professional actors—such as Javier Lombardo, Daniel Valenzuela, and Dalma Maradona—with young locals from Isla Maciel with no acting experience. During a rehearsal for the film, a neighbor judged the young actors by their appearance and believed he was witnessing a robbery, causing forty police officers to be sent to the location. The soundtrack of Orillas includes some songs that were composed especially for the film by Los Ñeris del Docke, a hip hop band from Isla Maciel.

In 2010, César was the promoter of a cooperation agreement between INCAA and the Directorate of Cinematography of Benin, to carry out film co-production agreements between both nations. Orillas premiered in Buenos Aires on 10 November 2011, a year after its completion. The film was presented at the New York International Latino Film Festival in the US; the Bogotá International Film Festival in Colombia; the Cinemaissí in Finland; the Vues d'Afrique International Film Festival in Canada; the Rwanda Film Festival in Rwanda; the Festival de Cinéma Image et Vie in Senegal; the International Human Rights Film Festival in Bolivia; and the IFFI in Goa. In 2012, Orillas won the Special Jury Prize and the Audience Award at the Quintessence Festival in the city of Ouidah.

=== 2012–2020: Second trilogy, Pensando en él and El llamado del desierto ===
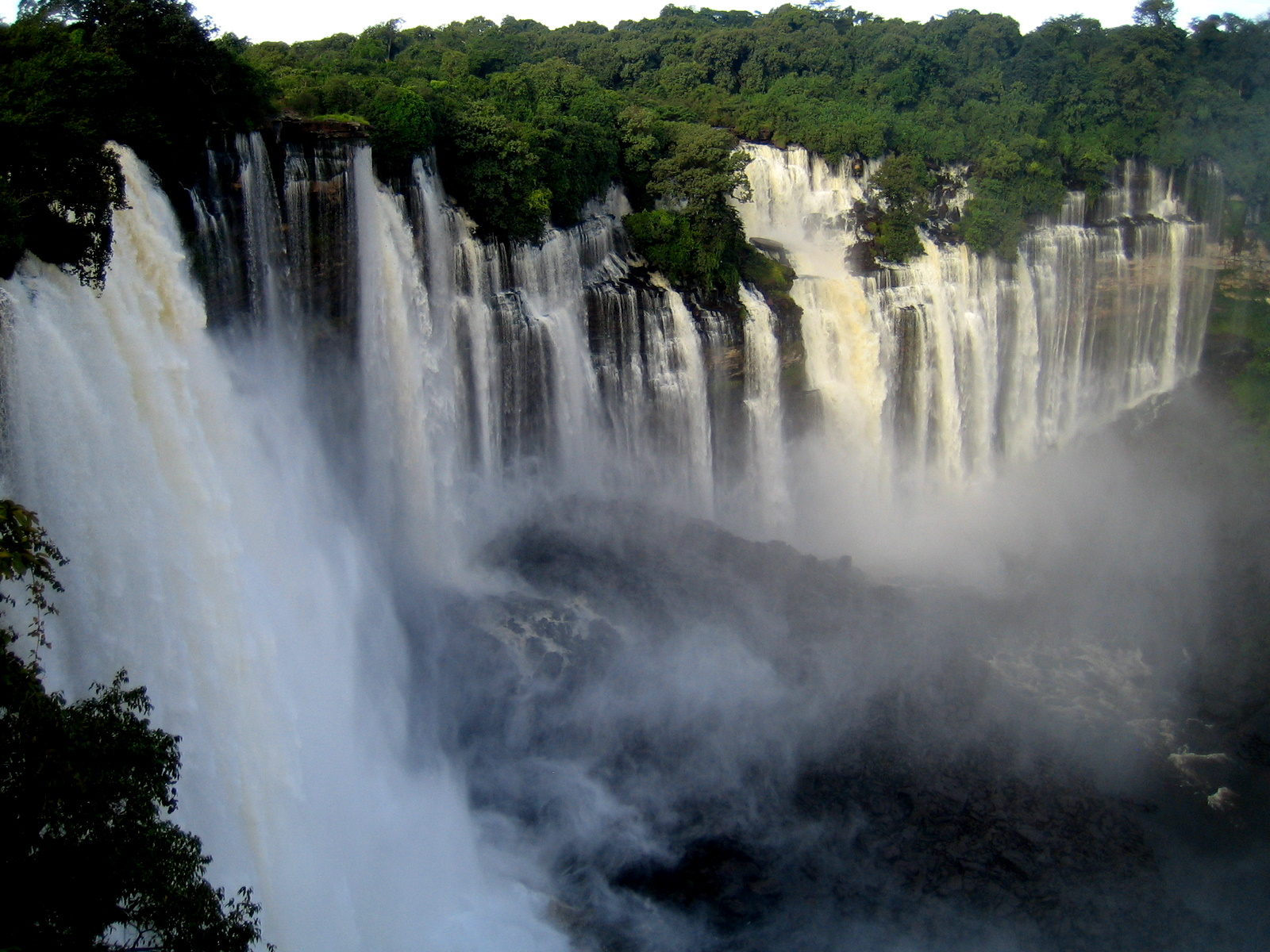
The Kalandula Falls were one of the locations for Los dioses de agua (2014), the first co-production between Argentina, Angola and Ethiopia.

In 2012—invited by the president of INCAA Liliana Mazure for being the only Argentine to direct co-productions with Africa—César joined the trade mission that accompanied President Cristina Fernández de Kirchner to the Argentine Industries Fair in Luanda, Angola. There, he began to establish contacts with the Instituto Angolano do Cinema e do Audiovisual (IACA) seeking to co-produce his next film Los dioses de agua. César made three trips to Angola before signing the co-production contract with IACA, and once to Ethiopia before doing the same with the company Blue Nile Toon.

Starring Juan Palomino and Charo Bogarín (singer of folk duo Tonolec), Los dioses de agua was shot in different geographies of Lunda Norte and Malanje, in Angola, especially in the area of the Kalandula Falls and the Black Rocks at Pungo Andongo; and in Addis Ababa and Lalibela, in Ethiopia, in ancient Coptic monasteries and in an area of ancient obelisks. It thus became the first co-production between Argentina, Angola and Ethiopia. Filming took four weeks in Angola, ten days in Ethiopia, one week in Formosa Province and three in Buenos Aires. In 2017, César recalled: "I went to film in difficult places, I did not go to film in the capitals, we filmed in the Kalandula Falls in Angola and we went to look for a shaman who was 30 kilometers from the border with the Congo. We were driving along a red dirt road with green foliage on the side and someone wanted to urinate and the driver told him that he had to do it next to the car because the field could be mined and there could also be lions." During filming in Angola, a platoon of strangers tried to forcefully board the plane that César had rented for the team, which turned into a physical altercation.

Los dioses de agua premiered at IFFI in Goa on 21 November 2014. In 2015, the film won the Best Foreign Film and Best Director awards at the NiFF Houston Int'l Film Festival in Houston. César summoned the filmmaker Paulo Pécora to record the filming of Los dioses de agua, originally intended to be a "making-off" to be included as an extra on a DVD release. However, the amount of material that Pécora shot was such that he decided to collect it in the documentary film Amasekenalo, a "film within a film" that premiered at the General San Martín Cultural Center in 2017.

After having made Los dioses de agua, César felt that he had not finished with everything he needed to convey, so the idea of making the sequel El cielo escondido came up. The film continues the story of the protagonist, Hermes, although played by actor Pablo Padilla instead of Juan Palomino. The director wrote the script together with the editor Liliana Nadal, whom he had known since his first film. César began looking for potential production partners online after getting the script, eventually meeting Pedro Mendoza of Namibian production company New Mission Films. Filming took place just ten days after the initial correspondence between the director and Mendoza. The film was largely financed by INCAA and the Namibia Film Commission, being the first co-production between Argentina and that country. El cielo escondido was shot in July 2015 in the Namibian towns of Twyfelfontein, Swakopmund, Walvis Bay, Kolmanskop, Lüderitz and the NamibRand Nature Reserve; and in September in the Province of Córdoba, especially the Eden Hotel in La Falda, linked to Nazism. In a 2016 interview, journalist Pablo E. Arahuete asked César what was the hardest part of filming El Cielo Escondido, to which the director replied:

The hardest part was filming the dialogue between Hermes and the two Himba twins, the Hidipo, since they were natural and were not actors. It was the first 3 days of filming and everything was very complex. We also had no choice. It was also difficult for the actor because he had to face the issue of language, despite the fact that Pablo (Padilla) was very professional and every day he studied the phonetics of the Khoekhoe language spoken by the Damara, with the help of a local teacher. But this shooting was wonderful overall. I have only good memories. Namibia is a beautiful place.

El cielo escondido premiered in Namibia on November 4, 2016, at the Ster-Kinekor cinema in Maerua Mall, Windhoek. In 2017, the film won the award for Best Actor (for Padilla) at the AltFF Alternative Film Festival in Toronto, and for Best Film at the Philadelphia Independent Film Awards (IFAP).

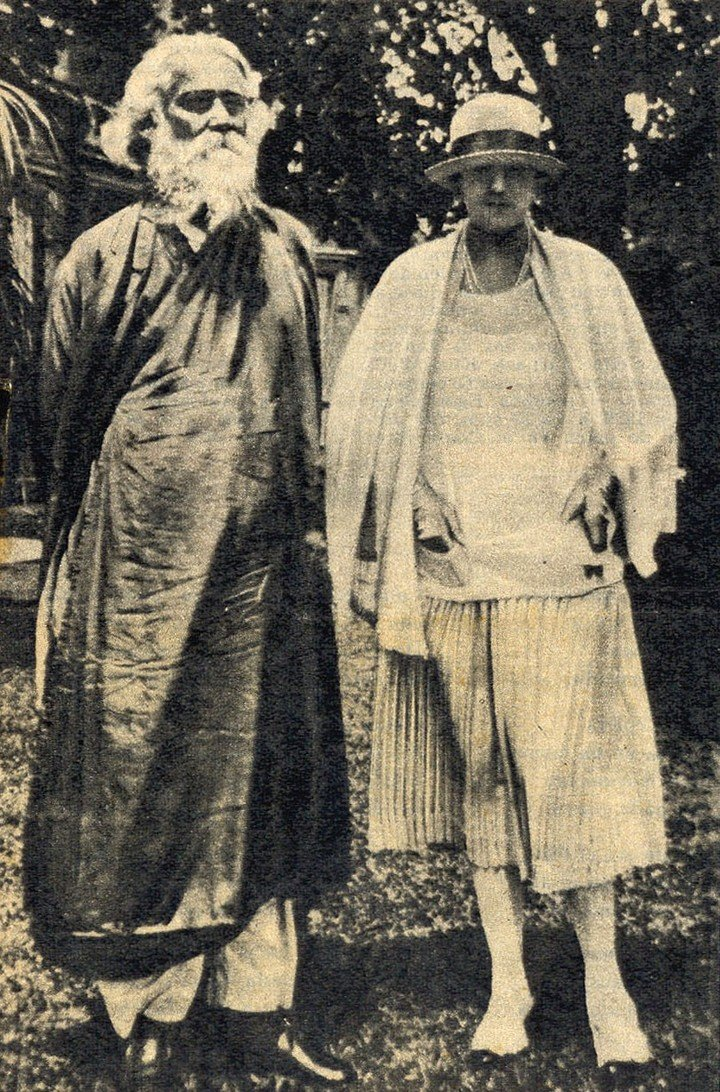
The film Pensando en él (2018)—the second co-production between Argentina and India—recounts the meeting between Rabindranath Tagore and Victoria Ocampo in 1924.

In 2017, César shot Pensando en él (Thinking of Him), a film based on the meeting between Rabindranath Tagore and Victoria Ocampo in 1924 in Buenos Aires, played by Victor Banerjee and Eleonora Wexler, respectively. The idea for the film arose in 2008, when the then Ambassador of India in Argentina, Rengaraj Viswanathan, suggested to César that he tell the story during a visit to the embassy. The filmmaker was very enthusiastic about the idea since he had extensive knowledge of Tagore's literature, especially the translations he had made of Sufi poets. César the explained the research and writing process of the script in an interview with The Indian Express:

I met with Jeronimo Toubes, Argentine scriptwriter. We began to study together. Jeronimo even made a trip to India in 2009 to investigate the subject. For four years, he carried out deep research on the subject. We loved the book of Ketaki Kushari Dyson In Your Blossoming Flower-Garden—a deep work on the relationship between Tagore and Ocampo. We read all the books concerning the educational work of Tagore in Bolpur, Santiniketan, since the focus of the film, although it is the relationship between Tagore and Ocampo, is the fascination of Victoria in the vision of a man on the education of the human soul. The book by Ocampo, Tagore en las barrancas de San Isidro, as well as the letters exchanged between them helped us to discover the mutual fascination that existed between the two.

Pensando en él is the second co-production between Argentina and India. It was shot in Argentina—including the Villa Ocampo residence—and in India, including a Tagore house and "El Ashram", a kind of school founded by him. Pensando en él was presented as the closing film at the IFFI in Goa. It had its Argentine premiere on August 24, 2018, and its Indian premiere in September 2019. In 2018, the film was selected to participate in the Asian Film Festival in Taiwan, the Dhaka International Film Festival and the Latin American Film Festival. According to Satish Singh of the Indian newspaper Afternoon Voice: "Honourable President of India Ram Nath Kovind has also mentioned about the film Thinking of Him in his address. This happened when Argentina's President Mauricio Macri met the Honourable President of India on February 18, 2019. Argentina's President Macri had come to India for attending the 70th year of the establishment of formal diplomatic relations between India and Argentina."

In 2016, César met the Moroccan producer Souad Lamriki—co-founder of the production company Agora Films—during a panel on African co-productions, held within the framework of the Mar del Plata International Film Festival. They decided to collaborate on a film, resulting in El llamado del desierto, directed by César and released in Argentina on June 29, 2018. Although Argentina and Morocco had signed a film collaboration memorandum of understanding in 2000, El llamado del desierto was the first co-production between the two countries. Most of its financing was provided by INCAA and the Center Cinématographique Marocain (CCM). According to the director, the film was "forged by a desire to initiate co-production activity between the two nations, rather than to develop a pre-selected project or existing screenplay." The script was written by Jerónimo Toubes and later translated into French, in part so that it could be considered by the MCC, but also to be reviewed by Agora Films before retaining the scenes in Spanish and reworking relevant sections of dialogue in Moroccan Arabic. In 2021, El llamado del desierto had its world premiere in the Official Competition of the tenth edition of the Festival International De Cinéma Et De Mémoire Commune in Nador, Morocco, where actor Abdellah Cakiri won the award for Best Leading Actor.

César has given several conferences on the so-called "South-South Cooperation" (Spanish: Cooperación Sur-Sur), promoting modes of production, distribution and dissemination of films from the global south that contrast with the mainstream trends. He has given seminars on the subject with his partner Pablo Ballester at the IFFI (2015), the Kelibia International Film Festival (2016), the Carthage Film Festival] (2017), FESPACO (2015) and the Kalasha Film Market. (2018).

In 2020 he released El día del pez, the first co-production between Argentina and Ivory Coast, and the last part of the trilogy formed together with Los dioses de agua and El cielo escondido.

=== 2021–present: Macongo, la Córdoba africana and upcoming projects ===
In 2023, Cèsar released his first feature-length documentary film, Macongo, la Córdoba africana, in which he interviews historians, ethnologists, anthropologists and residents about the legacy of Afro-descendants in the province of Córdoba. Due to the context of crisis in national film production, aggravated by the COVID-19 pandemic, César decided to undertake the project independently. César has said he plans to repeat the project in other provinces, including Santiago del Estero, Tucumán, Corrientes and Misiones.

Also in 2023, César shot two feature films that are yet to be released. In February, shooting began on Historia de dos guerreros in the province of Corrientes, more precisely in the town of Empedrado and in the Cambá Cuá neighborhood of the provincial capital. On February 6, the director presented the project in the Salón Verde of the provincial Government House, at a press conference accompanied by the head of the Institute of Culture, Gabriel Romero, and the mayor of Empedrado, José Cheme, together with the actors Alejo Isnardi and Idriss Mousa Sare and the executive producer Pablo Ballester. The film is supported by INCAA and the Institute of Culture of the Government of the Province of Corrientes.

In June 2023, shooting began on Después del final, a biopic about Luz Fernández de Castillo, an Argentine painter, writer and gallery owner. With a screenplay by Jerónimo Toubes, the film stars Luz Castillo herself, with a cast that also includes Eleonora Wexler, Héctor Bidonde, Nilda Raggi, Natalia Cociuffo and Alejandro Botto, among others. Speaking to La Nación on the occasion of the start of shooting, Castillo declared: "I think the film can leave a legacy and show new generations other worlds and values they don't know about (...) I accepted César's proposal because no one is bitter about a sweet and because at 88 years old, someone proposing you to make a film about your life is something as incredibly wonderful as it is unusual. There was no reason to say no."

Currently, César is preparing two new films, one about the cult of Santo Rey Baltazar in Goya, Corrientes, and another one entitled Santo Tomé, la Santa Fe Africana. He also announced that he plans to shoot a fiction feature film about María Remedios del Valle, an Afro-descendant soldier of the Argentine War of Independence.

== Style and influences ==
P. E. Arahuete: "If you had to draw a bridge between the poetics in your films and the African continent, where are they?"
P. César: "They are twinned. The emotion that the sound of the dozens of percussion instruments from Africa, or string instruments, as well as wind instruments, produces in me is something that I try to convey in my films with a poetic palette. Rediscovering an ancestral language in the drawings or paintings of houses of ethnic groups that enclose mysterious languages that possibly have belonged to other civilizations, is something that generates a deep emotion in me. Well, if there is something wonderful about life, for me, it is that we do not know anything and how nice it is to know that there is still so much to discover."

— César interviewed by Pablo Ernesto Arahuete in 2015.

César's work is considered an exponent of independent and auteur cinema, characterized by its use of allegorical, poetic, contemplative, symbolic and dreamlike images. In a 1995 interview, the filmmaker declared his admiration for directors Pier Paolo Pasolini, Werner Herzog and Federico Fellini, while in a 2017 interview he mentioned his admiration for Satyajit Ray, whom he considers the best filmmaker in India. Several authors have pointed out—sometimes critically— that César's films do not resort to the visual and narrative models of commercial cinema, opting for a poetic and personal cinematographic language. In this regard, César pointed out in a 1994 interview that his work "is for those who get carried away by my stories, it is not a merely industrial cinema."

César's work is made entirely in film format. His production in Super-8 includes experimental films, documentaries, and fiction and animated films. His first feature film in 35 mm, La sagrada familia (1988), is an ironic and socially critical film that has been compared to the cinema of Luis Buñuel. It is considered an allegory of the time of the last civic-military dictatorship in Argentina, described by the director as a film "about the abuse of power where religious, economic, political and military powers come together." According to critic Juan Carlos Fontana, the film "shows to what degree of madness various social strata can reach when they become sick with fanaticism".

César is a student of mythology, ethnology and ethnography, which are central elements of much of his work. In 2015, journalist Pablo Ernesto Arahuete asked the director if he saw cinema as a tool for transmitting myths, to which he replied:

myths are found in the most commercial adventure films in the history of cinema. The wonderful book by Joseph Campbell, The Hero with a Thousand Faces, has been taken as a lead by George Lucas to write Star Wars. This he claims himself and with great happiness. Campbell goes through ancient myths associating them and marking the route that the heroes take in each story. In a word, it is the way of man in life. In the case of the films I make, I try to bring the viewer closer to a myth through a story with an air of adventure, mystery and slight suspense.

The first part of the "trilogy of triumphs", Equinoccio, el jardín de las rosas (1991) tells the story of an angel that flies over five towns, with a different event arising in each one. The film is based on Sufi poetry and philosophy, especially the works of Saadi Shirazi, Hafez and Omar Khayyam. Film critic César Magrini defined the film as "visually a sustained poem, (...) full of strange and very captivating suggestion, derived both from the subject matter and from its treatment, which is (...) pronouncedly magical and poetic..."

César has acknowledged that his "discovery" of African and Asian films in Paris in 1986 was a turning point in his career, leading to his decision to film in India and the African continent beginning in the 1990s. In 2023, Página/12 described him as the "only filmmaker in Latin America who has dedicated more than 20 years to dealing with African themes." According to scholar Lieve Spaas of the University of Alabama, the geographic diversity of his films "reveals the filmmaker's determination to reflect on the ways in which cinema innovates traditional practices of representation by defamiliarizing existing perceptions of culture." One example is Afrodita, el jardín de los perfumes (1998), in which César recreates the Greek myth of Aphrodite but alters its traditional paradigm of feminine beauty, since it places the story in the heart of Africa and represents the goddess as a black and male character.

In turn, César's choice of plots and locations has been analyzed in terms of a colonial, postcolonial and neocolonial discourse. In Afrodita, el jardín de los perfumes, for example, he evokes the colonial invasion with the appearance of Aphrodite on the coast of Africa. In this sense, Spaas related the film to the Third Cinema movement of the 1960s, which sought a "destruction of the images of colonial or neocolonial cinema, and the construction of another cinema that captures the revolutionary impulse of the peoples of the Third World". In a 2020 interview, César said about the theme of his work: "In my films I always try to have a theme that unites the countries and a contribution from both parties, from the producers—both technically, artistically and economic—because that's what a true co-production is like."

According to the American researcher and professor David William Foster, Afrodita, el jardín de los perfumes can be interpreted under the notion of queerness, arguing that the film challenges heteronormativity and gender binarism in its heterodox representation of the goddess of love. Foster noted that the character of Aphrodite, represented by a male body, is perceived as male or female depending on the narrative situation. The theme of sexual ambiguity is also present in the other two films of the trilogy: Equinoccio, el jardín de las rosas and Unicornio, el jardín de las frutas (1998). The story of the latter is organized around five episodes, connected through some texts by Omar Khayyam that were strategically placed within each of them. Lisa Nesselson of Variety called Unicorn the Fruit Garden: "A celluloid oddity bathed in homoerotic overtones (...) Via a circular structure linked by a sloshed poet, pic incorporates human sacrifice, much symbolic tweaking of male nipples and other ritualistic behavior set in mystical vistas inhabited by hairless young Indian youths in scanty attire." For his part, César described the style of the film:

Unicornio is nothing more than a simple film that tries to reach the sleeping heart of contemporary man and fills it with flowers in an attempt to help him recover that lost contemplation of the majority. Simple things that day to day seem to be beyond the reach of the new generations.

Defined as the "first rock drama of Argentine cinema", Fuego gris (1994) is a film with no dialogues. Critic Claudio D. Minghetti described César's work as the "cinema of the impossible" and considered that Fuego gris broke with the ideological and aesthetic conventions of industrial cinema. According to the director, the film has an adventure structure through the subjective world and the objective world, in the manner of an "Alice in Horrorland." Writing for La Nación, Claudio España summarized the style of the movie:

The film connotes an individual, personal, complex and sui generis interior space. It also expresses the tastes of our time and in this regard the pleasure for the staging and the framing derived from the comic books is clear. There is no narrative unity but it retains a style throughout its duration. It does not stick to the content of the music and the lyrics of Spinetta, it rises above them in intensity and even in bold aggressiveness. They are languages of this time of which Pablo César—without using a single line of dialogue throughout the work—is a witness and eloquent transmitter.

Sangre (2003) marked a stylistic shift in César's work, being described as his most personal film at the time of its release. It is a film with autobiographical content in which César evokes his own mother. In his review of the film, Adolfo C. Martínez from La Nación wrote: "After his previous filmography, focused on a theme that went through veiled sensations and a certain experimental attitude, the director now decided to turn his work around inserting himself into a realistic story..."

César described Hunabkú (2007) as his most accessible film. Its editing "goes back and forth" as the film explores concepts such as "the real world and what lies beyond, primal energy, and the idea of time as a human creation and not a natural one." The film's visual content, dominated by its large views of the Perito Moreno glacier, led one critic to consider it more of an illustration than a cinematic narrative. Ámbito Financiero's review noted the stylistic differences between Hunabkú and the "trilogy of triumphs":

Certainly, [the film] contacts in some way with the trilogy of the gardens, although in a closer and less literary way. Also less provocative, and perhaps deliberately more naive. Not anymore, the strange landscapes of Tunisia, Mali, and Hindustan. Not anymore, the old palaces and the dozens of locals acting as extras in ceremonies capable of dialoguing with Pasolini. Nor the succession of stories and poems, the anti-religious admonitions, the increasingly open and artistic sexual suggestions, within the concepts handled by César, a true independent before the industrialization of the term independent."

César's cinema has largely focused on vindicating the cultural legacy of the Afro-descendant population in Argentina, a taboo subject in the country. The director expressed in 2019 that "almost all my films refer to Afro roots in Argentina." His film Orillas (2011) raises this issue, reflecting on the cultural links between Argentina and Benin. In a 2015 interview, César felt that:

Only now, in recent years, have great steps been taken towards reconciliation. (...) The invisibility of Afro-descendants in the history of our country has taken place. However, our cities and culture were built on the knowledge of men and women who came from different parts of Africa. (...) All porteños evoke Africans when speaking in our day to day and we don't know it because we are very dispersed, distracted by so much technology and consumerist anxiety. Many of our heroes were Afro-descendants and hid it precisely because of that desire to make invisible, to hide the truth and to build the illusion of a white Argentina.

The theme of the legacy of the Afro-Argentine community is central in the trilogy formed by Los dioses de agua (2014), El cielo escondido (2016) and El día del pez (2020), films that follow the character of Hermes, an anthropologist. The content of Los dioses de agua reflects César's readings Marcel Griaule, and his interest in the cosmogonies of the Dogon and Tchokwe peoples. In an interview with Página/12, he explained his interest in the philosophy of these cultures: "When writer Erich von Däniken published the book Memories of the Future, which pointed out that we had been visited by beings from more advanced civilizations, they treated him like crazy. Now, it is very common to ask if humanity had a very high development and if, at some point, that humanity disappeared. So, what interests me is how these languages can be encrypted in drawings, elements or sculptures. And, sometimes, we have them in front of us. It's not that they're so hidden."

The director maintained that the genres of suspense, thriller, action and adventure "crept in" the film Los dioses de agua. Journalist Pablo E. Arahuete pointed out that, unlike Los dioses de agua, El cielo escondido "this time does not appeal so much to the realm of dreams, but develops a suspense story, anchored in the idea of silencing those voices that try to tell what the true interests are behind the facades of foundations or powerful groups, who see in the African continent and its population the most brutal and reactionary pretext as part of an authoritarian discourse that simply relies on the rules of the most savage capitalism."

Pensando en él (2018) reconstructs the 1924 meeting between Tagore and Ocampo (filmed in black and white), and intertwines it with the story of a character who reads about it in the present time. Director of photography Carlos Wajsman opined on the style of the film:

It is a strange film, because it is not a biopic, although Tagore did meet Victoria Ocampo. There are two fictions: one that takes place in the current era and another that takes place at the beginning of the last century. What he tells is taken from Victoria Ocampo's books, there are even situations that are taken from her first-person impressions, but they are staged as a work of fiction. On the other hand, it's strange, because other films by Pablo César are more fantastic: a character, who goes in search of fantastic things that happen in exotic countries, goes through a series of adventures... Instead, this one recreates real events—the period part—staged. Real events told from the director's point of view.

In Macongo, la Córdoba africana (2023)—his first feature-length documentary—César returns to the theme of the legacy of the Afro-Argentine community, which he had previously explored in the trilogy of Los dioses de agua, El cielo escondido and El día del pez. In the film, the director travels through the province of Córdoba interviewing historians, ethnologists, anthropologists and local residents about the legacy of the Afro-descendant population in the province. Part of the documentary was shot in Super-8 and the rest in 16 mm film.

== Filmography ==
=== Short films ===
- La diversión del rey (1975)
- Lúgubre venganza (1977)
- El espiritista (1977)
- El caso Mandrox (1977)
- El medallón (1977)
- Objeto de percepción (1978)
- La máquina (1978)
- La viuda negra (1979)
- Itzengerstein (1979)
- La visión de Ezequiel (1979)
- Apocalipsis (1980)
- Del génesis (1980)
- Black Sabbath (1980)
- Segundas Jornadas de Cine No Profesional (directed with Mario Levit) (1980)
- Aeropuertito (1981)
- Teatro de sangre (1982)
- La rebelión de las masas (1982)
- Ecce vivitas nostra (directed with Jorge Polaco) (1983)
- Memorias de un loco (1984)
- O como prólogo (1985)
- Mis vecinos (1985)

=== Feature films ===
- De las caras del espejo (1982)
- La sagrada familia (1988)
- Equinoccio, el jardín de las rosas (1991)
- Fuego gris (1994)
- Unicornio, el jardín de las frutas (1996)
- Afrodita, el jardín de los perfumes (1998)
- Sangre (2003)
- Hunabkú (2007)
- Orillas (2011)
- Los dioses de agua (2014)
- El cielo escondido (2016)
- Pensando en él (2018)
- El llamado del desierto (2018)
- El día del pez (2020)
- Macongo, la Córdoba africana (2023)

== See also ==
- Media related to Pablo César at Wikimedia Commons
- List of Argentines
- List of film and television directors
- Cinema of Africa
- Cinema of Argentina
- Cinema of India
- Cinema of Latin America
