= List of Argentine films of 1988 =

A list of films produced in Argentina in 1988:

Argentine films of 1988
| Title | Director | Release | Genre |
A - C
| Abierto de 18 a 24 | Víctor Dínenzon | 2 June | |
| A dos aguas | Carlos Olguín | 28 April | |
| Alguien te está mirando | Gustavo Cova and Horacio Maldonado | 3 November | |
| Los amores de Kafka | Veda Docampo Feijóo | 4 August | |
| El amor es una mujer gorda | Alejandro Agresti | 2 June | |
| Atracción peculiar | Enrique Carreras | 3 March | |
| Bajo otro sol | Francisco D'Intino | 11 August | |
| Billetes, billetes... | Martín Schor | 6 October | |
| El camino del sur | Juan Bautista Stagnaro | 16 June | |
| La clínica loca | Emilio Vieyra | 5 May | |
| Color escondido | Raúl de la Torre | 26 May | |
D - O
| La deuda interna | Miguel Pereira | 4 August | |
| Expedición Atlantis | Alfredo Barragán | 19 May | |
| Extrañas salvajes | Carlos Lemos | 19 May | |
| The Girlfriend | Jeanine Meerapfel | 21 September | |
| Gracias por los servicios | Roberto Maiocco | 30 June | |
| Hombres de barro | Miguel Mirra | 17 November | |
| Las locuras del extraterrestre | Carlos Galettini | 7 July | |
| Lo que vendrá | Gustavo R. Mosquera | 30 March | |
| Mamá querida | Silvio Fischbein | 29 September | |
P - Z
| Paraíso Relax (Casa de masajes) | Emilio G. Boretta | 7 April | |
| Los pilotos más locos del mundo | Carlos Galettini | 4 February | |
| El profesor punk | Enrique Carreras | 7 July | |
| Las puertitas del Sr. López | Alberto Fischerman | 9 June | |
| La sagrada familia | Pablo César | 30 June | |
| Sinfín | Cristian Pauls | 10 March | |
| Sur | Fernando Solanas | 5 March | |
| Tango, Bayle nuestro | Jorge Zanada | 14 July | |
| Tres alegres fugitivos | Enrique Dawi | 14 July | |

== External links and references ==
- Argentine films of 1988 at the Internet Movie Database
