= Sur =

Sur, SUR or El Sur may refer to:

== Arts, entertainment and media ==
=== Films ===
- Sur (film), a 1988 Argentine film directed by Fernando Solanas
- Sur, a 1970 Mexican film directed by Gabriel Retes
- El Sur (film), a 1983 film by Víctor Erice, based on the novella by Adelaida García Morales
- Los Cuentos de Borges: El Sur (film), a 1992 film by Carlos Saura
- Sur – The Melody of Life, a 2002 Indian film directed by Tanuja Chandra

=== Literature ===
- "Sur" (short story), by Ursula K. Le Guin
- "El Sur" (story) ("The South"), a short story by Jorge Luis Borges
- El Sur, a novella by Adelaida García Morales, basis of the film El Sur

=== Music ===
- "Sur" (song), a tango song composed by Homero Manzi and Aníbal Troilo
- Sur, a 1987 album by Uruguayan singer Jaime Roos
- Sur, a chapter in Sindhi music and poetry
- Svara (स्वर) or sur, the seven notes of the Indian musical scale

=== Periodicals ===
- Sur (magazine), a former literary journal published in Buenos Aires
- El Sur (newspaper), a Chilean newspaper

=== Television channels ===
- ATV Sur, a TV channel in Arequipa, Peru
- Canal Sur, a TV channel in Andalusia, Spain
- Sur Televisora Itapúa, a TV channel in Encarnación, Paraguay
- Telesur, a Latin American TV channel
- Canal SUR (United States), a TV channel in the United States

== Places ==
- Sur Empire, an empire in Northern India between 1538/1540 and 1556
- Sur State, a princely state of India merged with Idar State in 1821
- Sur (river), a river in Bavaria, Germany
- Súr, a village in Hungary
- Sur, Iran (disambiguation)
- Sur, Oman, a town in Oman
- Sur, Switzerland, a village
- Sur, Diyarbakır, a district and municipality of Diyarbakır Province, Turkey
- Tyre, Lebanon (Arabic: Ṣūr; Phoenician: Ṣur; Turkish: Sur), a city in Lebanon
- Shur (Bible) or Sur, a wilderness referred to in the Hebrew Bible

== People ==
- Sur (poet) (c. 1483–c.1563), a blind Hindu saint, poet and musician
- Súr (chieftain) (died 955), Hungarian general
- Sur (tribe), a Pashtun tribe in Afghanistan, Pakistan and India

== Science and technology ==
- Seemingly unrelated regressions (SUR), a statistical technique for analysing multivariate data
- Sulfonylurea receptor (SUR), the molecular target of sulfonylurea antidiabetic drugs
- Shell Update Release, codename of the Microsoft Windows NT 4.0 operating system

== Codes ==
- Soviet ruble (ISO 4217 code: SUR), the currency of the Soviet Union
- Summer Beaver Airport (IATA airport code: SUR), southwest of the First Nations community of Nibinamik, Ontario, Canada
- Surbiton railway station (National Rail station code SUR), London, England
- SS Sur, a Panamanian coaster in service 1955–65
- Solapur railway station in Maharashtra, India

== Other uses ==
- Sur (Komi beverage), an alcoholic beverage
- Sur language, a minor Plateau language of Nigeria
- Sur offering, a burnt offering in Tibetan Buddhism
- Sur SC, a sports club based in Sur, Oman
- Sydney University Regiment, a regiment of the Australian Army
- Glossary of pre-Christian Lithuanian names#sur, a common stem in Lithuanian names

== See also ==
- Big Sur (disambiguation)
- El Sur Ranch, California, US
- Sul
- Surr, a game played in India
