= Clock towers in Turkey =

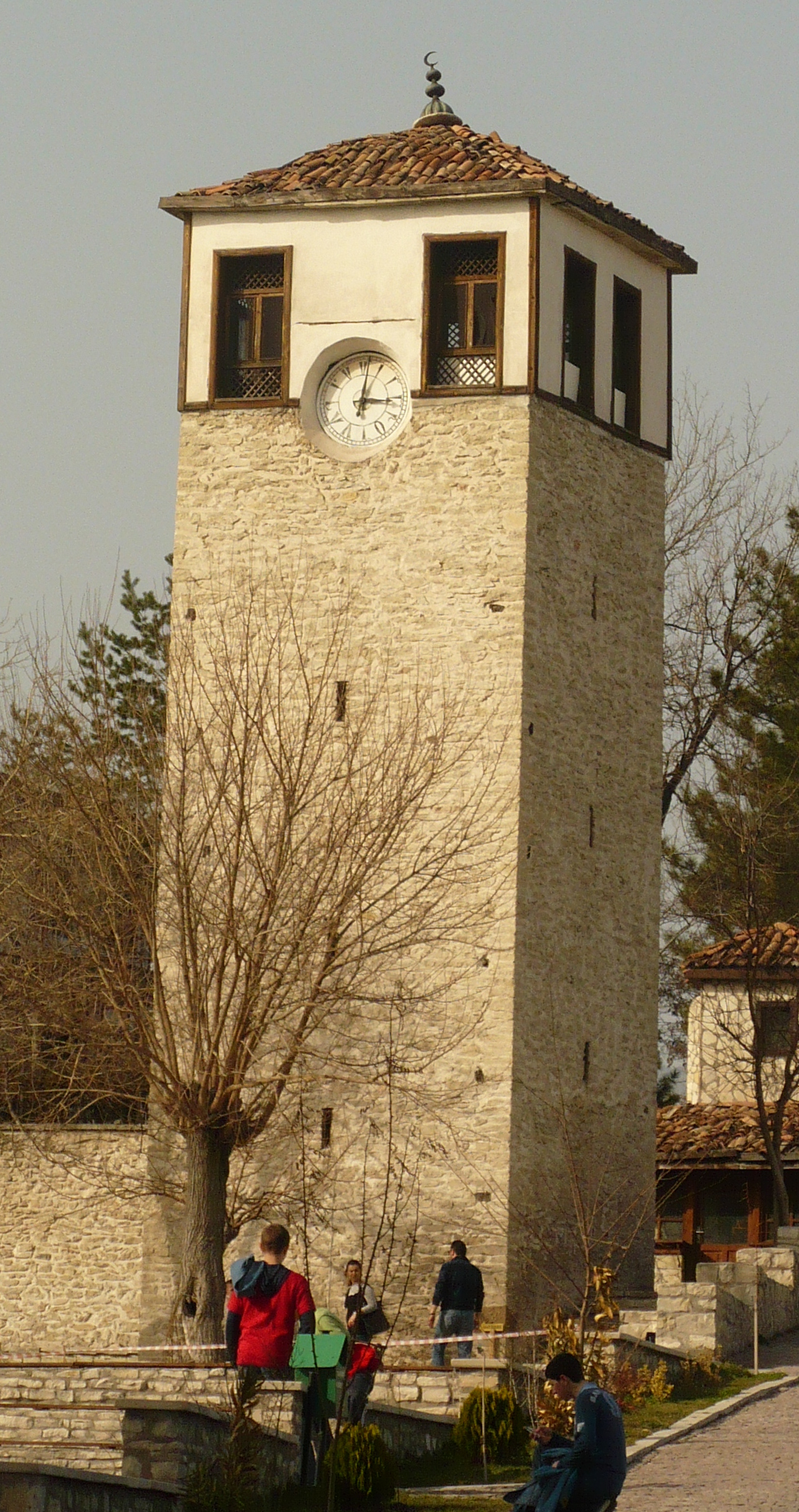
Safranbolu Clock Tower, the first clock tower built in Anatolia

The clock tower tradition first started in the 13th century Europe, and spread to the territory of the Ottoman Empire in the late 16th century and the first clock tower found today in Turkey was erected in 1797 in the Anatolian town of Safranbolu. Starting from the time of Mehmed the Conqueror, the Ottoman high class had used mechanical clocks, but the concept of a clock tower in the Ottoman Empire and the Anatolian region was introduced to the public much later compared to some countries in Europe, about which numerous comments and theories have been offered. While Abdülhak Adnan Adıvar attributes this to the concern that müezzins and timekeepers would have lost their importance, Bernard Lewis argues that the clock, like the printing press, might have caused cracks in the Islamic social fabric. Şule Gürbüz states that mechanical clocks do not necessarily show the correct time sometimes and the clock towers did not become widespread due to this error margin, as the timekeepers could calculate the time for prayer precisely. Numerous clock towers were built with the edicts published on Abdul Hamid II's 25th anniversary of ascension to the throne, and these edicts are considered an important threshold for the spread of the clock towers. Before Abdul Hamid II's reign, Ziya Pasha built many such towers during his governorship in Adana and Amasya.

The clock towers, which represented the central authority, were built in the center of the cities in which they were located, as in the examples of Antalya Clock Tower and İzmit Clock Tower. Bilecik Clock Tower, Bolu Clock Tower, Göynük Clock Tower, Kastamonu Clock Tower, Mudurnu Clock Tower, Sivrihisar Clock Tower, Bursa Tophane Clock Tower and Istanbul Tophane Clock Tower are built in a location or hillside overlooking the city. There are also clock towers, which are part of a building such as the Şişli Etfal Hospital Clock Tower, as well as those located within a complex, such as the Yıldız Clock Tower. In addition, Ali Çetinkaya Station Clock Tower, Alsancak Station Clock Tower, Ayvalık Clock Tower, Bergama Clock Tower, Gümüşhacıköy Clock Tower, Mersin Clock Tower, Merzifon American College Clock Tower, Sivas Gendarme Barracks Clock Tower, Şirinyer American College Clock Tower and Diyarbakır Hamidiye Clock Fountain are among the towers made to be compatible with the structure in which they are placed. Niğde Clock Tower, Sinop Clock Tower and Zile Clock Tower are examples of clock towers rising above historical castles. Hacı Pasha Clock Tower, which was created by adding a clock to an old factory chimney, and Tepsi Minaret, which was created by adding a clock to a minaret, are among the towers that were later turned into a clock tower. In addition, Çiçek Pasajı Front Clock, Galatasaray High School Roof Clock, Haydarpaşa Station Roof Clock and Sainte-Pulchérie French High School Roof Clock, which do not have a tower structure but are located at a high point of the building, are also usually included in the category of clock towers.

Most clock towers are made of stone, but there are also wooden towers such as Gerede Clock Tower and Mudurnu Clock Tower. Although some towers such as Dolmabahçe Clock Tower, Istanbul University Clock Towers and İzmir Clock Tower are important works with their own aesthetic appearance, most clock towers are structures that are in harmony with their surroundings despite being high or showy and built in accordance with the general characteristics of Islamic architecture.

In functional terms, besides showing the time, there are clock towers used as watchtowers like Samsun Clock Tower, as well as clock towers equipped with barometers and thermometers, as in the case of Dolmabahçe Clock Tower. Kayseri Clock Tower, Muğla Clock Tower, and Tokat Clock Tower are also used as temporary timekeeping locations for religious purposes, while many clock towers such as Çanakkale Clock Tower have a fountain on the base. Göynük Clock Tower, Manisa Clock Tower and Tepsi Minaret operate only with the alarm system without a dial.

Although there are many clock towers today, the number of towers that have had a remarkable quality is one hundred and twenty six. The city with the most clock towers is Istanbul with twenty towers, followed by İzmir with seven towers. As for the region, the Central Anatolia Region is the region with the highest number of clock towers. Twenty-three out of a hundred and twenty six towers are not standing today. Out of the demolished ones, eleven new clock towers were erected at the same spot of their original predecessors, and four were moved to a different spot or reconstructed at a different spot.

== Architecture and mechanism of clock towers in Turkey ==
Clock towers dated to the 19th century and the beginning of the 20th century and the newer clock towers made based on these examples generally consist of pedestal, trunk and mansion sections. There is a room in the base section and a staircase leading up to the trunk, a Z-shaped or spiral staircase in the trunk, and a clock machine in the upper section.

There is a small clock on the machine and this clock is connected up with a shaft. The shaft that provides the movement of the hour and minute hands on the dial also activates the clapper of the bell, if any exists. The weights, which are wound on the two rollers between the wheels of the machine and located at the ends of the two steel ropes, go up and down to ensure that the clock is set up and works properly. While the rope attached to the first reel enables the clock to work, the rope and weight attached to the second reel enables the rammer to hit the bell. The bell on the top of the mansion is covered with a dome or a cone and there are openings around the bell so that the sound reaches far.

The clocks are produced to ring based on the numerical number of each hour, although some just ring once regardless of what hour it is. Some clocks also ring every 30 minutes. Others ring twice at the start of each hour, with the ringings being one to two minutes apart. In order for them to continue working properly, clocks are checked every fifteen days or once a month depending on their features.

The timing system for the clock towers, which was set according to the adhan hours, was changed to show the normal timing system with the Law on 24-Hour Division of the Day issued in 1925. With the Law on the Use of International Numbers in 1928, the clocks expressed in Eastern Arabic numerals on the dials were replaced to show Arabic and Roman numerals, and in some cases both the old and new numerals were used on the dials.

== List of clock towers ==
=== Key ===
Red	Demolished
Blue	Rebuilt in the same spot after demolition
Green	Rebuilt or moved to a different spot after demolition

=== List ===
#	Name	Location	Constructed	Notes	Reference(s)
1	Adapazarı Clock Tower	Adapazarı, Sakarya	1882		
2	Akçakoca Clock Tower	Akçakoca, Düzce	1954		
3	Akdeniz University Olbia Cultural Center Clock Tower	Konyaaltı, Antalya	1999		
4	Alaca Clock Tower	Alaca, Çorum	2001		
5	Ali Çetinkaya Station Clock Tower	Afyonkarahisar, Afyonkarahisar	1939		
6	Alsancak Station Clock Tower	Konak, İzmir	1890	(Note: The clock in the tower was built in 1890, and it is estimated that the tower was built in the same year.)	
7	Altınoluk Central Mosque Clock Tower	Edremit, Balıkesir	1885	(Note: The clock tower erected in the old settlement of Altınoluk got demolished over time.)	
8	Amasya Clock Tower	Amasya, Amasya	2002	(Note: The original tower, built in 1865, was destroyed in 1940 when it was damaged during the earthquake in 1938, and the existing building was built in 2002, based on the original structure.)	
9	Ankara Clock Tower	Altındağ, Ankara	1884		
10	Antalya Clock Tower	Muratpaşa, Antalya	Unknown	(Note: The exact construction date of the clock tower, which is thought to have been built on the 25th anniversary of Abdul Hamid II's ascension to the throne, and dates back to the 19th century, is uncertain.)	
11	Atatürk Forest Farm and Zoo Directorate Building Clock Tower	Yenimahalle, Ankara	1926		
12	Church of Agia Fotini Clock Tower	Konak, İzmir	1892	(Note: The tower and the church, built with clocks mounted on the bell tower in 1793, are not standing today. The church building, which operates today with the same name, is a newer structure.)	
13	Ayios Konstantinos and Ayia Eleni Church Clock Tower	Beyoğlu, Istanbul	1861		
14	Ayvalık Clock Tower	Ayvalık, Balıkesir	1870		
15	Bahadın Clock Tower	Sorgun, Yozgat	Unknown		
16	Bakırköy Psychiatric Hospital Clock Tower	Bakırköy, Istanbul	1914	(Note: The tower went under the ground during the 1999 İzmit earthquake)	
17	Balıkesir Clock Tower	Karesi, Balıkesir	1901	(Note: The original tower, built in 1827, was destroyed during the earthquake in 1897, and the existing building was built in 1901.)	
18	Balıklı Greek Hospital Clock Tower	Zeytinburnu, Istanbul	1893		
19	Bartın Clock Tower	Bartın, Bartın	Unknown		
20	Batman Clock Tower	Batman, Batman	2003		
21	Bayburt Clock Tower	Bayburt, Bayburt	1924		
22	Bayramyeri Clock Tower	Konak, İzmir	1955		
23	Bergama Clock Tower	Bergama, İzmir	1865		
24	Beypazarı Clock Tower	Beypazarı, Ankara	1920	(Note: The clock tower erected at the entrance of Sulu Han got demolished over time.)	
25	Bilecik Clock Tower	Bilecik, Bilecik	1907		
26	Boğaziçi University Albert Long Hall Cultural Center Front Clock	Beşiktaş, Istanbul	1892	(Note: The clock tower was formed in 1892, after a clock was added on the front side of the existing building, originally built in 1862.)	
27	Bolu Clock Tower	Bolu, Bolu	1989	(Note: Although the exact date is not known, the original tower built before 1810 at the western end of the fortress was destroyed and the existing tower was erected in the park next to Yıldırım Bayezid Mosque in 1989.)	
28	Borsa Junction Clock Tower	Nevşehir, Nevşehir	1987		
29	Boyabat Clock Tower	Boyabat, Sinop	1983	(Note: Although there is no information about the tower in the archives of Boyabat Municipality, Samsun Cultural Heritage Preservation Regional Board Directorate and Sinop Provincial Culture and Tourism Directorate, it is suggested by some civilian sources that it was built between 1982 and 1983)	
30	Bozcaada Clock Tower	Bozcaada, Çanakkale	1867	(Note: The clock tower was formed by adding a clock to the bell tower of the Church of the Virgin Mary.)	
31	Burdur Clock Tower	Burdur, Burdur	1937	(Note: The original tower, built in 1830 or 1836, was destroyed during the earthquake in 1914, and the existing building was built in 1937.)	
32	Büyük Saat	Seyhan, Adana	1882		
33	Büyükada Clock Tower	Adalar, Istanbul	1923	(Note: While Meltem Cansever stated that the tower was erected in 1923, Hakkı Acun estimates that it was erected in 1912 together with Bostancı Pier.)	
34	Çanakkale Clock Tower	Çanakkale, Çanakkale	1896		
35	Çankırı Clock Tower	Çankırı, Çankırı	1901	(Note: The first clock tower at the point where the tower is located was built in 1869, and the existing clock tower, erected in 1901, was moved to its current location in 1948. The fate of the first clock tower is uncertain.)	
36	Çatalca Government House Clock Tower	Çatalca, Istanbul	Unknown	(Note: The government house, which is now used as the district gendarmerie command, was built in 1823 and it is thought that the tower was added to the building with the use of it as a government residence starting in 1940.)	
37	Çelebi Mehmet Madrasa Clock Tower	Merzifon, Amasya	1866		
38	Çerikli Clock Tower	Delice, Kırıkkale	1991		
39	Çınarcık Clock Tower	Çınarcık, Yalova	2005		
40	Çiçek Pasajı Front Clock	Beyoğlu, Istanbul	1876		
41	Çorum Clock Tower	Çorum, Çorum	1894	(Note: The tower was built in 1894 according to Çorum Provincial Directorate of Culture and Tourism and Meltem Cansever, or in 1896 according to Hakkı Acun.)	
42	Dolmabahçe Clock Tower	Beşiktaş, Istanbul	1894		
43	Düzce Clock Tower	Düzce, Düzce	2009	(Note: The original tower, which was erected near Cedidiye Avenue in 1901, was destroyed during the fire in 1925, and the existing building was built in Anıtpark Square in 2009.)	
44	Edirne Clock Tower	Edirne, Edirne	1886	(Note: The tower, built in 1886 on the Macedonian sign of Edirne Castle, which was built in the period of the Roman Emperor Hadrian, was damaged greatly after a fire. It was rebuilt in December 1893 at the same point, and it was destroyed again on 6 July 1953. Only the tower base remains today.)	
45	Erbaa Clock Tower	Erbaa, Tokat	1902		
46	Erzincan Military Middle School Clock Tower	Erzincan, Erzincan	1892	(Note: The tower was destroyed by the 1939 or 1940 earthquake.)	
47	Erzincan Fourth Army Document Cellar Clock Tower	Merkez, Erzincan	1892	(Note: The tower was destroyed in 1939.)	
48	Esenli Clock Tower	Merkez, Yozgat	1994		
49	Eskişehir Clock Tower	Odunpazarı, Eskişehir	Unknown	(Note: Although the exact date of construction is unknown, the upper part of the tower, which dated to the end of the 19th century and the beginning of the 20th century, was destroyed by the earthquake of 1928. The ruined tower was completely destroyed during the restoration of the Kursunlu Mosque in the following years, and the chimney of the imaret near the caravanserai was raised here in the 1940s.)	
50	Fuar Clock Tower	Konak, İzmir	1938		
51	Galatasaray High School Roof Clock	Beyoğlu, Istanbul	1908	(Note: The renovation of the building, which was damaged during the fire in 1870, was completed in 1908 and the clock is thought to have been added during these renovations.)	
52	Gelibolu Clock Tower	Gelibolu, Çanakkale	1901	(Note: It is estimated that the tower was destroyed during the Gallipoli campaign.)	
53	Gerede Clock Tower	Gerede, Bolu	1882		
54	Gerze Clock Tower	Gerze, Sinop	Unknown	(Note: Although there is no information about the tower in the archives of Gerze Municipality, Samsun Cultural Heritage Preservation Regional Board Directorate and Sinop Provincial Culture and Tourism Directorate, it is estimated that it was built between 1980 and 1981. Today, there is a model of a Gerze rooster at the point where the tower was once standing.)	
55	Göynük Clock Tower	Göynük, Bolu	1923		
56	Gümüşhacıköy Clock Tower	Gümüşhacıköy, Amasya	2009	(Note: After the original tower built in 1900 was destroyed during the earthquake in 1943, another wooden tower was built in the same place in 1948, even though this tower was demolished in 1971, and the tower that replaced it was also demolished later. The tower that stands there today was erected in 2009.)	
57	Hacı Pasha Clock Tower	Silifke, Mersin	2007	(Note: The building, which was built as the chimney of the Hacı Pasha Flour Factory in 1896, was restored in 2007 and turned into a clock tower.)	
58	Hamidiye Clock Fountain	Yenişehir, Diyarbakır	Unknown	(Note: Although it is thought that it was built with Hamidiye Industrial School in 1900 in honor of the 25th anniversary of Abdul Hamid II's ascension to the throne, the exact date of construction is uncertain. It is estimated that it was destroyed within the first years of the Republic's establishment.)	
59	Hamidiye Clock Fountain	Yozgat, Yozgat	1901	(Note: The tower was built in 1899 according to Meltem Cansever, 1900 according to Yozgat Provincial Culture and Tourism Directorate, and 1901 according to Hakkı Acun.)	
60	Havza Clock Tower	Havza, Samsun	Unknown	(Note: Since there is no information about the tower in the archives of Samsun Provincial Culture and Tourism Directorate and Samsun Cultural Heritage Preservation Regional Board Directorate, the construction and demolition dates are unknown.)	
61	Haydarpaşa Station Roof Clock	Kadıköy, Istanbul	1908		
62	İskenderun Justice Palace Clock Tower	İskenderun, Hatay	1925		
63	Istanbul University Clock Towers	Fatih, Istanbul	1865		
64	İzmir Clock Tower	Konak, İzmir	1901		
65	İzmit Clock Tower	İzmit, Kocaeli	1903		
66	Karabük Clock Tower	Karabük, Karabük	1987		
67	Karaman Clock Tower	Karaman, Karaman	2009		
68	Kars Public Education Center Clock Tower	Kars, Kars	2003		
69	Okmeydanı Training and Research Hospital Kasımpaşa Building Clock Tower	Beyoğlu, Istanbul	Unknown	(Note: Although it is known that the building was completed in 1838 and the original clock was made in 1859, the exact date of construction of the tower is unknown.)	
70	Kastamonu Command Building Clock Tower	Kastamonu, Kastamonu	Unknown	(Note: Although it is thought that it was built on the 25th anniversary of Abdul Hamid II's ascension to the throne, the exact date of construction is uncertain.)	
71	Kastamonu Clock Tower	Kastamonu, Kastamonu	1885		
72	Kayseri Clock Tower	Melikgazi, Kayseri	1907		
73	Kemer Clock Tower	Kemer, Antalya	2006		
74	Konya Clock Tower	Karatay, Konya	1872	(Note: The clock tower was built during the renovation of the building, which was originally built as a chapel during the Byzantine Empire but later turned into a mosque. It was demolished in 1921.)	
75	Kumkapı Clock Tower	Fatih, Istanbul	Unknown	(Note: Although it is thought that it was built on the 25th anniversary of Abdul Hamid II's acension to the throne, the exact date of construction and the date of demolition are uncertain.)	
76	Kurtalan Clock Tower	Kurtalan, Siirt	1999		
77	Kuşadası Clock Tower	Kuşadası, Aydın	1996		
78	Küre Clock Tower	Küre, Kastamonu	Unknown	(Note: The tower was destroyed as a result of the fire in 1886.)	
79	Kütahya Clock Tower	Kütahya, Kütahya	2006	(Note: The original tower, built in the 1880s, was demolished in the early 1970s. The existing structure was built in 2005 and 2006, based on the original building.)	
80	Ladik Clock Tower	Ladik, Samsun	1889		
81	Maden Clock Tower	Maden, Elazığ	1898		
82	Manisa Clock Tower	Şehzadeler, Manisa	1975	(Note: The original tower, formed with the clock added in 1672 on the northern door protrusion of the Great Mosque of Manisa (completed in 1366), was destroyed after sixty years, and the existing building was built in 1975 in front of the crown gate of the mosque.)	
83	Mardin Clock Tower	Artuklu, Mardin	2003	(Note: The original tower, built in 1902, was demolished as part of the road works in 1930, and the existing building was built in 2003, based on the original structure.)	
84	Marmara University School of Medicine Clock Towers	Kadıköy, Istanbul	1900		
85	Mecitözü Clock Tower	Mecitözü, Çorum	1899		
86	Mehmet Akif Ersoy Museum House Clock Tower	Altındağ, Ankara	2008		
87	Mersin Clock Tower	Akdeniz, Mersin	1898	(Note: The clock tower was created by adding a clock to the tower of the St. Anthony Latin Catholic Church.)	
88	Anatolia College in Merzifon Clock Tower	Merzifon, Amasya	1919		
89	Merzifon Clock Tower	Merzifon, Amasya	1866		
90	Mudurnu Clock Tower	Mudurnu, Bolu	1964	(Note: The original tower built in 1891 was destroyed during the fire in 1900. Although another tower was built at the same spot in 1905, this tower was also damaged during a fire in 1964 and was repaired the same year.)	
91	Muğla Clock Tower	Menteşe, Muğla	1885		
92	Niğde Clock Tower	Niğde, Niğde	1866		
93	Ondokuzmayıs Clock Tower	Ondokuzmayıs, Samsun	1987		
94	Osmaniye Clock Tower	Osmaniye, Osmaniye	1999		
95	Panagia Evangelistria Church Clock Tower	Beyoğlu, Istanbul	1893		
96	Safranbolu Clock Tower	Safranbolu, Karabük	1797		
97	Sainte-Pulchérie French High School Roof Clock	Beyoğlu, Istanbul	1890		
98	Samsun Clock Tower	İlkadım, Samsun	2001	(Note: The original tower built in 1886 was destroyed during the earthquake in 1944. Even though another tower was built in the same spot in 1977, this tower was also destroyed and the new building was built in 2001, remaining true to the original structure.)	
99	Siirt Clock Tower	Siirt, Siirt	1975	(Note: The original tower built in 1905 was demolished and the existing building was built in 1975.)	
100	Sinop Clock Tower	Sinop, Sinop	1901		
101	Sirkeci Station Clock Towers	Fatih, Istanbul	1890		
102	Sivas Clock Tower	Sivas, Sivas	1803	(Note: The tower was built in 1803 according to Sivas Cultural Heritage Protection Regional Board Directorate registration information and İbrahim Olcaytu or 1814 according to Ömer Demirel. It was demolished in 1944.)	
103	Sivas Gendarmerie Barracks Clock Tower	Sivas, Sivas	1908		
104	Sivrihisar Clock Tower	Sivrihisar, Eskişehir	1900		
105	Sungurlu Clock Tower	Sungurlu, Çorum	1891	(Note: While Meltem Cansever states that the tower was erected in 1891 or 1892, Hakkı Acun states that it was erected in 1891.)	
106	Şanlıurfa Clock Tower	Eyyübiye, Şanlıurfa	Unknown	(Note: The clock tower was formed when the clock was added to the minaret of the Great Mosque of Şanlıurfa (completed in 1175), in a period between 1927-1945.)	
107	Şefaatli Clock Tower	Şefaatli, Yozgat	1986		
108	Şehitler Clock Tower	Niksar, Tokat	2008		
109	Şirinyer American College Clock Tower	Buca, İzmir	1912		
110	Etfal Hospital Clock Tower	Şişli, Istanbul	1907		
111	Tarsus Clock Tower	Tarsus, Mersin, Mersin	1893		
112	Tekirdağ Clock Tower	Süleymanpaşa, Tekirdağ	Unknown	(Note: Although the exact date of construction is unknown, it is estimated that it was built at the end of the 19th century. It was demolished in 1912.)	
113	Tepsi Minaret	Yakutiye, Erzurum	Unknown	(Note: Although the minaret structure was completed between 1124 and 1132, the exact date of completion is unknown, but it was used as a clock tower before 1843.)	
114	Tokat Clock Tower	Tokat, Tokat	1902		
115	Tophane Clock Tower	Beyoğlu, Istanbul	1849		
116	Tophane Clock Tower	Osmangazi, Bursa	1905		
117	Trabzon Clock Tower	Ortahisar, Trabzon	1863	(Note: The clock tower was formed by adding a clock to the bell tower of the Ayos Grigoryos Church. It was destroyed in the 1940s.)	
118	Turgutlu Clock Tower	Turgutlu, Manisa	Unknown	(Note: Although the exact date of construction is unknown, it is known that it was built in the early 2000s.)	
119	Ürgüp Clock Tower	Ürgüp, Nevşehir	2006		
120	Vezirköprü Clock Tower	Vezirköprü, Samsun	1959	(Note: The original tower, built in 1908, was largely damaged during the earthquake in 1943, and was restored in 1959, based on the original.)	
121	Yenişehir Clock Tower	Yenişehir, Bursa	1936	(Note: It was built in 1936 after the original tower built in 1906 was heavily damaged during Greco-Turkish War (1919–1922).)	
122	Yerköy Clock Tower	Yerköy, Yozgat	1986		
123	Yeşilli Clock Tower	Yeşilli, Mardin	Unknown	(Note: Since there is no information about the tower in the archives of the Diyarbakır Cultural Heritage Preservation Regional Board Directorate, the construction date remains unknown.)	
124	Yıldız Clock Tower	Beşiktaş, Istanbul	1890		
125	Yozgat Clock Tower	Yozgat, Yozgat	1908	(Note: It was built in 1897 according to some sources.)	
126	Yüreğir Clock Tower	Yüreğir, Adana	2008		
127	Zile Clock Tower	Zile, Tokat	1875	(Note: The clock tower was formed with the clock added in 1875 to the minaret built in 1336.)	
