= Bernardo Baras =

Argentine actor

Bernardo Baras is an Argentine actor who has appeared in films and TV in Argentina since 1982.

He has acted in films such as the 1988 Victor Dinenzon film, Abierto de 18 a 24 alongside actors Gerardo Romano and Horacio Peña.

His last appearance was in 2004.
