= Sur, Iran (disambiguation) =

Sur, Iran is a village in Lorestan Province, Iran.

Sur or Sowr (Persian: سور) in Iran may also refer to:

- Sur, Fars
- Sur, Hamadan
- Sur, Isfahan
- Sur, Darmian, South Khorasan Province
- Sur, Qaen, South Khorasan Province

== See also ==
- Sur (disambiguation)
