= Al filo de la ley =

Al filo de la ley may refer to:

- Al filo de la ley (1992 film), an Argentine action thriller film
- Al filo de la ley (2015 film), a Peruvian buddy cop action film
