= Sul =

Sul or SUL may refer to:

== Places ==
- South Region, Brazil
- Sul, Portugal, a village in Portugal
- Sul, Fars, a village in Iran
- Sul, Hormozgan, a village in Iran

== Other uses ==
- Sul (deity), or Sulis, a Celtic goddess
- Sul (Korean surname)
- Surigaonon language (ISO 639 code sul)
- Stanford University Libraries
- Sul, a Dutch profanity
- Sul, Italian for "on the", used to denote playing technique in music as in sul ponticello (on the bridge), sul tasto (on the fingerboard), or sul E (on the E string) etc.

== See also ==
- Sool
- Sule (disambiguation)
- Sur
