= Gerardo Romano =

Argentine actor (born 1946)

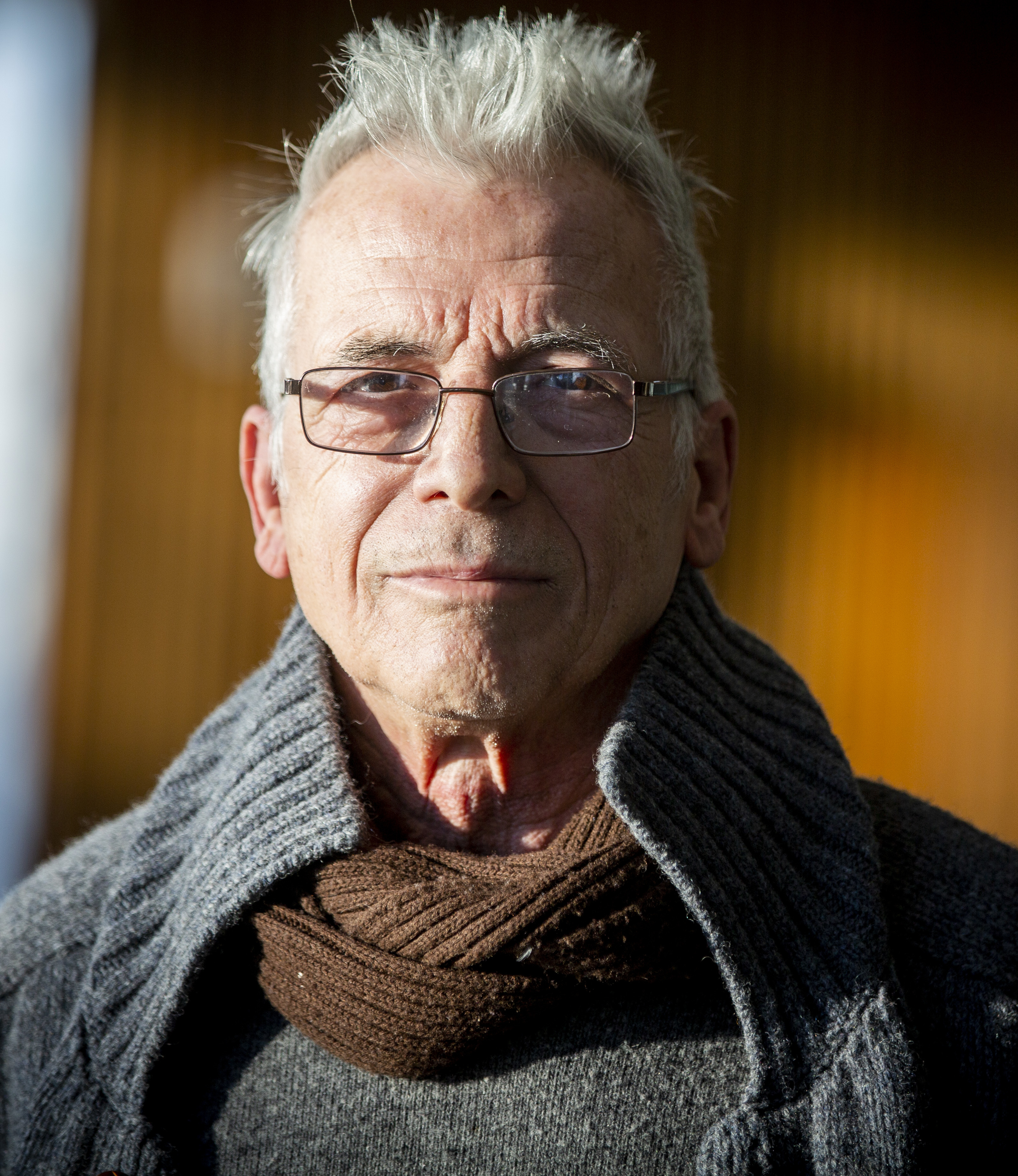
- Gerardo Romano en 2021.
- Born: 6 July 1946 (age 80); Argentina
- Occupations: actor, lawyer

Gerardo Romano (born 6 July 1946) is an Argentine actor who has made some 45 appearances in mainstream film and television in Argentina since 1979. He is widely regarded as one of Argentina's leading actors.

Romano has mostly appeared on famous television series in Argentina since 1979, making his acting debut in El Fausto criollo, although he has acted in a number of films such as the 1988 Victor Dinenzon film, Abierto de 18 a 24 and the 1994 film El Amante de las Peliculas Mudas.

In 1992, he played the role of the swindler Raúl Fontana in the action thriller Al Filo de la Ley (On the Edge of the Law) about a hotel in Miami. He also appeared in Spanish film director Carlos Saura's TV film El Sur, which is based on the short story El Sur by Argentine author Jorge Luis Borges.

In 1996, Gerardo appeared in the crime thriller Policia corrupto' known as Corrupt Police. He portrayed the character of Eduardo Romero.

Then in 2001, he starred in the internationally acclaimed La Fuga, playing the role of Julio Bordiola, set in the late 1920s. He worked under the direction of one of the leading Argentine film directors, Eduardo Mignogna and with actors Ricardo Darin, Patricio Contreras and Miguel Angel Sola. The film received 5 awards and 11 nominations.

That same year, Romano starred in Nada por Perder, in which he portrayed the character of Luis Bustamante.

In 2004, Gerardo Romano appeared in Dos Ilusiones.

== Selected filmography ==
- 1979, El Fausto criollo
- 1984, Atrapadas, Nacho
- 1985, Los Gatos
- 1986, Miss Mary
- 1987, El año del conejo, Las esclavas, Entregador
- 1988, Abierto de 18 a 24, La clínica loca
- 1990, Cuerpos perdidos, Negra medianoche, Yo, la peor de todas
- 1992, Al Filo de la Ley
- 1992, El Sur
- 1993, Las boludas
- 1994, El amante de las películas mudas
- 1996, Policía corrupto
- 2001, La fuga, Nada por perder
- 2004, Dos ilusiones
- 2016, El Marginal
- 2025, El secreto con Ana María Picchio.
