= Horacio Peña (actor) =

Argentine actor

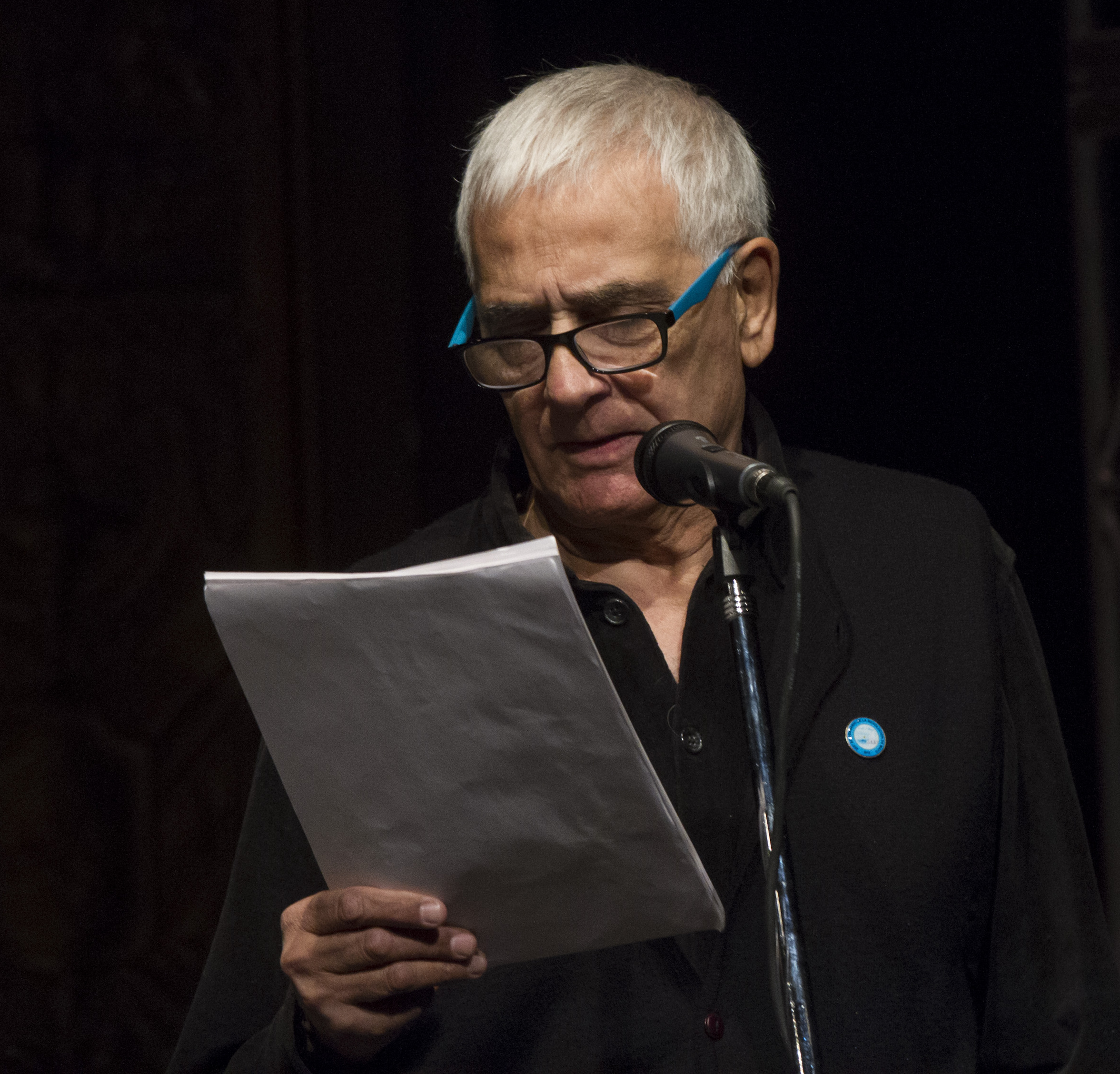
Horacio Peña in 2016

Horacio Peña (born 1943) is an Argentine actor who has appeared in films and TV in Argentina since 1966.

He has made about 30 appearances to date mostly in film acting in films such as the 1988 Victor Dinenzon film, Abierto de 18 a 24 alongside actor Gerardo Romano. In the 1990s his career seemed to concentrate more in television but since 2000 he has been known primarily as a film actor in Argentina.
