= Two Waters =

Two Waters may refer to:

- Two Waters, Hertfordshire, a district of Hemel Hempstead, Hertfordshire, England
- The Two Waters, 1988 Argentine drama film
