= Juan Carlos Desanzo =

Argentine cinematographer (1938–2026

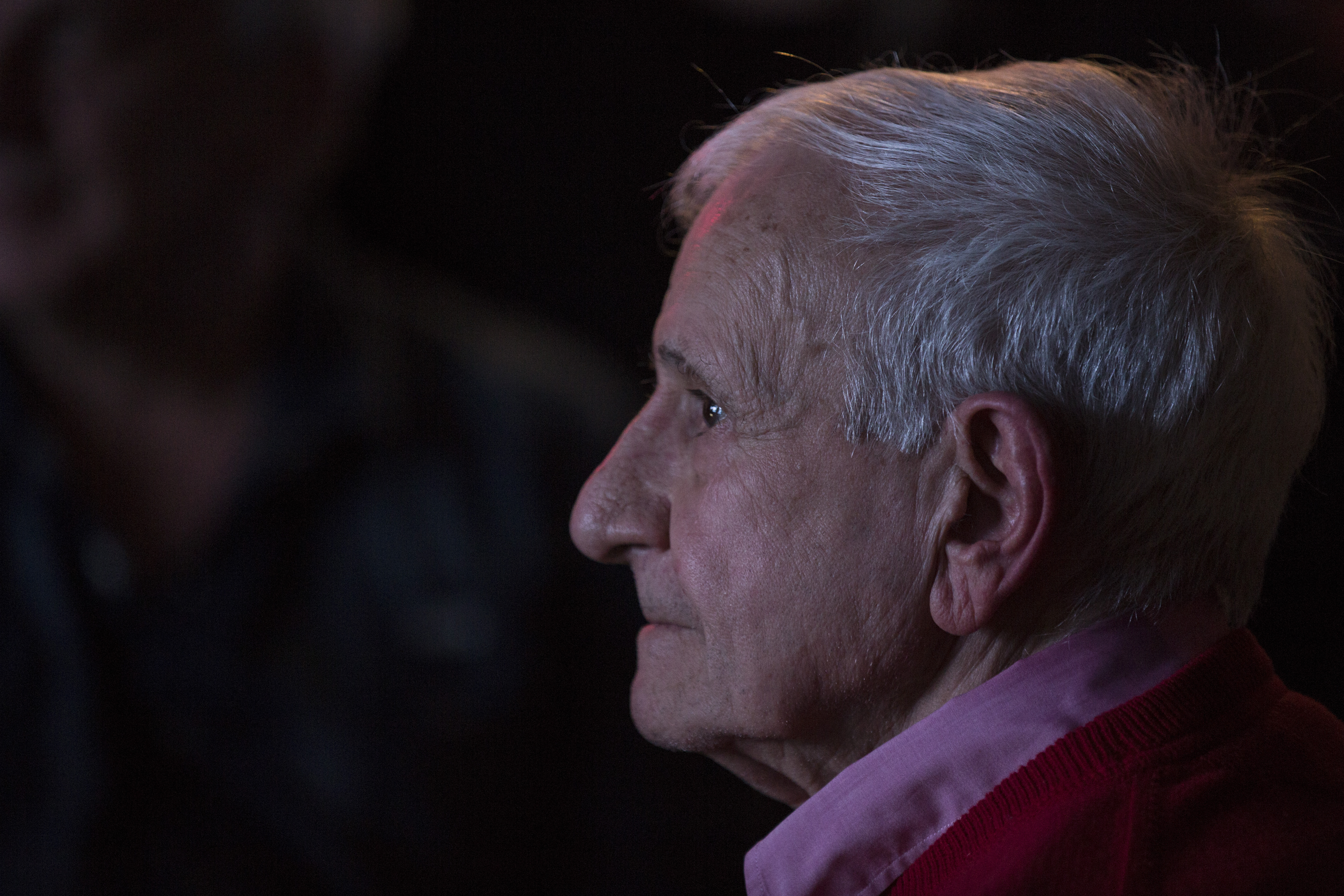
- Desanzo in 2016
- Born: January 15, 1938; Buenos Aires, Argentina
- Died: February 16, 2026 (aged 88); Buenos Aires, Argentina
- Occupations: Cinematographer, film director, screenwriter

Juan Carlos Desanzo (January 15, 1938 – February 16, 2026) was an Argentine film director, screenwriter and cinematographer. He died on February 16, 2026, at the age of 88.

== Filmography ==
=== Director ===
- El desquite (1983)
- En retirada (1984)
- La búsqueda (1985)
- At the Edge of the Law (1992)
- Eva Perón: The True Story (1996)
- Hasta la victoria siempre (1997)
- La venganza (1999)
- El amor y el espanto (2001)
- El Polaquito (2003)
- Verano amargo (2009)

=== Screenwriter ===
- El desquite (1983)
- En retirada (1984)
- At the Edge of the Law (1992)
- Y Pegue Carlos, Pegue (1995)
- La venganza (1999)

=== Cinematographer ===
- Aysa (1964)
- La hora de los Hornos (1968)
- Tango Argentino (1969)
- The Players vs. Ángeles Caídos (1969)
- El Habilitado (1970)
- Crónica de una Señora (1971)
- Un Guapo del 900 (1971)
- Heroína (1972)
- Juan Moreira (1973)
- La Revolución (1973)
- Gente en Buenos Aires (1974)
- Los Gauchos Judíos (1974)
- La Tregua (1974)
- La Gran Aventura (1974)
- Los Hijos de Fierro (1975)
- El muerto (1975)
- No Toquen a la Nena (1976)
- La Aventura Explosiva (1976)
- Un Idilio de Estación (1978)
- El fantástico mundo de la María Montiel (1978)
- Los superagentes no se rompen (1979)
- El lugar del humo (1979)
- El infierno tan temido (1980)
- Subí que te llevo (1980)
- Los pasajeros del jardín (1982)
- Pubis angelical (1982)
- Funes, a Great Love (1993)
- Potuto (2021)
