= Sule =

Sule may refer to:

== Places ==
- Sule (river), a river of Lower Saxony, Germany
- Sule Skerry, a skerry in the North Atlantic off the north coast of Scotland
- Sule Stack, a stack in the North Atlantic off the north coast of Scotland
- Punta Sulè, a mountain of the Graian Alps in Italy
- Sule, a former name of Kashgar, an oasis city in western Xinjiang, China
- Sule Pagoda, a pagoda in Myanmar

== People with the name ==
=== Sule ===
- Abdel Rahman Sule, South Sudanese politician
- Abdul Sule (born 1975), former Nigerian football player and current Player Agent
- Abdullahi Sule (born 1959), Nigerian entrepreneur, businessman and politician
- Anselmo Sule (1934–2002), Chilean politician, member of the Radical Party and afterwards of the Social Democrat Radical Party
- Baba Sule (born 1978), Ghanaian retired footballer
- Cole Shade Sule (born 1980), Cameroonian former swimmer
- Fuad Sule (born 1997), Irish-Nigerian professional footballer
- Gloria Ojulari Sule (1950–2024) British artist and educator
- Gustav Sule (1910–1942), Estonian javelin thrower
- Harvey Alexander-Sule, English rapper and actor
- Niklas Süle (born 1995), German footballer
- Maitama Sule (1929–2017), Nigerian politician, diplomat, and statesman
- Olayinka Sule, Administrator of Jigawa State, Nigeria from 1991 to 1992
- Rofiat Sule, Nigerian footballer
- Sule Ahman, Military Administrator of Enugu State, Nigeria from 1996 to 1998
- Sule Ladipo (born 1974), former tennis player from Nigeria
- Sule Lamido (born 1948), Foreign minister of Nigeria from 1999 to 2003
- Sule Utura (born 1990), Ethiopian middle and long-distance runner
- Supriya Sule, Indian politician from the Nationalist Congress Party
- Zsolt Süle (born 1969), Hungarian singer-songwriter and part-time cook
- Sule (comedian) (born 1976), Indonesian comedian

=== Şule ===
- Şule Azra Akbulut (born 2003), Turkish female karateka
- Şule Gürbüz (born 1974), Turkish author, poet and clockmaker
- Şule Kut, head of the department of International Relations at the Istanbul Bilgi University
- Şule Şahbaz (born 1978), Turkish weightlifter
- Şule Yüksel Şenler (1938-2019), Cypriot-born Turkish writer and journalist
