= El amor y el espanto =

2001 film by Juan Carlos Desanzo

- Theatrical release poster
- Directed by: Juan Carlos Desanzo
- Written by: José Pablo Feinmann
- Produced by: Isidro Miguel
- Starring: Miguel Ángel Solá; Víctor Laplace; Norman Briski; Roberto Carnaghi
- Cinematography: Carlos Torlaschi
- Edited by: Sergio Zottola
- Music by: Martín Bianchedi
- Distributed by: Argentina Video Home
- Release date: 17 May 2001
- Running time: 110 minutes
- Country: Argentina
- Language: Spanish
- Budget: $650,000 (estimate)

El amor y el espanto (Love and Dread) is a 2001 Argentine drama film directed by Juan Carlos Desanzo and written by José Pablo Feinmann. It stars Miguel Ángel Solá, Blanca Oteyza and Victor Laplace.

== Cast ==
- Miguel Ángel Solá as Jorge Luis Borges
- Blanca Oteyza as Beatriz Viterbo
- Víctor Laplace as Carlos Daneri
- Norman Briski as Erik Lönnrot
- Roberto Carnaghi as Pierre Menard
- Alicia Berdaxágar as Borges' Mother
- Cristina Banegas as Owner of the boarding house
- Roly Serrano as Alejandro Villari
- Jean Pierre Reguerraz as Otto Dietrich
- Víctor Bruno as Bartender
- José María López as Funes
- Jorge Ochoa as Librarian

== Production and release ==
The film premiered in Argentina on 17 May 2001. It was produced with an estimated budget of $650,000.
