= Katja Alemann =

Argentine actress and writer

- Born: Buenos Aires, Argentina
- Occupation(s): Actress and writer
- Known for: Reciclarte, an organization for artists and recycling

Katja Alemann is an Argentine actress and writer.

== Biography ==
Katja Alemann is the stepsister of the former Minister of Economy, Roberto Alemann. She was married to Omar Chabán, and worked with him to open the Cemento nightclub in 1985. She appeared at the inauguration dressed in a Valkyrie costume, accompanied by a chariot with horses. Their marriage ended in 2001. Alemann posed in 1987 for the Argentine edition of Playboy magazine; the photos were released the following year. In 1989, as she had become even more famous, Playboy released the unused photos from the previous photo session. Alemann sued the magazine for the unauthorized commercial use of the photos, asking for their payment as if she had posed for a second time.

Alemann was the lead actress of La última mirada (The last sight), a 2011 film about the Dirty War. The movie was directed by Jorge Víctor Ruiz, who had already worked with Alemann in the 1990s, and included the actors Arturo Bonín, Eugeni Roig and Victoria Almeida. Her character is named Sonia, and suffers from survivor guilt. She worked the following year in El amigo alemán (The German friend), also about the Dirty War. She was involved in a car crash in 2012 at José León Suárez, and was taken to the San Isidro hospital.

In 2009, Omar Chaban was imprisoned for the 2004 República Cromañón nightclub fire. She met him again in a restaurant in March 2012, when he was released from prison; this meeting was filmed and aired on TV. Alemann accused the TV channel of not respecting her privacy rights. She initially had a favourable result, and got an indemnification of 40,000 pesos. However, the Supreme Court repealed the decision, ruling that Omar Chabán was a public figure, and the filmed event was of public interest. Alemann visited him again in August 2013, when Chaban was at the Santojani hospital.

== Works ==
=== Filmography ===
- El amigo alemán (2012)
- La última mirada (2011)
- Palabra por palabra (2007)
- Flores amarillas en la ventana (1996)
- Al filo de la ley (1992)
- Ya no hay hombres (1991)
- Las puertitas del Sr. López (1988)
- El año del conejo (1987)
- Seguridad personal (1985)
- Crucero de placer (1980)

=== Theater ===
- Taller Mecánico
- 8 mujeres
- El hombre que salía del piano
- Ya no pienso en matambre ni le temo al vacio
- Kabaret líquido
- Muero por ella

=== Books ===
- Cuentos del Boulevard
- Eroticamente
- Dos Mil Sin Cuenta
