= A Shadow You Soon Will Be =

1994 film

- Spanish: Una sombra ya pronto serás
- Directed by: Héctor Olivera
- Written by: Héctor Olivera
- Produced by: Fernando Ayala
- Starring: Miguel Ángel Solá
- Cinematography: Félix Monti; Eduardo López
- Edited by: Eduardo López
- Music by: Osvaldo Montes
- Release date: 5 May 1994
- Running time: 105 minutes
- Country: Argentina
- Language: Spanish

A Shadow You Soon Will Be (Spanish: Una sombra ya pronto serás) is a 1994 Argentine drama film directed by Héctor Olivera. The film was entered into the main competition at the 51st edition of the Venice Film Festival. It was also selected as the Argentine entry for the Best Foreign Language Film at the 67th Academy Awards, but was not accepted as a nominee.

== Cast ==
- Miguel Ángel Solá as Ingeniero (as Miguel Angel Sola)
- José Soriano as Coluccini (as Pepe Soriano)
- Martín Coria as Encargado surtidor
- Roberto Carnaghi as Cura Salinas
- Hernán Jiménez as Rubio (as Hernan Gimenez)
- Pedro Segni as Petiso
- Mario Lozano as Patrón Bar
- Alfonso De Grazia as Maldonado

== See also ==
- List of submissions to the 67th Academy Awards for Best Foreign Language Film
- List of Argentine submissions for the Academy Award for Best Foreign Language Film
