= Salvador Mazza =

Argentine physician and epidemiologist

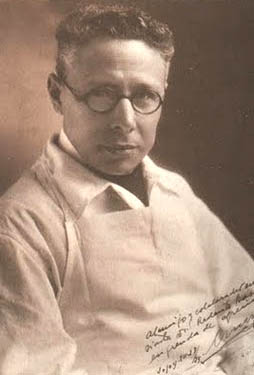
- Born: June 6, 1886; Buenos Aires, Argentina
- Died: November 9, 1946 (aged 60); Monterrey, Mexico
- Education: University of Buenos Aires
- Known for: American trypanosomiasis
- Scientific career
- Fields: Physician; Epidemiology

Salvador Mazza (June 6, 1886 – November 9, 1946) was a noted Argentine physician and epidemiologist, best known for his strides in helping control American trypanosomiasis, an endemic disease among the rural, poor majority of early 20th century South America.

== Life and work ==
=== Early career ===
Mazza was born in Retiro, Buenos Aires, to Francesco Mazza and Giuseppa Alfisi (both immigrants from Sicily), in 1886, and was raised in Rauch, a small pampas town. A precocious student, Mazza was accepted into the prestigious, public college preparatory school, the Colegio Nacional de Buenos Aires, at age ten. Upon graduation he applied for enlistment in the Argentine Naval Academy; but was rejected on medical grounds. He enrolled, instead, at the University of Buenos Aires (UBA) School of Medicine, graduating in 1903.

During his graduate studies, he accepted a post as Health Inspector for the then-rural Province of Buenos Aires, where he focused on disease prevention and vaccination. Following his 1903 graduation, he specialized in microbiology and pathology. He organized and briefly directed the quarantine facility for cholera-stricken seafarers and immigrants on Martín García Island, and then performed his medical residency in a number of European hospitals before earning his degree of Doctor of Medicine and returning to Argentina, in 1910. He then met a fellow Italian Argentine, Clorinda Brígida Razori, and they married in 1914—creating a lasting professional partnership, as well as marriage.

The onset of World War I returned Mazza to Europe, where he was commissioned in 1916 by the Argentine Army to study the crisis of infectious disease in the German and Austro-Hungarian Empires. There, he befriended a well-known Brazilian epidemiologist, Carlos Chagas, who in 1909 had discovered American trypanosomiasis. Mazza was named Laboratories Director of the Clinical Hospital and Dean of the Bacteriology Course at the UBA, in 1920. Traveling to France in 1923, he and his wife accepted noted bacteriologist Charles Nicolle's invitation to the Pasteur Institute's Algiers branch, where they studied Dr. Nicolle's methods in the treatment of typhus (Nicolle was later awarded the Nobel Prize in Medicine for his efforts). Returning to Argentina in 1925, Mazza was given a prominent post in the UBA Surgical Clinic and shortly afterwards invited Nicolle to Buenos Aires, where they discussed the need for more vigorous action against the contagious diseases affecting the country's poor.

=== Struggle against disease and indifference ===
These discussions resulted in support from the school's Dean of Anatomy, Dr. José Arce, for the establishment of a medical mission in Argentina's underdeveloped north. The Regional Pathologies Study Mission (MEPRA) was established in then-feudal Jujuy Province, in February 1926. Installed in a railway car, Mazza laboratory undertook studies on trypanosomiasis and leishmaniasis, among other diseases. Publishing regular reports, the mobile lab traveled from village to village to not only inform the then-mostly illiterate population of the nature of their common diseases; but also to help control the known disease vector Triatoma infestans, a true bug (Hemiptera) known locally as the winchuka (vinchuca). The death of a symptomatic dog in 1926 ultimately led to Mazza's confirmation of the existence of the causal pathogen, Trypanosoma cruzi, in Argentina, in 1927.

Mazza established Scientific Societies in seven northern provinces in 1926-27 to help coordinate his studies and diffuse information. He was assisted by, among others, Dr. Guillermo Paterson, an English Argentine epidemiologist known for his work on malaria. His efforts, however, encountered indifference and, then, resistance from the area's landed gentry, who generally saw squalor and contagious disease as an externality, and feared that Mazza's efforts might trigger a peasant revolt. His campaign to incinerate rural thatched roofs, a habitat for vinchucas, was particularly controversial. A fascist, 1930 coup d'état against the aging President Hipólito Yrigoyen, moreover, led to the elimination of funding for the MEPRA the following year, after which Mazza maintained the facility with donations and his own funds. His efforts forced the South American medical community to accept the validity of trypanosomiasis (making it the special topic of the prestigious VI National Congress of Medicine, in 1939), and yielded the first detailed description of the dynamic between living conditions, trypanosomiasis, and its insect vector.

A letter in 1942 to the renowned Scottish scientist, Dr. Alexander Fleming, led to his cooperation in the 1943 establishment of the first Argentine penicillin manufacturer - despite ongoing government refusal of support. The struggling MEPRA had, by 1944, published 551 articles in peer-reviewed journals (including 482 by Mazza, himself). He was then invited to the First International Brucellosis Congress, in Monterrey, Mexico, in November 1946.

On November 9, 1946, Dr. Salvador Mazza suffered a sudden, severe attack of hypotension, which resulted in his death at age 60. His death was the likely result of trypanosomiasis, the disease he had largely succeeded in controlling in Argentina.

MEPRA remained in operation until persistent budget cuts forced the closure of its last laboratory, a two-room facility in the La Paternal section of Buenos Aires, in 1959. The story was dramatized for the Argentine cinema in 1995 by Juan Bautista Stagnaro's Casas de fuego ("Houses of Fire"), in which the renowned epidemiologist was portrayed by Miguel Ángel Solá.

== Popular culture ==
In March 2020, John Oliver mentioned Salvador Mazza on his show Last Week Tonight.
