= El Fausto criollo =

- Directed by: Luis Saslavsky; Miguel Ángel Lumaldo
- Written by: Luis Saslavsky; Estela Canto; Luisa Mercedes Levinson; Enrique Anderson Imbert
- Starring: Claudio García Satur; María del Carmen Valenzuela; Pedro Quartucci; Luisa Vehil; Eva Franco
- Edited by: Armando Blanco
- Music by: Victor Proncet
- Release date: 25 October 1979
- Running time: 90 minutes
- Country: Argentina
- Language: Spanish

El Fausto criollo ("The Creole Faust") is a 1979 Argentine fantasy drama film directed by Luis Saslavsky and Miguel Angel Lumaldo. It was written by Saslavsky with the collaboration of Estela Canto, Luisa Mercedes Levinson and Enrique Anderson Imbert, and based on the novel El Fausto Criollo, by Estanislao del Campo. It stars Claudio García Satur, María Valenzuela, Pedro Quartucci, Luisa Vehil and Gerardo Romano. Oscar Aráiz was in charge of the film's choreography. It was filmed in Eastmancolor and released on October 25, 1979.

== Synopsis ==
Anastasio, a.k.a. "El Pollo" (The Chicken), narrates to a gaucho named Laguna the performance of the opera Faust, which he has just seen on a representation at a Buenos Aires theatre. Suddenly real life and fiction intersperse, with Anastasio imagining a similar story in La Pampa, while assuming the personality of the protagonist at the moment when the character signs his pact with the Devil.

== Cast ==
- Claudio García Satur
- Daniel Fanego
- María Valenzuela
- Luisa Vehil
- Eva Franco
- Eduardo Galán
- Gerardo Romano
- Erika Wallner
- Luis Medina Castro
- Héctor Pellegrini
- Pedro Quartucci
- Romualdo Quiroga
