= Carlos Olguin-Trelawny =

Argentine artist, director and screenwriter

- Born: 1944 (age 81–82); Buenos Aires, Argentina
- Occupations: Film director, screenwriter, visual artist
- Known for: A Dos Aguas

Carlos Olguin-Trelawny is a plastic artist, film director and screenwriter.

He was born in Buenos Aires, Argentina, in 1944. He began courses on filmmaking at the Pro Deo University in Rome. He also studied with masters such as Jean-Luc Godard in Paris. His first professional work was as second-assistant director to Academy Winner Russian director Sergei Bondarchuk for the 1970 film Waterloo. When he moved to New York City, he studied screenwriting with Paul Schrader and acting with William Hickey at the Herbert Berghof Studio.

In 1974 he took two sabbatical years and journeyed to the Orient. He chronicled his life-changing experience in a book called Mundos sin campanarios ("Worlds without bell towers").

He returned to Argentina where he wrote scripts for television and worked as an assistant director in films. His opera prima, the 1988 film A Dos Aguas, won a Special Mention at the prestigious 40th Locarno International Film Festival.

In 1991, Olguin-Trelawny moved to Los Angeles. There, he studied screenwriting at UCLA, directed shorts and documentaries, wrote for Telemundo/NBC and several screenplays and experimented with digital art.

In April 2007 he moved back to his home town Buenos Aires to write two screenplays: La carta ("The letter") and Mujeres de mi familia ("Women of my family").

In 2011 Olguin-Trelawny was Executive Producer of Vidas de película, a TV series produced by the Director's Guild of Argentina (DAC) about in-depth interviews to living film directors from Argentina's golden "60s Generation" like Manuel Antín, José Martínez Suárez, Pino Solanas, Simón Feldman, Octavio Getino, Leonardo Fabio, and Héctor Olivera.

He was a member of the Executive Board (period 2013–2017) of DAC where he was in charge of the Institutional Relations.

In 2014 he decided to become an artist full-time. He studied at Taller Guillermo Roux. He was part of the "Identidad" course given by Alejandra Roux for four years. He also studies with Marina Cursi in her watercolour workshop.

He was part of Guillermo Roux Foundation's Annual Show 2014, 2015 and 2016.

In 2018 he had his first individual show, "El tiempo del árbol" (The Time of the Tree) at Arenales Gallery in Buenos Aires.

He is presently studying with Uruguayan artist Anna Rank.

He exposes and sells his works at SAATCHI ART Gallery of Santa Monica, California.
