= Casas de fuego =

1995 film directed by Juan Bautista Stagnaro

- Directed by: Juan Bautista Stagnaro
- Release date: 1995
- Running time: 115 minutes
- Country: Aregntina

Casas de fuego is a 1995 Argentine biographical-drama historical film directed by Juan Bautista Stagnaro and starring Miguel Ángel Solá, Pastora Vega y Carola Reyna. It was released on August 31, 1995, and won seven awards, among them the "Kikito de Oro" for Best Film at the Gramado Film Festival and the Silver Condor Award for Best Film.

The film follows the life of Salvador Mazza, the Argentine physician who began investigating the Chagas disease in 1926 and over the years became the principal researcher in the country. Mazza produced the first scientific confirmation of the existence of Trypanosoma cruzi in Argentina in 1927, eventually leading to support from local and European medical schools and Argentine government policy makers. In Argentina and other countries the disease is known as mal de Chagas-Mazza (Chagas-Mazza disease).
