= Big Sir =

Big Sir may refer to:

- Big Sir (character), a fictional DC Comics character
- Big Sir (band), American band
  - Big Sir (album), a 2001 album by Big Sir
- Misspelling of Big Sur, a region of the central California coast

== See also ==
- Big Sur (disambiguation)
