= Crucero de placer =

- Directed by: Carlos Borcosque Jr.
- Written by: Daniel Delbene
- Starring: Katja Alemann Juan Carlos Altavista; Roberto Carnaghi; Noemí Ceratto; Patricio Contreras; Ana María Cores; Juan Carlos de Seta; Claudio García Satur; Juan Carlos Puppo; Pedro Quartucci Sandra Sandrini
- Cinematography: Luis Vecchione
- Edited by: Atilio Rinaldi
- Music by: Francis Smith
- Release date: 1980
- Running time: 85 minute
- Country: Argentina
- Language: Spanish

Crucero de placer is an Argentine film shot in Eastmancolor, directed by Carlos Borcosque Jr. based on the screenplay by Daniel Delbene. It was released on March 20, 1980, and stars Claudio García Satur, Juan Carlos Altavista, Ana María Cores, and Pedro Quartucci. It was partially filmed in the Paraná River Delta.

== Synopsis ==
The short journey two married men take to relax.

== Cast ==
- Claudio García Satur
- Juan Carlos Altavista
- Ana María Cores
- Pedro Quartucci
- Sandra Sandrini
- Juan Carlos de Seta
- Juan Carlos Puppo
- Roberto Carnaghi
- Patricio Contreras
- Mónica Elías
- Noemí Ceratto
- Katja Alemann
- Juan Manuel Tenuta

== Reception ==
Fernando Masllorens wrote in Convicción: "A film to forget long before watching it."

La Opinión wrote: "(Borcosque) now approaches comedy with humor, without vulgarity or vulgar situations, bringing the missing hotel to Argentine cinema: a floating one."

Manrupe and Portela write: "Inconsequential comedy with successful escapist intentions, achieved only partially."
