= The Last Suit =

- Spanish: El último traje
- Directed by: Pablo Solarz
- Screenplay by: Pablo Solarz
- Produced by: Mariela Besuievsky; Julia Di Veroli; Juan Pablo Galli; Gerardo Herrero; Dariusz Jabłoński; Vanessa Ragone; Antonio Saura; Juan Vera
- Starring: Miguel Ángel Solá; Ángela Molina; Olga Bołądź; Julia Beerhold; Martín Piroyansky
- Cinematography: Juan Carlos Gomez
- Music by: Federico Jusid
- Production companies: Zampa Audiovisual; Tornasol Films; Hernández y Fernández PC; Rescate Producciones AIE; Apple Films Polska; Haddock Films; Patagonik Film Group
- Distributed by: Outsider Pictures
- Release date: 6 October 2017 (Spain)
- Running time: 91 minutes
- Countries: Argentina; Spain; Poland
- Languages: Spanish, Polish
- Box office: $608,209 USD

The Last Suit (Spanish: El último traje; Polish: Ostatni garnitur) is a 2017 Argentine-Spanish-Polish dramatic film written and directed by Pablo Solarz, starring Miguel Ángel Solá, Ángela Molina and Martín Piroyansky. The film tells a story that explores old age, generational differences, judaism and the wounds that remain open from World War II.

== Plot ==
Abraham Bursztein, an 88-year-old Jewish tailor, who even has great-grandchildren, found out his daughters' intention to sell his apartment and send him to a nursing home. Later he decides to travel from Buenos Aires to Łódź in Poland, where he sets out to find his old friend Piotrek, who saved him from certain death at the end of World War II, and then helped him escape to Argentina. Abraham intends to keep his promise of returning one day and to also give him the last suit he ever made, to which the film title alludes.

What follows is a series of entanglements with road-movie elements that in its heart hides important themes. Despite his constant grumpiness and mistreatments, Abraham will always find someone willing to help him. In Spain, Maria (Angela Molina) will assist him after losing his money in a robbery, and to reconnect with his estranged daughter. In Germany, Ingrid (Julia Beerhold) will support him in making peace with the country and its people.

The magic of the story will even make a Polish nurse named Gosia (Olga Bołądź) who he barely knows; accompany him on the last leg of his journey to Łódz.

== Cast ==
- Miguel Ángel Solá as Abraham
- Ángela Molina as María
- Olga Bołądź as Gosia
- Julia Beerhold as Ingrid
- Martín Piroyansky as Leo
- Jan Mayzel as Piotrek
- Maciej Grubich as Abraham (19-year-old)
- Michał Sikorski as Piotrek (19-year-old)
- Mora Starosta as Sheine (girl narrator)
- Leticia Gurfinkel as Dalia (Tarna's grand daughter)
- José Luciano González as taxi driver
- Norma Argentina as Paulina (Abraham's assistant)
- Cristóbal Pinto as migration officer
- Natalia Verbeke as Claudia (Abraham's preferred daughter)
- Noemí Frenkel as Shoshana (Abraham's daughter)

== Festivals & Awards ==
- Academy of Motion Picture Arts and Sciences of Argentina (2018)
  - Nominated: Best Actor (Miguel Ángel Solá)
  - Nominated: Best Costume Design (Montse Sancho)
- Argentinean Film Critics Association Awards (2019)
  - Nominated: Silver Condor for Best Actor (Miguel Ángel Solá)
- Atlanta Jewish Film Festival (2018)
  - Winner: Audience Award for Best Narrative Feature
- Havana Film Festival New York (2018)
  - Winner: Havana Star Prize for Best Actor (Miguel Ángel Solá)
- Miami Film Festival (2018)
  - Winner: Audience Award for Best Feature Film
- Philadelphia Jewish Film Festival (2018)
  - Winner: Audience Award for Best Narrative Feature
- Seattle International Film Festival (2018)
  - Winner: Golden Space Needle Award for Best Actor (Miguel Ángel Solá)

== See also ==
- List of Argentine films of 2018
- List of Spanish films of 2017
