= Big Sur (disambiguation) =

Big Sur is a region of the Central California coast.

Big Sur may also refer to:

- macOS Big Sur, a version of the macOS operating system, released in 2020
- Big Sur Village, an unincorporated community

== Media ==
- Big Sur (novel), by Jack Kerouac (1962)
- Big Sur (film), a 2013 film based on the novel by Kerouac
- Big Sur (album), a 2013 album by Bill Frisell
- "Big Sur" (Jack Johnson song), 2017
- "Big Sur" (The Thrills song), 2003
- "Big Sur", a song by Mason Jennings from his album Mason Jennings

== See also ==
- "California Saga: Big Sur", a song by the Beach Boys
- Big Sir (disambiguation)
