= At the Edge of the Law =

Al filo de la ley
- Directed by: Juan Carlos Desanzo
- Written by: Juan Carlos Desanzo; José Pablo Feinmann
- Produced by: Juan Carlos Desanzo
- Starring: Rodolfo Ranni; Gerardo Romano
- Cinematography: Yito Blanc
- Edited by: Norberto Rapado
- Music by: Emilio Kauderer
- Distributed by: Argentina Video Home
- Release date: 7 May 1992
- Running time: 90 minutes
- Country: Argentina
- Language: Spanish

At the Edge of the Law (Spanish: Al filo de la ley) is a 1992 Argentine action thriller film directed and written by Juan Carlos Desanzo. The film starred Rodolfo Ranni and Gerardo Romano.

== Synopsis ==
A pair of swindlers robs a hotel in Miami. Both are persecuted by the one in charge of security, and they take revenge.

== Cast ==
- Rodolfo Ranni as Rodolfo Rivas
- Gerardo Romano as Raúl Fontana
- Katja Alemann as Mónica Ferraro
- Ulises Dumont as Gauna
- Jorge Sassi as Oficial Sánchez
- Vando Villamil as Beany
- Marcos Woinsky as Gerente
- Theodore McNabney
- Enrique Mazza
- Daniel Ripari

== Release ==
The film premiered on 7 May 1992.
