= Sur (song) =

Single by Aníbal Troilo and His Orchestra
- Language: Spanish
- English title: South
- Released: 1948
- Recorded: February 23, 1948
- Genre: Tango
- Length: 3:31
- Label: RCA Victor
- Composer: Aníbal Troilo
- Lyricist: Homero Manzi

Sur ("South") is an Argentine tango with music by Aníbal Troilo and lyrics by Homero Manzi. It was first recorded by Troilo's orchestra with vocals by Edmundo Rivero on 23 February 1948. The first live performance, by the same artists, was at the Tibidabo night club in Buenos Aires.

== Lyrics ==
The song is an elegy for a lost love, framed in the landmarks of the south side of Buenos Aires, lamenting both the end of a love story and the changes in the barrio (neighborhood). The male narrator addresses the girl in the second person; it is mentioned that the girl was 20 at the time. Among the landmarks mentioned are: the corner of San Juan and Boedo at the center of the Boedo neighborhood, Pompeya (the barrio located directly to the south of Boedo), the railway crossing and the swampland at the (southern) edge of Pompeya, and the enigmatic "blacksmith's corner, mud and pampa", which could refer to the corner of Centenera and Tabaré, already named in Manzi's earlier "Manoblanca" or to a blacksmith shop in the corner of Inclán and Loria, in Parque Patricios neighbourhood.

The chorus in its first four words is famously considered to capture the fabled pathos of existential angst of the Southern districts of Buenos Aires, with "Sur, paredón, y después..:" ("South, a [crumbling, old] wall, and beyond it.. ") the unfinished sentence evoking the desolate open spaces of the flat Pampas that seemed to crouch behind the (long gone at the time of writing) last dividing houses and vacant lots on the barrios' farthest empty cobblestone streets. This air of solitude and/or abandonment can be still partially felt at the southernmost reaches of Boedo and other formerly industrial and working class barrios del Sur such as the mentioned Parque Patricios, Pompeya, Barracas (named so for its former barracks) or La Boca, the last three bordering the Riachuelo, the demarcation line (never in plain sight, as always hidden beyond houses, factories, elevated tracks or paredones) that seemed to bring the city to an abrupt end, behind which lay nothingness. In the early 1800s the Riachuelo still marked the transition to the barbarous empty Pampas, at risk still of occasional aboriginal raids or malones, the geographical area associated with the endless preserve of the gaucho. Later since the late 1800s with its railways, factories and warehouses with the working classes, and since the second half ot the1900s with suburban industrial decay - always a seeming frontier-like remoteness long present in the collective imagination of the porteños (see for example Jorge Luis Borges' story "El Sur", or Fernando Solanas' film "Sur").

Rivero himself made two small changes to the lyrics, with Manzi's blessing: "florando" became "flotando" ("flowering" to "floating", as the original verb is uncommon and was not understood by audiences), and "y mi amor y tu ventana" became "y mi amor en tu ventana" ("and my love and your window" became "and my love in your window"). The first of these changes was universally adopted.

Manzi himself was actually born in Añatuya, Santiago del Estero, and moved into Buenos Aires at the age of nine, living close to the landmarks mentioned in the tango.

== Recognition ==
Troilo's collaboration with Manzi yielded several hits during the 1940s, including "Barrio de Tango" and the waltz "Romance de Barrio", but none achieved the universal recognition of "Sur", perhaps the tango most loved by Argentines, and certainly one of the most conspicuously recorded. Besides Rivero's original recording, notable versions include covers by Julio Sosa, Nelly Omar, Roberto Goyeneche, and Andrés Calamaro. Argentine author Ernesto Sabato has said that he'd give away all he's written for the privilege of being the author of "Sur".
