= Sul, Hormozgan =

Sul سول
- Village
- Location within Iran
- Coordinates: 25°47′36″N 57°39′49″E
- Country: Iran
- Province: Hormozgan
- County: Jask
- Bakhsh: Central
- Rural District: Jask

Population (2006)
  - Total: 166
- Time zone: UTC+3:30 (IRST)
  - Summer (DST): UTC+4:30 (IRDT)

Sul (Persian: سول, also Romanized as Sūl; also known as Sūl-e Gharbī) is a village in Jask Rural District, in the Central District of Jask County, Hormozgan Province, Iran. At the 2006 census, its population consisted of 166 people in 26 families.
