= Clock Mosque, Ayvalık =

Mosque in Ayvalık, Balıkesir, Turkey

Coordinates: 39.3190°N 26.6941°E

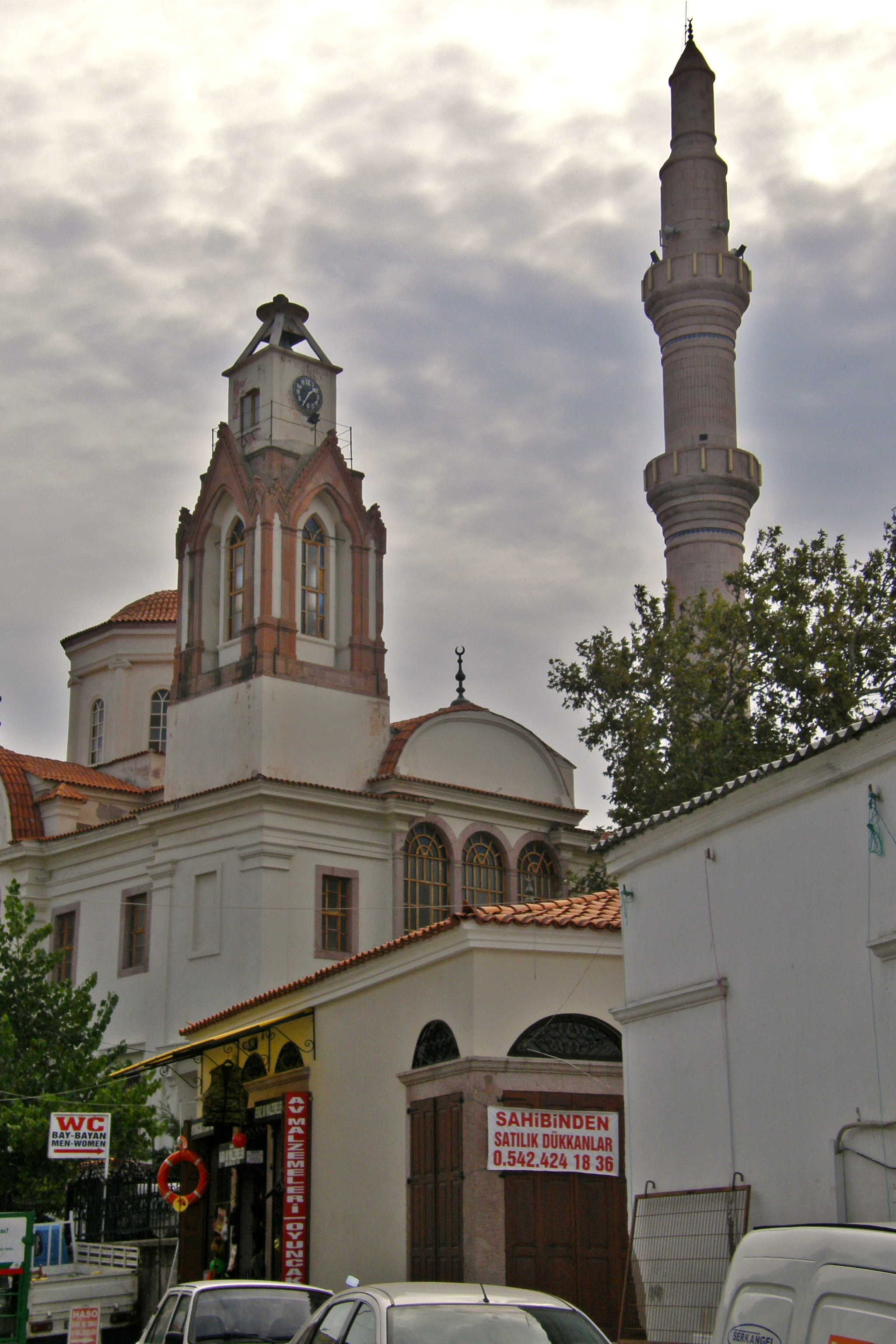
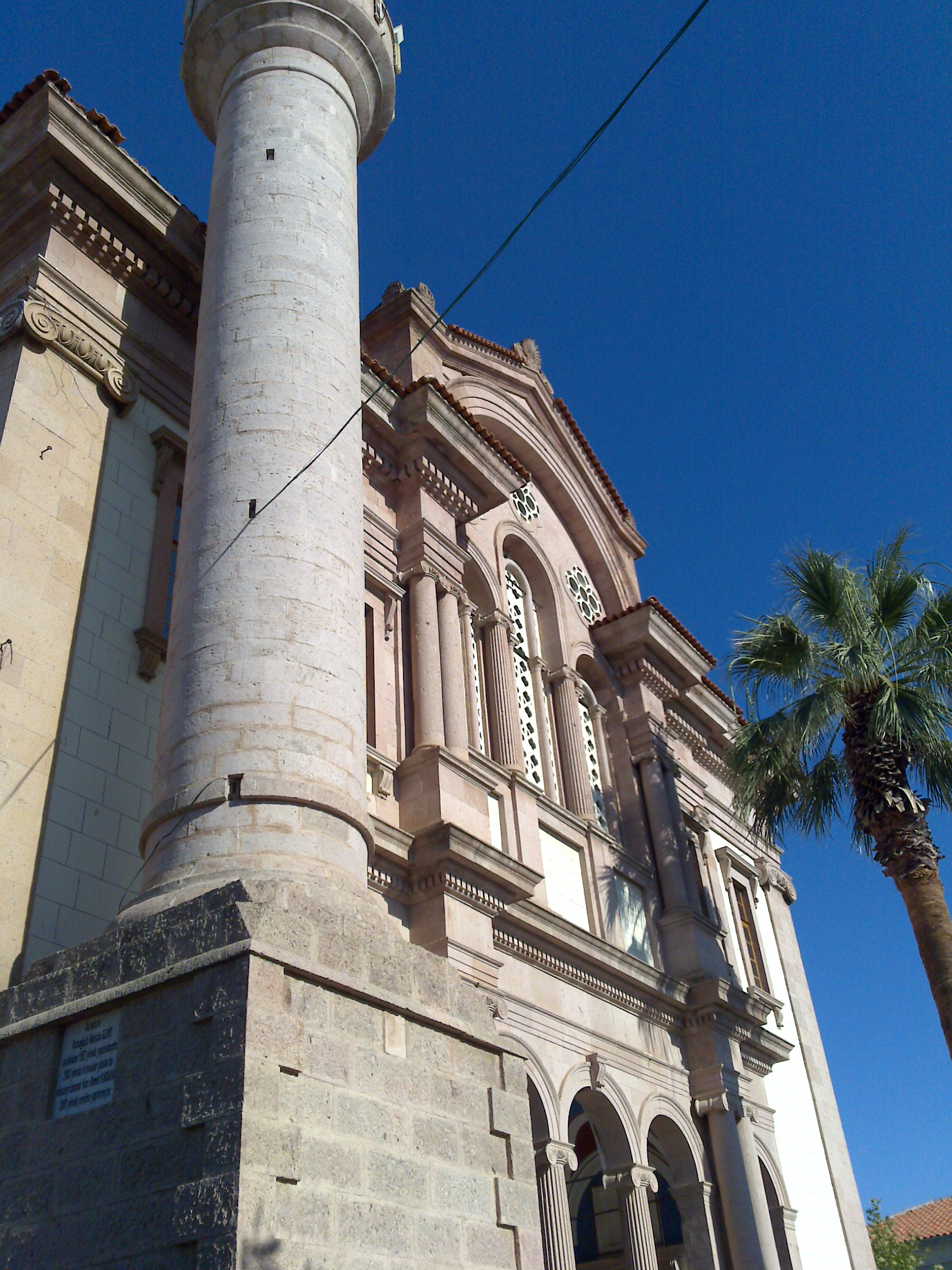
Outside views of the building

Agios Ioannis (Greek: Άγιος Ιωάννης, Turkish: Ayos İanni Kilisesi), meaning Saint John, is a former Greek Orthodox church built in 1850 in the coastal town of Ayvalık (known as Kydonies by the locals) — located in present-day western Turkey’s Balıkesir Province — which was formerly inhabited primarily by Greeks. Following the massacres of local Greeks during the Greek genocide between 1912 and 1923, and the subsequent expulsion of the survivors, the building was converted into a Sunni mosque in 1928.

After its conversion, the church — originally built on an Orthodox cross-shaped plan — was initially named the Bazaar Mosque (Çarşı Camii); the bell tower, originally constructed by the local Greeks, was retained. However, the historic icons were removed, and the artistic frescoes were painted over.

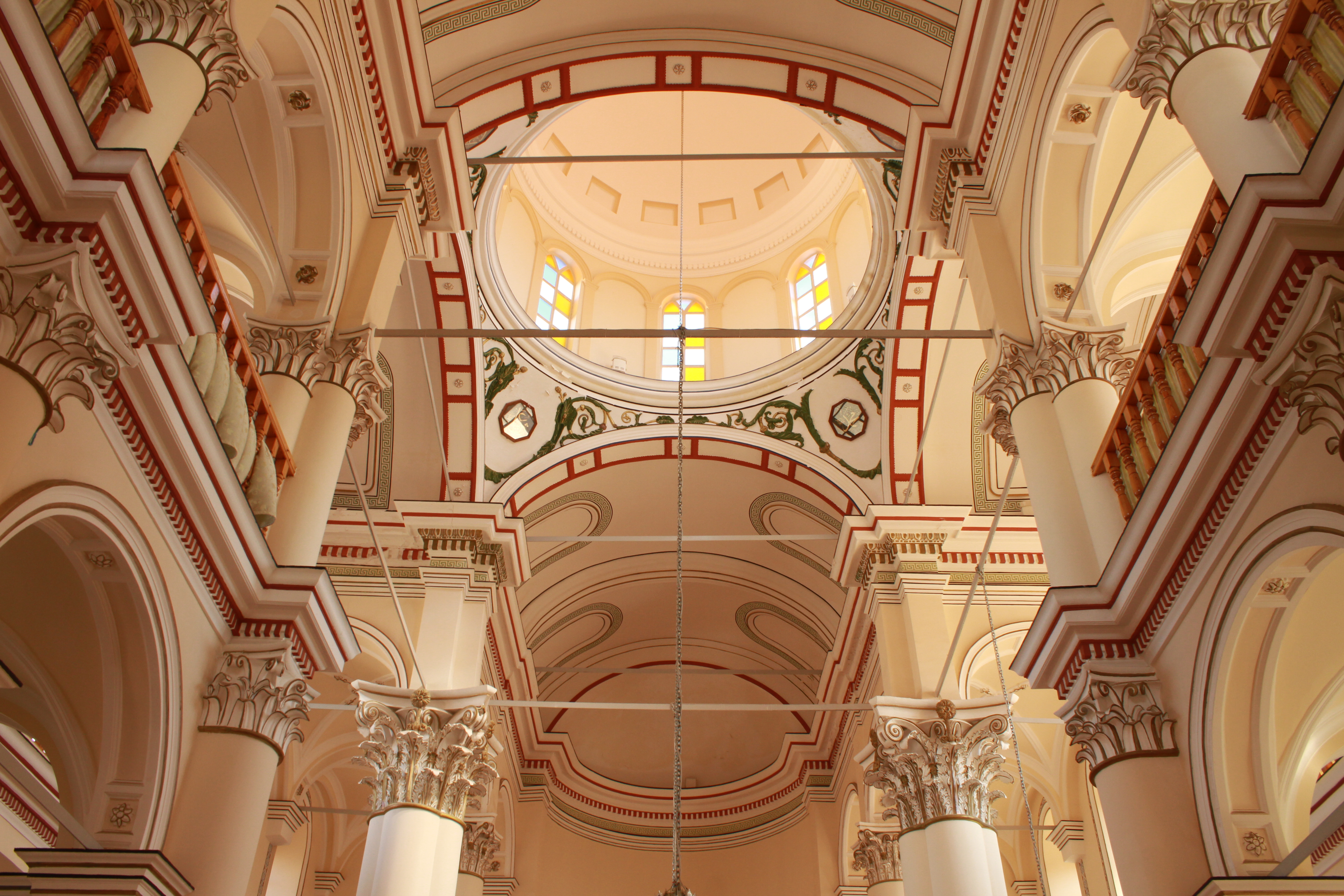
Cupola of the structure

Since the top of the bell tower was destroyed in a 1944 earthquake and subsequently converted into a clock tower, the mosque has been known as the Mosque with the Clock (Saatli Camii). In September 2003, a storm caused the minaret to collapse onto the church, damaging its historic brick-roofed dome.

Standing 24 meters tall and covering an area of 375 m², the church is the second-largest in the district of Ayvalık; the minaret built alongside it stands at 44 meters high.

== Sources ==
- "Milliyet Tatil - Tatil Haberleri, Tatil Yerleri ve Tatil Otelleri". Milliyet (in Turkish).
- "Ayvalık'ın en yüksek yapısı Saatli Camii | STAR". Star.com.tr (in Turkish). 2013-11-10.
