= Kuşadası Clock Tower =

Coordinates: 37°51′39″N 27°15′13″E

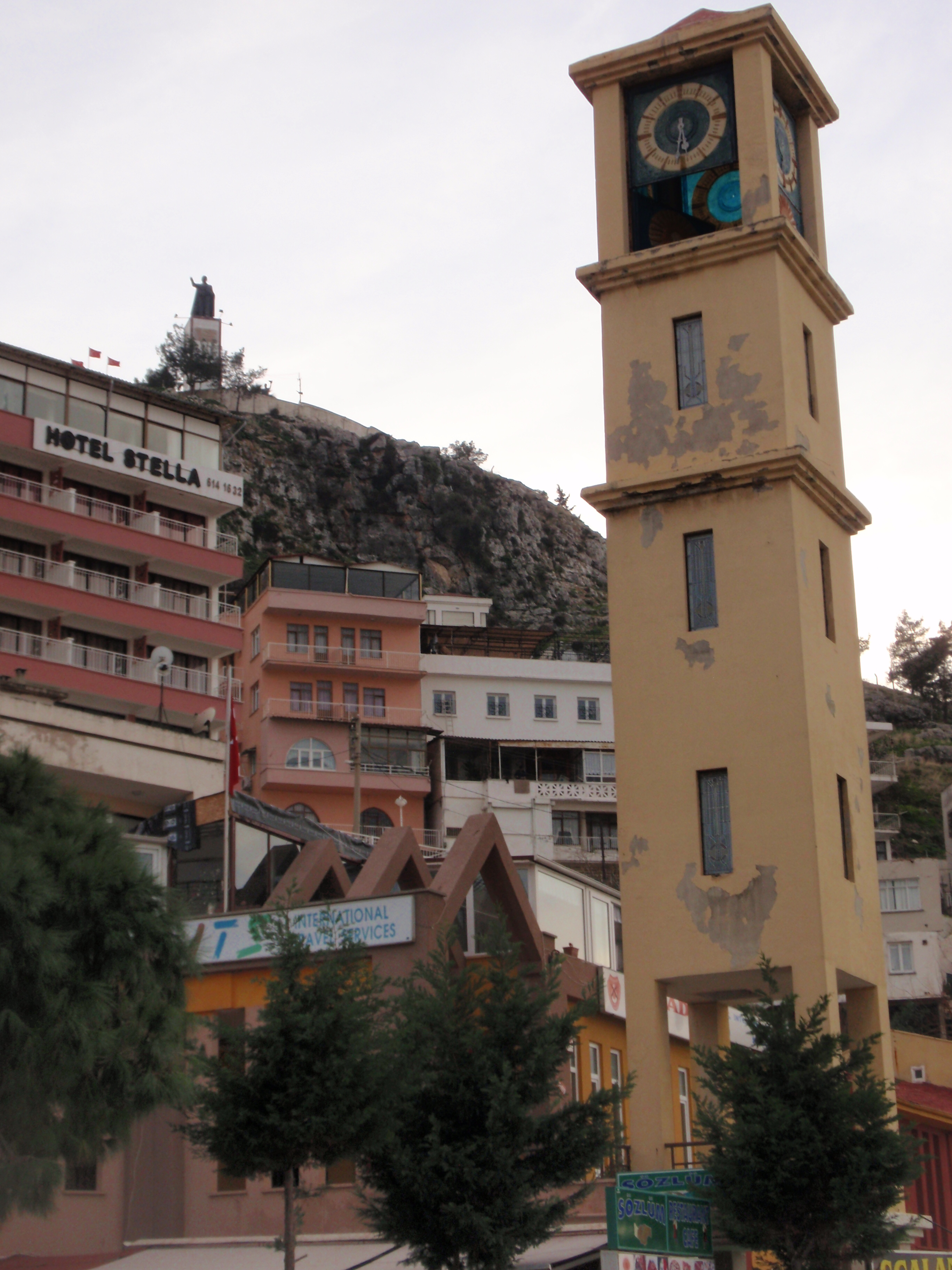
- Interactive map of the Kuşadası Clock Tower area

General information
- Type: Clock tower
- Location: Kuşadası, Aydın, Turkey
- Completed: 1996

Technical details
- Structural system: four-storey square plan

Kuşadası Clock Tower is a clock tower located in Kuşadası district of Aydın province, Turkey. The tower, built in 1996, was designed with a four-storey square plan and was completed with a circular clock dial and a pyramidal roof.
