= Surag, Qaen =

Surag سورگ
- Village
- Location within Iran
- Coordinates: 34°00′37″N 59°13′39″E
- Country: Iran
- Province: South Khorasan
- County: Qaen
- Bakhsh: Central
- Rural District: Mahyar

Population (2006)
  - Total: 92
- Time zone: UTC+3:30 (IRST)
  - Summer (DST): UTC+4:30 (IRDT)

Surag (Persian: سورگ, also Romanized as Sūrag; also known as Sūr) is a village in Mahyar Rural District, in the Central District of Qaen County, South Khorasan Province, Iran. At the 2006 census, its population was 92, in 23 families.
