= The South (short story) =

- Short story by Jorge Luis Borges
- Original title: El Sur
- Translator: Anthony Bonner
- Country: Argentina
- Language: Spanish

Publication
- Published in: Ficciones (2nd ed)
- Media type: Print
- Publication date: 1953
- Published in English: 1962

"The South" (original Spanish title: "El Sur") is a short story by Argentine author Jorge Luis Borges, first published in La Nación in 1953 and later in the second edition (1956) of Ficciones, part two (Artifices).

== Plot summary ==
"The South" denoument is set on the endless plains of the Argentine Pampas, traditional home of the Gauchos, which extend almost 1000 km South of Buenos Aires (also West and North) It was also associated with the wilder industrial and working class suburbs at the Southern edge of city, already increasingly decaying and abandoned at the time of writing

Juan Dahlmann is an obscure secretary in a Buenos Aires library. Although of German descent, he is proud of his criollo maternal ancestors: his military grandfather had died fighting the aboriginals in the wild Pampas "pierced by the Indians of Catriel", a romantic end that he enjoys thinking about. He has a number of family heirlooms: an old sword, a lithograph photo, and a small estate in "the South" - the vast Pampas plains south of Buenos Aires - he has never found time to visit.

In February 1939, he obtains a copy of Weil's Arabian Nights. He takes the book home, and—eager to examine it— he rushes up the stairs to his apartment while reading it, slashing his head accidentally with the sharp edge of a window frame left open. The wound on his scalp keeps Dahlmann bedridden at home with a very high fever. After a few (yet for him seemingly endless) days of perplexing and horrifying discomfort, he is moved to a clinic, where the treatment for his injury, instead of helping, causes him greater suffering. Rendered semi-delirious and confined in an anonymous room, he feels humiliation and self-hatred, as though he were in hell.

After days of painful treatment in the hospital, he is suddenly told that he is completely recovered, having survived sepsis. Discharged from the hospital, Juan Dahlmann sets off to his estate in the South to convalesce. Riding a taxi at dawn to the Southern railway terminal, Dahlmann regards the awakening city sights with great joy, enjoying them as if for the first time. Having to wait for his departure, he decides to have a bite at a famous cafe near the station where a cat lends itself to the patrons' caresses. Dahlmann reflects amusingly on the creature's seemingly inhabiting an eternal present dissociated from human time.

Dahlmann boards the train and rides out of the city into the plains of the South. He begins to read Arabian Nights but then closes the book because he is fascinated by the scenery. The train conductor enters his compartment and notifies him that the train will not be stopping at his destination so he will have to alight at a previous station. On the deserted station, Dahlmann steps off into nearly empty fields. He makes his way through the darkened roads to the only watering hole (a typical almacén de campo) outside of which he notices Gaucho's horses. He sits down, orders food, and begins to read Arabian Nights.

Three peones (farm hands) sitting at a table nearby throw a bread crumb at him, which he ignores, prompting them to recommence their bullying. Dahlmann stands up in order to exit the establishment. The shopkeeper (calling him by name) tells Dahlmann to pay them no heed, saying they are drunk. This prompts Dahlmann to do the opposite; he turns and faces the three locals. One of the thugs or compadritos brandishes a knife. The alarmed shopkeeper reminds Dahlmann that he does not even have a weapon. At this point, an old man in the corner, a gaucho (a figure who, to Dahlmann as to most Argentines represents the essence of the South and the country's romanticized past) throws a dagger at Dahlmann's feet. As he picks up the blade, Dahlmann realizes that this means he will have to fight, and that he is doomed; he has never wielded a knife in his life and is sure to die in the encounter. However, he feels that his death in a knife fight is honorable, that it is the one he would have chosen when he was sick in the hospital, and he decides to have a go.

The narrative switches from past to present tense in the story's final sentence, as Dahlmann and the thugs exit the bar and walk into the endless plain for their confrontation.

=== Alternative interpretation ===
In the Prologue to '’Artifices", Borges acknowledges an alternative interpretation of the narrative, while refraining from giving any details or hints about its nature. He writes:

"Of 'The South', which is perhaps my best story, let it suffice for me to suggest that it can be read as a direct narrative of novelistic events, and also in another way."

One may reinterpret the story so that everything after Dahlmann's darkest moments in the hospital is a narration of his idealized death, the one that Juan Dahlmann fabricates and enacts in his feverish mind while on the verge of a pathetic demise in the hospital that he has never really left. He imagines the journey South in order to regain a measure of honor, self-respect, and transcendence in his last moments of consciousness.

"The South" long held in the collective imagination of the inhabitants of Buenos Aires the mysterious and romantic associations it has in the mind of the story's protagonist, connected with the vast emptiness that seemed to often extend limitless beyond the last city retaining walls, where even in the early 1800s the memory lingered of the "malon" (Indian raids), and which was the fabled land of the Gaucho. Later "the South" was also home to the urban industrial and working class districts of Buenos Aires with their factories and warehouses where tango was born, in such traditional neighbourghoods as La Boca, San Telmo, Boedo, Pompeya, etc., also sometimes appearing in Borges imagery. Already decaying and crumbling during the "golden age" of tango lyrics in the 1930s and 40s (because the urban upward mobile development had started to shift to the North) they supply much of tango lyrics' physical imagery (as repeatedly portrayed for example in backdrops for tango shows) with their cobblestone streets and facón-welding "compadritos" (toughs), urban landscape of "The South" evoqued specifically in such famous tango lyrics as "Sur", or Fernando Solanas film Sur. Both urban compadritos and rural gauchos famously engaged in duels such as the one involved in the story's denouement.

== Notes ==
- The first paragraph in "The South" mentions Martín Fierro, a character from "The End", another one of Borges' short stories in the same collection. It also may refer to José Hernández's poem "Martín Fierro", which Borges was an admirer of.
- "The South" inspired and is referenced in the short story "The Insufferable Gaucho" by Roberto Bolaño.
- The short story is read by Mick Jagger's character in the 1970 film Performance. The movie contains several other allusions to Borges.
- Julio Cortázar's short story La noche boca arriba is a retelling of Borges's short story "The South."

== Adaptations ==
In 1990, Carlos Saura wrote and directed a 55-minute television movie based on El Sur entitled Los Cuentos De Borges: El Sur (English: The Borges Tales: The South). Saura's film takes place in more modern times (1990), and Saura also attempts to strengthen autobiographical themes found in the original story.
