= Suri, Hamadan =

Souri سوري
- Village
- Location within Iran
- Coordinates: 34°38′34″N 48°12′26″E
- Country: Iran
- Province: Hamadan
- County: Tuyserkan
- Bakhsh: Central
- Rural District: Khorram Rud

Population (2006)
  - Total: 207
- Time zone: UTC+3:30 (IRST)
  - Summer (DST): UTC+4:30 (IRDT)

Suri (Persian: سوري, also Romanized as Sūrī; also known as Sūr) is a village in Khorram Rud Rural District, in the Central District of Tuyserkan County, Hamadan Province, Iran. At the 2006 census, its population was 207, in 54 families.
