= Miguel Ángel Solá =

Argentine actor

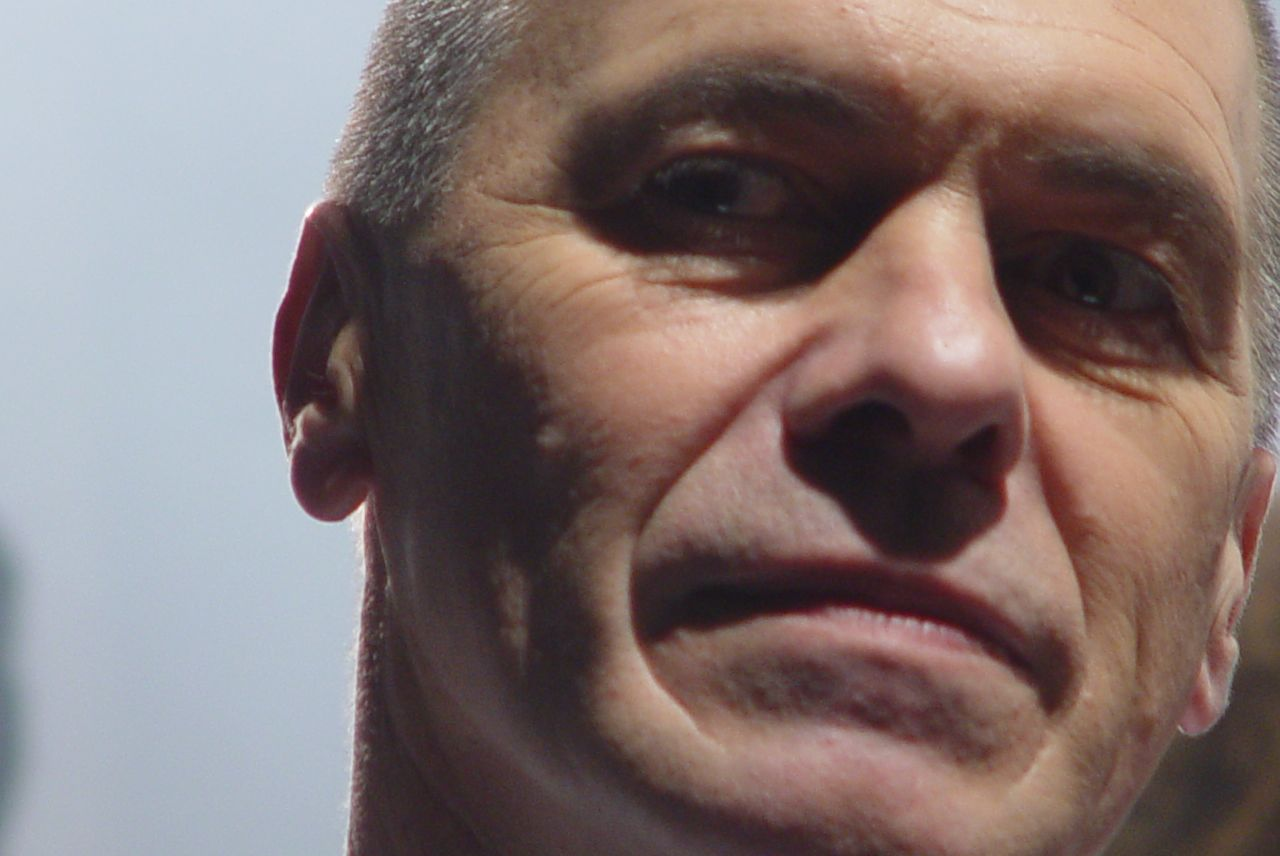
- Solá in 2009
- Born: May 14, 1950 (age 76), Buenos Aires, Argentina
- Occupation: Actor
- Spouses: Susú Pecoraro (divorced) Blanca Oteyza (m. 1995; div. 2011) Paula Cancio (m. 2012)
- Children: 3

Miguel Ángel Solá Vehil (born May 14, 1950) is an Argentine actor who has made over 60 film appearances in film and TV in Argentina since 1973. He is traditionally typecast in villain roles.

== Biography ==
Born in Buenos Aires, Solá belongs to the Vehil's dynasty of actors, eight generations of actors originally from Catalonia. His mother was Paquita Vehil and his aunt the legendary Luisa Vehil. His sister Mónica is also an actress. He began working in television in 1973 and made his big screen debut with Más allá del sol in 1975.

His theater beginnings were in 1971, and in 1976 he achieved stardom in Peter Shaffer's Equus with Duilio Marzio. He is well remembered in, among other plays, The Elephant Man, Deathtrap, and Jean Cocteau's The Two-Headed Eagle.

By the 1980s, he had become a major film actor appearing in major films such as Asesinato en el senado de la nación (1984), Sur (1987), and A dos aguas (1988). He portrayed the 1920s-era doctor and epidemiologist, Salvador Mazza, in the 1995 biopic Casas de fuego. He later starred in La Fuga (2001), The Impatient Alchemist (2000), La puta y la ballena (2004), and Arizona Sur (2004).

Solá married Spanish actress Blanca Oteyza in 1996, and the couple had two daughters. He moved to Spain, where he has a notable career in theater, movies and television. He was nearly crippled in November 2006 while bathing on a beach in the Canary Islands, and spent two months recovering from the accident. Solá and Oteyza separated in 2011 and he returned to Argentina, where he reappeared on television and the theater - and where he met Paula Cancio, a Spanish actress with whom he had a son in 2013.

== Selected filmography ==
- La enfermedad del domingo (2017, Ramón Salazar)
- The Last Suit (2017, Pablo Solarz)
- Despido procedente (Dismissal) (2017, Lucas Figueroa)
- Eva no duerme (2016)
- Subte - Polska (2016, Alejandro Magnone)
- Pasaje de vida (2015, Diego Corsini)
- Asesinos inocentes (2015, Gonzalo Bendala)
- El corredor nocturno (2009, Gerardo Herrero)
- La vida en rojo (2007, Andrés Linares)
- Va de citas (2007, Rodrigo Sorogoyen)
- Háblame bajito (2005, Fernando Merinero)
- Arizona sur (2004)
- La puta y la ballena (2003)
- El alquimista impaciente (2002)
- Octavia (2002)
- Fausto 5.0 (2001)
- Sé quien eres (2001)
- La fuga (2001)
- El amor y el espanto (2000)
- Corazón iluminado (1998)
- Tango (1998)
- Bajo bandera (1997)
- Tape Nº 12 (1997)
- Casas de fuego (1995)
- Fotos del alma (1995)
- La nave de los locos (1995)
- Una sombra ya pronto serás (1994)
- Picado fino (1993)
- Blue Eyed (1989)
- Ojos azules (1989)
- Bajo otro sol (1988)
- A dos aguas (1987)
- Sur (1987)
- Malayunta (1986)
- Prontuario de un argentino (1985)
- El exilio de Gardel (1985)
- Tacos altos (1985)
- Asesinato en el Senado de la Nación (1984)
- The Children of the War (Los chicos de la guerra) (1984)
- No habrá más penas ni olvido (1983)
- Los enemigos (1983)
- La Casa de las siete tumbas (1982)
- Momentos (1981)
- Los miedos (1980)
- Y mañana serán hombres (1979)
- Los médicos (1978)
- Crecer de golpe (1976)
- El grito de Celina (1975)
- Más allá del sol (1975)
- Proceso a la infamia (1974)
- La Mary (1974)

== Awards ==
=== Nominations ===
- 2013 Martín Fierro Awards
  - Best actor of miniseries

=== Wins ===
- Argentinean Film Critics Association Awards
  - (1985) Silver Condor for Best Actor - Asesinato en el senado de la nación
  - (1996) Silver Condor for Best Actor - Casas de fuego
- Biarritz International Festival of Latin American Cinema
  - (1995) Best Actor - Una sombra ya pronto serás
- Cartagena Film Festival
  - (1986) Golden India Catalina for Best Actor - Malayunta
- International Festival of New Latin American Cinema of Havana, Cuba
  - (1984) Best Actor - Asesinato en el senado de la nación
  - (1997) Best Actor - Bajo bandera
- Havana Film Festival New York
  - (2018) Havana Star Prize for Best Actor - The Last Suit
- Málaga Spanish Film Festival
  - (2006) Silver Biznaga for Best Actor in a Short Film - Háblame bajito
- Martín Fierro Awards
  - (1990) Premio Martín Fierro for Best Actor - Atreverse
- Seattle International Film Festival
  - (2018) Golden Space Needle Award for Best Actor - The Last Suit
- Spanish Actors Union
  - (2008) Award of the Spanish Actors Union in Television: Lead Performance, Male - Desaparecida
