= Al filo de la ley (2015 film) =

- Theatrical release poster
- Directed by: Hugo Flores; Juan Carlos Flores
- Written by: Renato Rossini; Hugo Flores; Juan Carlos Flores
- Produced by: Oscar Rossini; Renato Rossini
- Starring: Julián Legaspi; Renato Rossini
- Cinematography: Miguel Rojas
- Edited by: Adamo Pedro Bronzoni
- Production company: OR Producciones
- Release date: July 9, 2015
- Running time: 105 minutes
- Country: Peru
- Language: Spanish

Al filo de la Ley (lit. 'On the edge of the law') is a 2015 Peruvian buddy cop action film directed by Hugo Flores and Juan Carlos Flores in their directorial debut. Starring Julián Legaspi and Renato Rossini (who co-wrote the script with the Flores brothers). It premiered on July 9, 2015 in Peruvian theaters.

== Synopsis ==
They betrayed the mafia, they changed their identities to change their lives, today after 20 years they return to the side of the police, as infiltrators in a narco-terrorist mafia.

== Cast ==
The actors participating in this film are:

- Julián Legaspi as Mauro
- Renato Rossini as "Gringo"
- Milett Figueroa
- Reynaldo Arenas
- Fernando Vasquez
- Rómulo Assereto
- Karen Dejo
- Fiorella Flores
- Xoana Gonzales
- Katy Jara as Evelyn Ortiz
- Rubén Martorell
- Carlos Montalvo
- Juan Manuel Ochoa
- Miriam Saavedra as Stripper

== Reception ==
The film was seen by 16,387 spectators on its first day in theaters, becoming the second most watched Peruvian film on its first day of release for a while. The film attracted 168,720 viewers throughout its run through Peruvian theaters, becoming the sixth highest-grossing domestic release of the year.

== Sequel ==
After the success of the first part, it is confirmed that a sequel called Al filo de la ley 2 would be made, which would be shot in Colombia and the United States. This time it will be directed by Renato Rossini as well as featuring performances by Leslie Stewart, Jamila Dahabreh, Gerardo Zamora, Miguel Vergara, Mauricio Diez Canseco and Lisandra Lizama.
