= Boedo =

Coordinates: 34°38′S 58°25′W

- Neighborhood of Buenos Aires
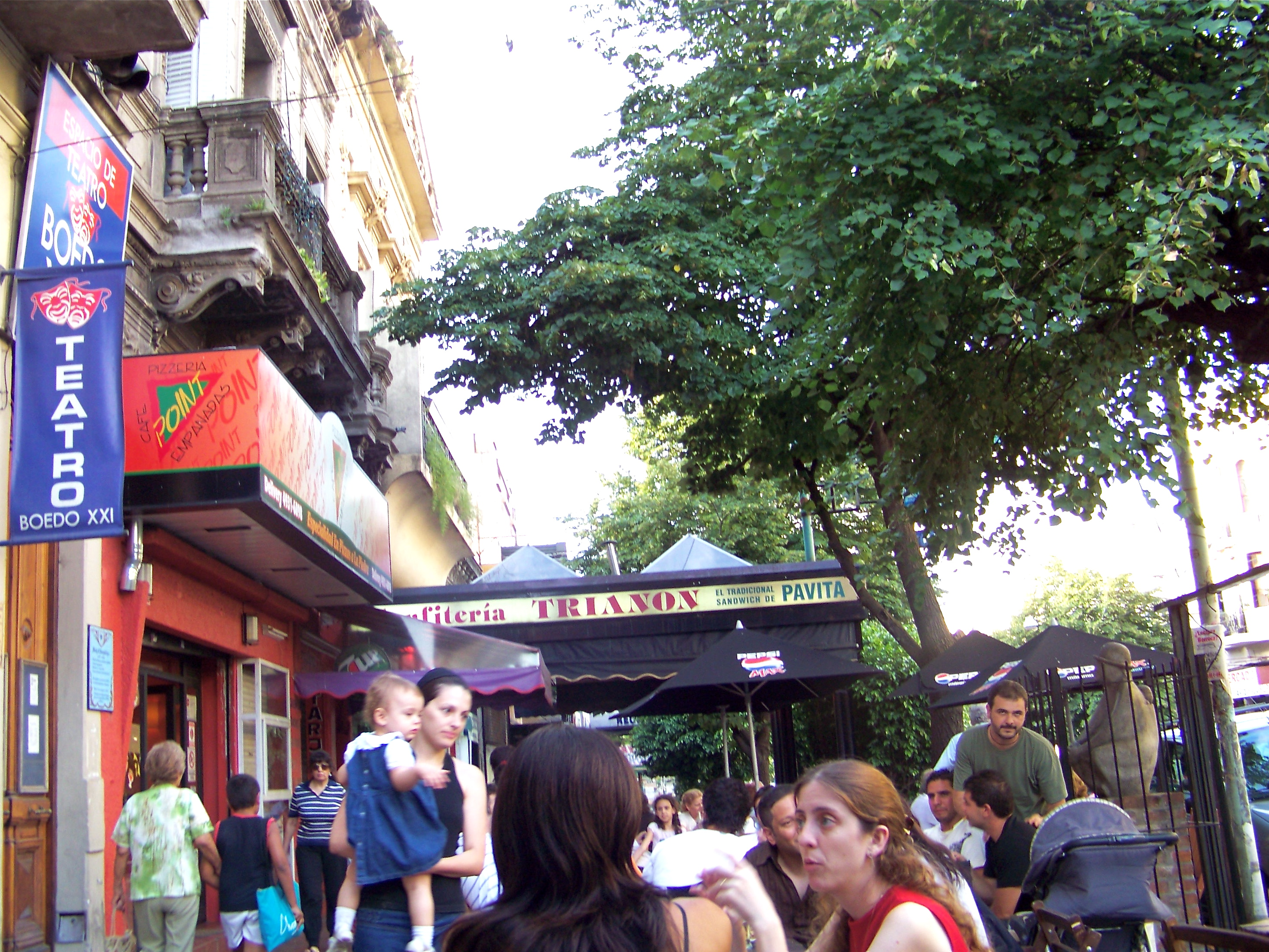
- Cafés on Boedo Avenue

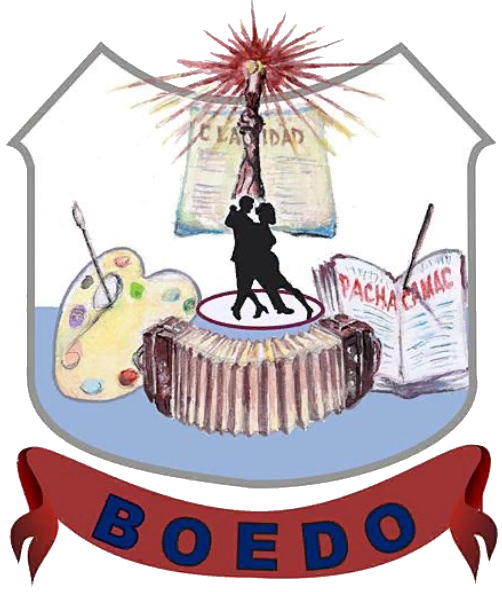
- Coat of arms

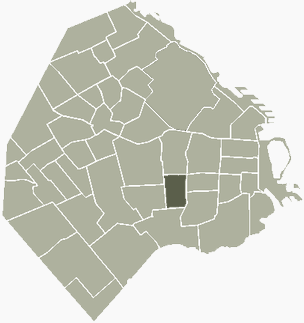
- Location of Boedo within Buenos Aires
- Country: Argentina
- Autonomous City: Buenos Aires
- Comuna: C5
- Important sites: Esquina Homero Manzi

Area
  - Total: 2.6 km^{2} (1.0 sq mi)

Population (1991)
  - Total: 48,231
  - Density: 19,000/km^{2} (48,000/sq mi)
- Time zone: UTC-3 (ART)

Boedo is a working-class barrio or neighborhood of Buenos Aires, Argentina. The neighborhood and one of its principal streets were named after Mariano Boedo, a leading figure in the Argentine independence.

It is the home of San Lorenzo de Almagro football club.

== Esquina Homero Manzi ==
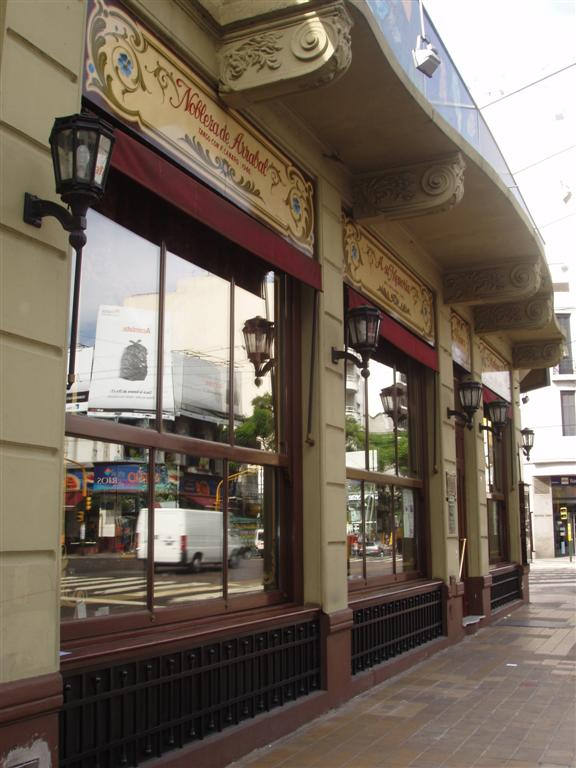
Esquina Homero Manzi

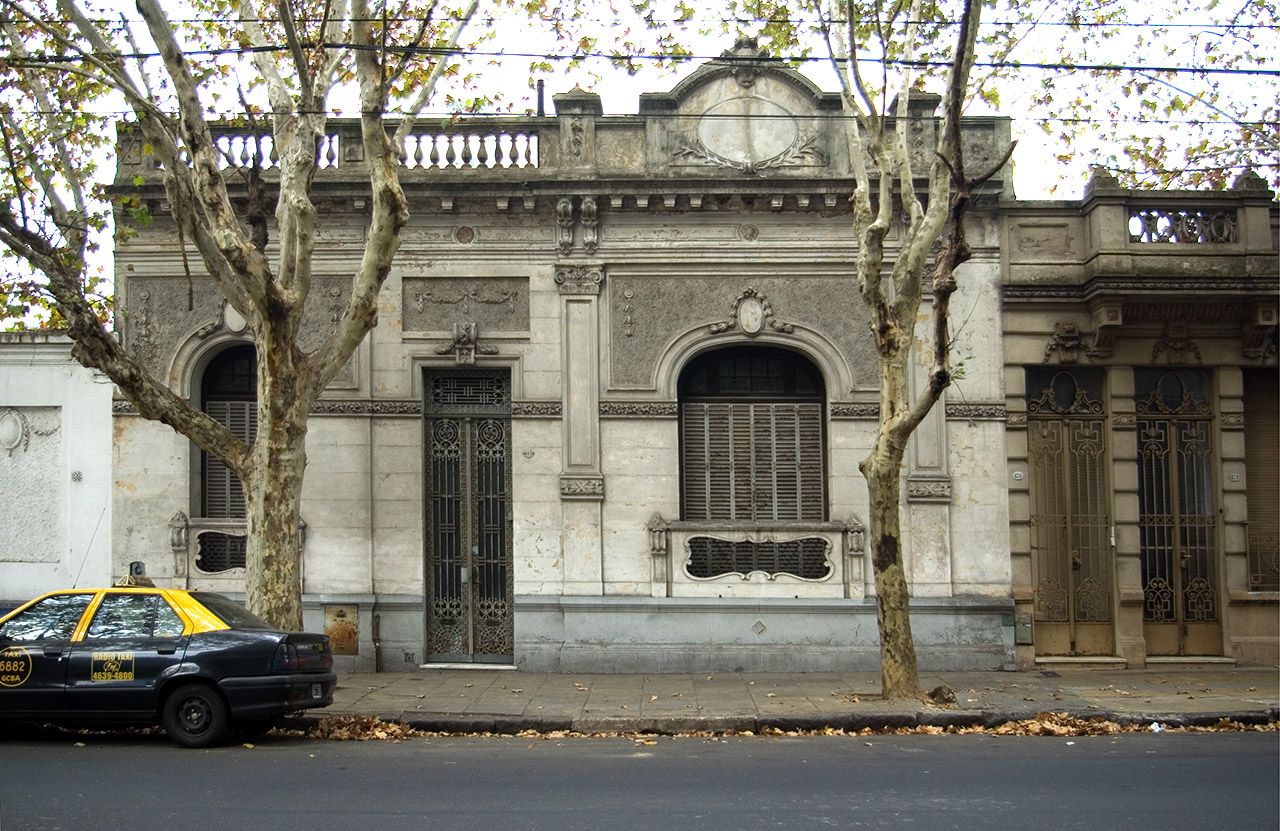
Traditional Boedo-area rowhouse, once ubiquitous in Buenos Aires

The corner of San Juan and Boedo is mentioned in the opening verse of the tango Sur, one of the best-loved songs about Buenos Aires. The corner is now known as Esquina Homero Manzi after the author of the lyrics, and is the venue for several tango festivals.

== Boedo Literary Group ==
The Boedo group were a group of left-leaning Argentine and Uruguayan writers in the 1920s. Notable members of the Boedo group included Enrique Amorim, Leónidas Barletta, Elías Castelnuovo, Roberto Mariani, Nicolás Olivari, Lorenzo Stanchina, César Tiempo, and Álvaro Yunque.

Magazines associated with the Boedo group included Dínamo, Extrema Izquierda and Los Pensadores, and Antonio Zamora's publishing house Claridad.

Olivari, who was a founder of the Boedo group, later became a member of the less political Florida group; Roberto Arlt was also associated with both groups.

== Transportation ==
Boedo has access to many bus lines to the center and to the nearby Primera Junta transportation hub. It has also access to the E Line of the subte (subway).

The main streets of the neighborhood are: Boedo to the South, San Juan/Directorio to the east, and Independencia/Alberdi to the West.

== Cultural references ==
The suburb is immortalized in the tango 'Boedo', written in 1928 by Julio De Caro and with lyrics by Francisco Bautista Rímoli. The lyrics personify it as a working-class suburb, a home of tango and a refuge for the poor who created it; the lyrics include a reference to the poets of the 'corner'.
