= Bajo otro sol =

- English: Under the Sun
- Directed by: Francisco D'Intino
- Written by: Francisco D'Intino; Guillermo López; Francisco Nieves; Juan F. Oliva
- Produced by: María Arrigoni; Ana Chacón; Susana Mori; Belie Muzzo; Mario Re; Gladys Suez
- Starring: Carlos Centeno; Laura Cikra Laura Cikra; Ulises Dumont; Jorge González; Miguel Angel Iriarte; Virginia Lago; Miguel Ángel Solá
- Cinematography: Eduardo Sahar
- Edited by: Enrique Muzio
- Music by: José Luis Castiñeira de Dios
- Release date: August 11, 1988 (Argentina)
- Running time: 92 minutes
- Country: Argentina
- Language: Spanish

Bajo otro sol (Spanish for Under Another Sun), is a 1988 Argentine film.

== Plot summary ==
Manuel Ojeda, a rural lawyer who previously worked as a teacher during the dictatorship, returns to his hometown in Córdoba, Argentina. Motivated by a desire for justice, he embarks on a mission to avenge a disappeared comrade. The missing person, a member of the Peronist Youth, was targeted by Alberto Barrantes, a former employee of the factory where he was employed. Determined to uncover the truth, Manuel sets out to locate the missing individual.

== Cast ==
- Carlos Centeno
- Laura Cikra
- Ulises Dumont
- Jorge González
- Miguel Angel Sola
