= Los Cuentos de Borges: El Sur =

El Sur
- Directed by: Carlos Saura
- Written by: Carlos Saura
- Produced by: Andrés Vicente Gómez
- Starring: Óscar Martínez; Nini Gambier; Gerardo Romano; Arturo Bonin; Jorge Marrale
- Cinematography: Jose Luis Alcaine
- Edited by: Pablo G. del Amo
- Music by: Ariel Ramírez; Hamlet Lima Quintana
- Distributed by: Iberoamericana Films/Quinto Centenario
- Release date: 1990
- Running time: 55 minutes
- Country: Argentina
- Language: Spanish

El Sur (English: The South) is a 1990 TV movie written and directed by Carlos Saura and is a chapter in the Spanish TV series Los Cuentos de Borges (English: The Borges Tales). Saura's 55-minute film is based on the short story El Sur by Argentine author Jorge Luis Borges.

== Plot ==
A shy Argentine librarian Juan Dahlman (Oscar Martinez) dreams that he is fatally stabbed on his family's ranch, located in southern Argentina. After suffering a head injury he is ordered to rest until full recovery. Dahlman decides to spend his time recovering at his family's ranch, fulfilling his long-held desire to revisiting the ranch. He sets off for the ranch and the destiny that awaits him there.

== Cast ==
- Óscar Martínez as Juan Dahlmann
- Nini Gambier as Doña Rosario
- Alexandra Davel as Sara Dahlmann
- Gerardo Romano as Carlos Manchon
- Juan Leyrado as Sergio
- Arturo Bonin as Casiano
- Villanueva Cosse as Don Alejandro
- Jorge Marrale as Pastor Guillermo Brige
