= Open from 18 to 24 =

- Screen-capture of film
- Directed by: Víctor Dínenzon
- Written by: Víctor Dínenzon
- Produced by: Claudia Cohen
- Starring: Gerardo Romano, Horacio Peña
- Cinematography: Hugo Colace
- Edited by: Juan Carlos Macías
- Music by: Emilio Kauderer
- Release date: June 2, 1988
- Running time: 88 minutes
- Country: Argentina
- Language: Spanish

Open from 18 to 24 (Spanish: Abierto de 18 a 24) is a 1988 Argentine drama film directed and written by Víctor Dínenzon.

The picture stars Gerardo Romano and Horacio Peña, and others.

== Plot ==
From six until midnight, Carla, who recently lost the love of her life, Vincente, leads a tango class. The students, mostly middle-aged and middle-class, attend for various reasons, but their shared enjoyment lies in the sensual romanticism of the tango's dance movements and music. However, when Vincente's attractive nephew arrives from the countryside, passions intensify, unearthing hidden jealousies and rivalries among the students. As the film reaches its conclusion, Carla, the instructor, unveils an unexpected truth about herself.

== Cast ==
- Gerardo Romano
- Horacio Peña
- Bernardo Baras
- Néstor Francisco
- Zulma Grey
- Chris La Valle
- Jorge Luz
- Jorge Abel Martín
- Silvia Peyrou
- Aldo Piccione
- Omar Pini
- Carmen Renard
- Nora Sajaroff
- Cora Sanchez
- Carlos Santamaría
- Eduardo Santoro
- Néstor Zacco

== Exhibition ==
The film was released on 2 June 1988.
