= Şule Gürbüz =

Turkish author, poet and clockmaker (born 1974)

- Born: 1974 (age 51–52)
- Occupations: Novelist, poet and clockmaker
- Writing career
- Period: 1992–present

Şule Gürbüz (born 1974) is a Turkish author, poet and clockmaker who has worked for the Directorate of National Palaces of Turkey since 1997. Her master in antique clockmaking is Recep Gürgen.

== Awards ==
- 2011 Writers Union of Turkey Public Publishing Award, for her book Saat Kitabı
- 2012 Oğuz Atay Story Award (Turkey), for her book Zamanın Farkında

== Bibliography ==
- Kambur, novel, Istanbul: İletişim Yayınları, 1992.
- Ağrıyınca Kar Yağıyor, poetry, Istanbul: Mitos Yayınları, 1993.
- Ne Yaştadır Ne Başta Akıl Yoktur, play, Istanbul: Mitos Boyut Yayınları, 1993.
- Zamanın Farkında, short stories, Istanbul: İletişim Yayınları, 2011.
- Saat Kitabı, essays, Ankara: TBMM Millî Saraylar Daire Başkanlığı Yayınları, 2011.
- Coşkuyla Ölmek,short stories, Istanbul: İletişim Yayınları, 2012.
- Öyle miymiş?, novel, Istanbul: İletişim Yayınları, 2016.
- Kıyamet Emeklisi, novel, Istanbul: İletişim Yayınları, 2022
