= The Two Waters =

1988 Argentine drama film

A dos aguas
- Film Poster
- Directed by: Carlos Olguin-Trelawny
- Written by: Martha Gavensky; Carlos Olguin
- Produced by: Carlos Olguin-Trelawny; Jorge Estrada Mora
- Starring: Miguel Ángel Solá; Bárbara Mújica
- Cinematography: Rodolfo Denevi
- Edited by: Armando Blanco
- Music by: Rodolfo Mederos
- Distributed by: Metropolis Films, Zurich, CH
- Release date: 28 April 1988
- Running time: 78 minutes
- Country: Argentina
- Language: Spanish

The Two Waters (Spanish: A dos aguas) is a 1988 Argentine drama film directed by Carlos Olguin-Trelawny, his opera prima, and written Martha Gavensky starring Miguel Ángel Solá and Bárbara Mújica.

== Plot ==
In Buenos Aires on Christmas Eve 1983, Rey (Miguel Ángel Solá) and Isabel (Bárbara Mujica), two old college friends, unexpectedly cross paths at a restaurant. It had been fifteen years since their last encounter. Isabel has just returned from exile, while Rey, grappling with personal struggles, had sought solitude. This serendipitous reunion with Isabel transports Rey back to their college days, where he harbored a secret love for her. The Entire Life explores the lasting impact of living under a brutal dictatorship and the desperate yearning of individuals to reclaim lost time. Moreover, it delves into the profound anguish of being an orphan, both in a physical and spiritual sense.

== Release ==
Praised by critics as the first post-modern Latin American film.
"A dos aguas" premiered on April 28, 1988 in Argentina and in various European countries most notably France in October 1988.

"A dos aguas" was produced by Avica Producciones and Jorge Estrada Mora Producciones (JEMPSA) and distributed worldwide by Metropolis Films (Zürich, CH).

== Reception ==
Director Carlos Olguin-Trelawny won a Special Mention at the 40th Locarno International Film Festival of 1987.

== Cast ==
- Miguel Ángel Solá as Rey
- Bárbara Mujica as Isabel
- Sandra Ballesteros as "La mujer felina"
- Rubén Ballester
- Jorge Baza de Candia
- Aldo Braga as "Patricio/Weintraub"
- Mónica Lacoste
- Cipe Lincovsky as "María"
- Miguel Ruiz Díaz
- Jorge Sassi as "Rey's Alter ego"
- Osvaldo Tesser as "Rey's father"
- Antonio Ugo as "Bartender"
