= Víctor Dínenzon =

Argentine film director and screen writer

Víctor Dínenzon (born 1952 in Buenos Aires) is an Argentine film director and screen writer.

He directed and wrote the script to the 1988 film, Abierto de 18 a 24.

== Filmography ==
DirectorAlgún lugar en ninguna parte(2008)Nieves(2004)Fugaz(2003)Mar de amores(1998)Las boludas(1993)Fútbol argentino(1990)Abierto de 18 a 24(1988) ProducciónNieves(2004) GuionistaAlgún lugar en ninguna parte(2008)Nieves(2004)Fugaz(2003)Mar de amores(1998)Las boludas(1993)Abierto de 18 a 24(1988) FotografíaNieves(2004) Assistante de DirecciónLa cruz invertida(1985)Asesinato en el Senado de la Nación(1984)
