= Goya Award for Best Ibero-American Film =

Annual award by the Spanish Film Academy

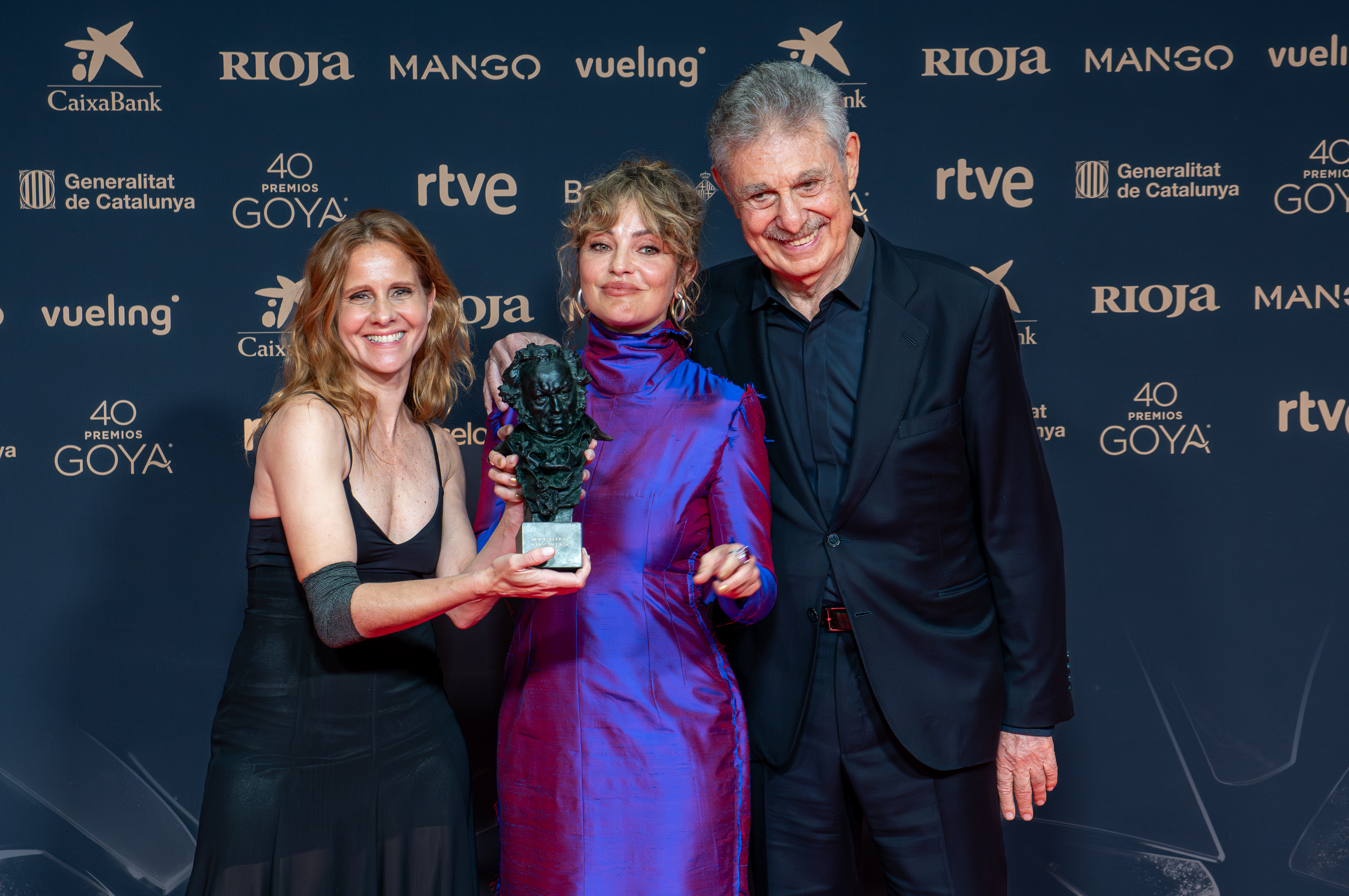
- Crew members of Belén holding their trophy
- Native name: Goya a la mejor película iberoamericana
- Awarded for: Best Ibero-American film of the year
- Country: Spain
- Presented by: Academy of Cinematographic Arts and Sciences of Spain (AACCE)
- First award: 1st Goya Awards (1986)
- Most recent winner: (Argentina) Belén (2025)
- Website: Official website

The Goya Award for Best Ibero-American Film (Spanish: Goya a la mejor película iberoamericana), formerly the Goya Award for Best Spanish Language Foreign Film (Spanish: Goya a la mejor película extranjera de habla hispana, 1987–2008) and the Goya Award for Best Hispanic American Film (Spanish: Goya a la mejor película hispanoamericana, 2009–2010), is one of the Goya Awards presented annually by the Academy of Cinematographic Arts and Sciences of Spain (AACCE) since the awards debuted in 1986. The category has been presented ever since then with the exception of the third edition where it was not awarded. Carlos Sorín's A King and His Movie was the first winner of this award representing Argentina.

The submission of a film to this category in representation of Portugal is not compatible with a submission of said film to the Best European Film award category. Regarding the films with both a Spanish share and a (non-Spanish) Ibero-American share of the production, leading producers are required to choose between opting for this category or the Best Film category.

== Winners and nominees ==
National origin of Goya Award winners and nominees for Best Spanish Language Foreign Film Won the award Nominated for the award Spain (ineligible for competition)

Argentina has received the most awards and nominations in this category with 20 wins and 32 nominations, Chile follows with 6 wins and 23 nominations. Goya winning films The Secret in Their Eyes (2009), A Fantastic Woman (2017) and Roma (2018) have won the Academy Award for Best Foreign Language Film representing Argentina, Chile and Mexico respectively, with the latter also being nominated for Best Picture and winning Best Director.

Argentine director Eduardo Mignogna is the most awarded director in this category, winning for Autumn Sun (1996), The Lighthouse (1998) and La fuga (2001), while the most nominated directors in this category are Peruvian director Francisco José Lombardi, nominated for Fallen from Heaven (1990), Without Compassion (1994), Captain Pantoja and the Special Services (2000) and Black Butterfly (2007) and Chilean directors Andrés Wood, nominated for Machuca (2004), The Good Life (2008), Violeta Went to Heaven (2011) and Spider (2019), and Maite Alberdi, nominated for La once (2015), The Mole Agent (2020), The Eternal Memory (2023) and In Her Place (2024), with four nominations each.

=== Notes ===
- The winner in each year is shown with a blue background and in **bold**.

=== 1980s ===
Year	English title	Original title	Director(s)	Country
1986 (1st)	**A King and His Movie**	**La película del rey**	**Carlos Sorín**	**Argentina**
1986 (1st)	Pequeña revancha		Olegario Barrera	Venezuela
1986 (1st)	A Time to Die	Tiempo de morir	Jorge Alí Triana	Colombia
1987 (2nd)	**Life Is Most Important**	**Lo que importa es vivir**	**Luis Alcoriza**	**Mexico**
1987 (2nd)	Man Facing Southeast	Hombre mirando al sudeste	Eliseo Subiela	Argentina
1987 (2nd)	A Successful Man	Un hombre de éxito	Humberto Solás	Cuba
1988 (3rd)	Not awarded			
1989 (4th)	**The Beauty of the Alhambra**	**La bella del Alhambra**	**Enrique Pineda Barnet**	**Cuba**
1989 (4th)	Aventurera		Pablo de Barra	Venezuela

=== 1990s ===
Year	English title	Original title	Director(s)	Country
1990 (5th)	**Fallen from Heaven**	**Caídos del cielo**	**Francisco José Lombardi**	**Peru**
1990 (5th)	Candy or Mint	Caluga o menta	Gonzalo Justiniano	Chile
1990 (5th)	María Antonia		Sergio Giral	Cuba
1991 (6th)	**The Frontier**	**La frontera**	**Ricardo Larraín**	**Chile**
1991 (6th)	Hello Hemingway		Fernando Pérez	Cuba
1991 (6th)	Jericó		Luis Alberto Lamata	Venezuela
1991 (6th)	Técnicas de duelo: una cuestión de honor		Sergio Cabrera	Colombia
1992 (7th)	**A Place in the World**	**Un lugar en el mundo**	**Adolfo Aristarain**	**Argentina**
1992 (7th)	Like Water for Chocolate	Como agua para chocolate	Alfonso Arau	Mexico
1992 (7th)	Disparen a matar		Carlos Azpurúa	Venezuela
1993 (8th)	**Gatica, el mono**		**Leonardo Favio**	**Argentina**
1993 (8th)	Knocks at My Door	Golpes a mi puerta	Alejandro Saderman	Venezuela
1993 (8th)	Johnny cien pesos		Gustavo Graef Marino	Chile
1994 (9th)	**Strawberry and Chocolate**	**Fresa y chocolate**	**Tomás Gutiérrez Alea and Juan Carlos Tabío**	**Cuba**
1994 (9th)	The Strategy of the Snail	La estrategia del caracol	Sergio Cabrera	Colombia
1994 (9th)	Without Compassion	Sin compasión	Francisco José Lombardi	Peru
1995 (10th)	**Midaq Alley**	**El callejón de los milagros**	**Jorge Fons**	**Mexico**
1995 (10th)	El elefante y la bicicleta		Juan Carlos Tabío	Cuba
1995 (10th)	Sicario		Joseph Novoa	Venezuela
1996 (11th)	**Autumn Sun**	**Sol de otoño**	**Eduardo Mignogna**	**Argentina**
1996 (11th)	Pon tu pensamiento en mí		Arturo Sotto	Cuba
1996 (11th)	Sin remitente		Carlos Carrera	Mexico
1997 (12th)	**Ashes of Paradise**	**Cenizas del Paraíso**	**Marcelo Piñeyro**	**Argentina**
1997 (12th)	Última llamada		Carlos García Agraz	Mexico
1997 (12th)	Vertical Love	Amor tropical	Arturo Sotto	Cuba
1998 (13th)	**The Lighthouse**	**El faro del sur**	**Eduardo Mignogna**	**Argentina**
1998 (13th)	Amaneció de golpe		Carlos Azpúrua	Venezuela
1998 (13th)	De noche vienes, Esmeralda		Jaime Humberto Hermosillo	Mexico
1998 (13th)	Kleines Tropikana		Daniel Díaz Torres	Cuba
1999 (14th)	**Life Is to Whistle**	**La vida es silbar**	**Fernando Pérez**	**Cuba**
1999 (14th)	Crane World	Mundo grúa	Pablo Trapero	Argentina
1999 (14th)	Juan, I Forgot I Don't Remember	Del olvido al no me acuerdo	Juan Carlos Rulfo	Mexico
1999 (14th)	Time Out	Golpe de estadio	Sergio Cabrera	Colombia

=== 2000s ===
Year	English title	Original title	Director(s)	Country
2000 (15th)	**Burnt Money**	**Plata quemada**	**Marcelo Piñeyro**	**Argentina**
2000 (15th)	Captain Pantoja and the Special Services	Pantaleón y las visitadoras	Francisco José Lombardi	Peru
2000 (15th)	Ratas, ratones, rateros		Sebastián Cordero	Ecuador
2000 (15th)	Lista de espera		Juan Carlos Tabío	Cuba
2001 (16th)	**La fuga**		**Eduardo Mignogna**	**Argentina**
2001 (16th)	A Cab for Three	Taxi para tres	Orlando Lubbert	Chile
2001 (16th)	Miel para Oshún		Humberto Solás	Cuba
2001 (16th)	Violet Perfume: No One Is Listening	Perfume de violetas	Maryse Sistach	Mexico
2002 (17th)	**The Last Train**	**El último tren**	**Diego Arsuaga**	**Uruguay**
2002 (17th)	The Crime of Father Amaro	El crimen del padre Amaro	Carlos Carrera	Mexico
2002 (17th)	A Lucky Day	Un día de suerte	Sandra Gugliotta	Argentina
2002 (17th)	Nothing More	Nada	Juan Carlos Cremata Malberti	Cuba
2003 (18th)	**Intimate Stories**	**Historias mínimas**	**Carlos Sorín**	**Argentina**
2003 (18th)	El misterio del Trinidad		José Luis García Agraz	Mexico
2003 (18th)	Suite Habana		Fernando Pérez	Cuba
2003 (18th)	Seawards Journey	El viaje hacia el mar	Guillermo Casanova	Uruguay
2004 (19th)	**Whisky**		**Juan Pablo Rebella and Pablo Stoll**	**Uruguay**
2004 (19th)	El rey		Antonio Dorado	Colombia
2004 (19th)	Machuca		Andrés Wood	Chile
2004 (19th)	Moon of Avellaneda	Luna de Avellaneda	Juan José Campanella	Argentina
2005 (20th)	**Blessed by Fire**	**Iluminados por el fuego**	**Tristán Bauer**	**Argentina**
2005 (20th)	Alma mater		Álvaro Buela	Uruguay
2005 (20th)	My Best Enemy	Mi mejor enemigo	Álex Bowen	Chile
2005 (20th)	Rosario Tijeras		Jorge Franco	Colombia
2006 (21st)	**The Hands**	**Las manos**	**Alejandro Doria**	**Argentina**
2006 (21st)	American Visa		Juan Carlos Valdivia	Bolivia
2006 (21st)	In Bed	En la cama	Matías Bize	Chile
2006 (21st)	A Ton of Luck	Soñar no cuesta nada	Rodrigo Triana	Colombia
2007 (22nd)	**XXY**		**Lucía Puenzo**	**Argentina**
2007 (22nd)	Black Butterfly	Mariposa negra	Francisco José Lombardi	Peru
2007 (22nd)	Padre nuestro		Rodrigo Sepúlveda	Chile
2007 (22nd)	The Silly Age	La edad de la peseta	Pavel Giroud	Cuba
2008 (23rd)	**The Good Life**	**La buena vida**	**Andrés Wood**	**Chile**
2008 (23rd)	Acne	Acné	Federico Veiroj	Uruguay
2008 (23rd)	Dog Eat Dog	Perro come perro	Carlos Moreno	Colombia
2008 (23rd)	Lake Tahoe		Fernando Eimbcke	Mexico
2009 (24th)	**The Secret in Their Eyes**	**El secreto de sus ojos**	**Juan José Campanella**	**Argentina**
2009 (24th)	Dawson Isla 10		Miguel Littín	Chile
2009 (24th)	Gigante		Adrián Biniez	Uruguay
2009 (24th)	The Milk of Sorrow	La teta asustada	Claudia Llosa	Peru

=== 2010s ===
Year	English title	Original title	Director(s)	Country
2010 (25th)	**The Life of Fish**	**La vida de los peces**	**Matías Bize**	**Chile**
2010 (25th)	El infierno		Luis Estrada	Mexico
2010 (25th)	The Man Next Door	El hombre de al lado	Mariano Cohn and Gastón Duprat	Argentina
2010 (25th)	Undertow	Contracorriente	Javier Fuentes-León	Peru
2011 (26th)	**Chinese Take-Away**	**Un cuento chino**	**Sebastián Borensztein**	**Argentina**
2011 (26th)	Ticket to Paradise	Boleto al paraíso	Gerardo Chijona	Cuba
2011 (26th)	Miss Bala		Gerardo Naranjo	Mexico
2011 (26th)	Violeta Went to Heaven	Violeta se fue a los cielos	Andrés Wood	Chile
2012 (27th)	**Juan of the Dead**	**Juan de los Muertos**	**Alejandro Brugués**	**Cuba**
2012 (27th)	7 Boxes	7 Cajas	Juan Carlos Maneglia and Tana Schémbori	Paraguay
2012 (27th)	After Lucia	Después de Lucía	Michel Franco	Mexico
2012 (27th)	Clandestine Childhood	Infancia clandestina	Benjamín Ávila	Argentina
2013 (28th)	**Blue and Not So Pink**	**Azul y no tan rosa**	**Miguel Ferrari**	**Venezuela**
2013 (28th)	The German Doctor	Wakolda	Lucía Puenzo	Argentina
2013 (28th)	Gloria		Sebastián Lelio	Chile
2013 (28th)	The Golden Dream	La jaula de oro	Diego Quemada-Díez	Mexico
2014 (29th)	**Wild Tales**	**Relatos salvajes**	**Damián Szifron**	**Argentina**
2014 (29th)	Mr. Kaplan		Álvaro Brechner	Uruguay
2014 (29th)	Behavior	Conducta	Ernesto Daranas	Cuba
2014 (29th)	La distancia más larga		Claudia Pinto	Venezuela
2015 (30th)	**The Clan**	**El clan**	**Pablo Trapero**	**Argentina**
2015 (30th)	La once		Maite Alberdi	Chile
2015 (30th)	Magallanes		Salvador del Solar	Peru
2015 (30th)	Vestido de novia		Marilyn Solaya	Cuba
2016 (31st)	**The Distinguished Citizen**	**El ciudadano ilustre**	**Gastón Duprat and Mariano Cohn**	**Argentina**
2016 (31st)	Anna		Jacques Toulemonde Vidal	Colombia
2016 (31st)	From Afar	Desde allá	Lorenzo Vigas	Venezuela
2016 (31st)	The Chosen Ones	Las elegidas	David Pablos	Mexico
2017 (32nd)	**A Fantastic Woman**	**Una mujer fantástica**	**Sebastián Lelio**	**Chile**
2017 (32nd)	Amazona		Clare Weiskopf	Colombia
2017 (32nd)	Tempestad		Tatiana Huezo	Mexico
2017 (32nd)	Zama		Lucrecia Martel	Argentina
2018 (33rd)	**Roma**		**Alfonso Cuarón**	**Mexico**
2018 (33rd)	El Angel	El ángel	Luis Ortega	Argentina
2018 (33rd)	A Twelve-Year Night	La noche de 12 años	Álvaro Brechner	Uruguay
2018 (33rd)	Mariana	Los perros	Marcela Said	Chile
2019 (34th)	**Heroic Losers**	**La odisea de los giles**	**Sebastián Borensztein**	**Argentina**
2019 (34th)	Spider	Araña	Andrés Wood	Chile
2019 (34th)	The Awakening of the Ants	El despertar de las hormigas	Antonella Sudasassi	Costa Rica
2019 (34th)	Monos		Alejandro Landes	Colombia

=== 2020s ===
Year	English title	Original title	Director(s)	Country
2020 (35th)	**Forgotten We'll Be**	**El olvido que seremos**	**Fernando Trueba**	**Colombia**
2020 (35th)	The Mole Agent	El agente topo	Maite Alberdi	Chile
2020 (35th)	La Llorona		Jayro Bustamante	Guatemala
2020 (35th)	I'm No Longer Here	Ya no estoy aquí	Fernando Frías de la Parra	Mexico
2021 (36th)	**The Cordillera of Dreams**	**La cordillera de los sueños**	**Patricio Guzmán**	**Chile**
2021 (36th)	Song Without a Name	Canción sin nombre	Melina León	Peru
2021 (36th)	The Siamese Bond	Las siamesas	Paula Hernández	Argentina
2021 (36th)	Los Lobos		Samuel Kishi	Mexico
2022 (37th)	**Argentina, 1985**		**Santiago Mitre**	**Argentina**
2022 (37th)	1976		Manuela Martelli	Chile
2022 (37th)	The Pack	La jauría	Andrés Ramírez Pulido	Colombia
2022 (37th)	Prayers for the Stolen	Noche de fuego	Tatiana Huezo	Mexico
2022 (37th)	Utama		Alejandro Loayza Grisi	Bolivia
2023 (38th)	**The Eternal Memory**	**La memoria infinita**	**Maite Alberdi**	**Chile**
2023 (38th)	Alma Viva		Cristèle Alves Meira	Portugal
2023 (38th)	The Fishbowl	La pecera	Glorimar Marrero Sánchez	Puerto Rico
2023 (38th)	Puan		Benjamín Naishtat and María Alché	Argentina
2023 (38th)	Simón		Diego Vicentini	Venezuela
2024 (39th)	**I'm Still Here**	**Ainda Estou Aqui**	**Walter Salles**	**Brazil**
2024 (39th)	Don't You Let Me Go	Agarrame fuerte	Ana Guevara and Leticia Jorge	Uruguay
2024 (39th)	Kill the Jockey	El Jockey	Luis Ortega	Argentina
2024 (39th)	In Her Place	El lugar de la otra	Maite Alberdi	Chile
2024 (39th)	Memories of a Burning Body	Memorias de un cuerpo que arde	Antonella Sudasassi Furniss	Costa Rica
2025 (40th)	**Belén**		**Dolores Fonzi**	**Argentina**
2025 (40th)	The Mysterious Gaze of the Flamingo	La misteriosa mirada del flamenco	Diego Céspedes	Chile
2025 (40th)	La piel del agua		Patricia Velásquez	Costa Rica
2025 (40th)	Manas		Marianna Brennand	Brazil
2025 (40th)	A Poet	Un poeta	Simón Mesa Soto	Colombia

== Awards by country ==
Country	Awards	Nominations
Argentina	20	32
Chile	6	23
Cuba	4	19
Mexico	3	21
Uruguay	2	9
Colombia	1	14
Venezuela	1	11
Peru	1	8
Brazil	1	2
Costa Rica	0	3
Bolivia	0	2
Ecuador	0	1
Guatemala	0	1
Paraguay	0	1
Portugal	0	1
Puerto Rico	0	1

== See also ==
- Ariel Award for Best Ibero-American Film
