= List of Argentine films of 1996 =

A list of films produced in Argentina in 1996:

Argentine films of 1996
Title	Director	Release	Genre
A - C
Adiós, abuelo	Emilio Vieyra	5 September	
Al corazón	Mario Sábato	6 June	
Amor de otoño	José Conrado Castelli	28 November	
Años rebeldes	Rosalía Polizzi	5 December	
Así o de otra manera	David José Kohon	13 June	
El ausente	Rafael Filipelli	23 August	
Besos en la frente	Carlos Galettini	5 September	
Carlos Monzón, el segundo juicio	Gabriel Arbós	11 January	
Cazadores de utopías	David Blaustein	21 March	
El cóndor de oro	Enrique Muzio	20 April	
D - G
La dama regresa	Jorge Polaco	12 September	
El dedo en la llaga	Alberto Lecchi	30 May	
De mi barrio con amor	José Santiso	20 June	
Despabílate amor	Eliseo Subiela	3 October	
El día que Maradona conoció a Gardel	Rodolfo Pagliere	17 October	
Eva Perón	Juan Carlos Desanzo	24 October	
Flores amarillas en la ventana	Víctor Jorge Ruiz	4 July	
La frontera olvidada	Juan Carlos Neyra	5 August	
La fuga	Adrián Szmukler		cortometraje
Geisha	Eduardo Raspo	13 June	
H - Q
Historias de amor, de locura y de muerte	Nemesio Juárez	28 March	
Hundan al Belgrano	Federico Urioste	25 April	
Juego limpio	Hebert Posse Amorim	9 May	
Lola Mora (film)1Lola Mora	Javier Torre	11 January	
La maestra normal	Carlos Orgambide	21 November	
Moebius	Gustavo R. Mosquera	17 October	
El mundo contra mí	Beda Docampo Feijóo	19 September	
Otra esperanza	Mercedes Frutos	22 February	
Policía corrupto	Carlo Campanile	13 June	
R - Z
Rapado	Martín Rejtman	1 August	
La revelación	Mario David	15 August	
Sol de otoño	Eduardo Mignogna	8 August	
S.O.S. Gulubú	Susana Tozzi	18 July	
Sotto voce	Mario Levin	28 November	
Tierra de Avellaneda	Daniele Incalcaterra	22 November	
Unicornio, el jardín de las frutas	Pablo César	12 December	
Veredicto final	Jorge Darnell	10 October	
El verso	Santiago Carlos Oves	15 February	

== External links and references ==
- Argentine films of 1996 at the Internet Movie Database
