= Güemes: la tierra en armas =

Güemes – la tierra en arma
- Directed by: Leopoldo Tore Nilsson
- Written by: Juan Carlos Dávalos
- Produced by: Leopoldo Torre Nilsson
- Starring: Alfredo Alcón
- Cinematography: Aníbal Di Salvo
- Edited by: Antonio Ripoll
- Release date: 7 April 1971
- Running time: 100 minutes
- Country: Argentina
- Language: Spanish

Güemes - la tierra en armas (English: "Güemes, The Armed Land") is a 1971 Argentine war drama film written and directed by Leopoldo Torre Nilsson and starring Norma Aleandro, Alfredo Alcón and Mercedes Sosa. It was entered into the 7th Moscow International Film Festival. It is based on the life of revolutionaries general Martín Miguel de Güemes and commander Juana Azurduy.

== Cast ==
- Alfredo Alcón as Güemes
- Norma Aleandro as Macacha Güemes
- Gabriela Gili as Carmen
- José Slavin as Gen. de la Serna
- Mercedes Sosa as Juana Azurduy
- Alfredo Duarte
- Alfredo Iglesias
- Luis María Mathé
- Rodolfo Brindisi
- José Oroño
- Tito Rinaldi
- José María Labernié
- Oscar Del Valle
- Teresa Montenegro
- Carlos Lise

== See also ==
- Martín Miguel de Güemes
