= Patricio Contreras =

Chilean-Argentine actor

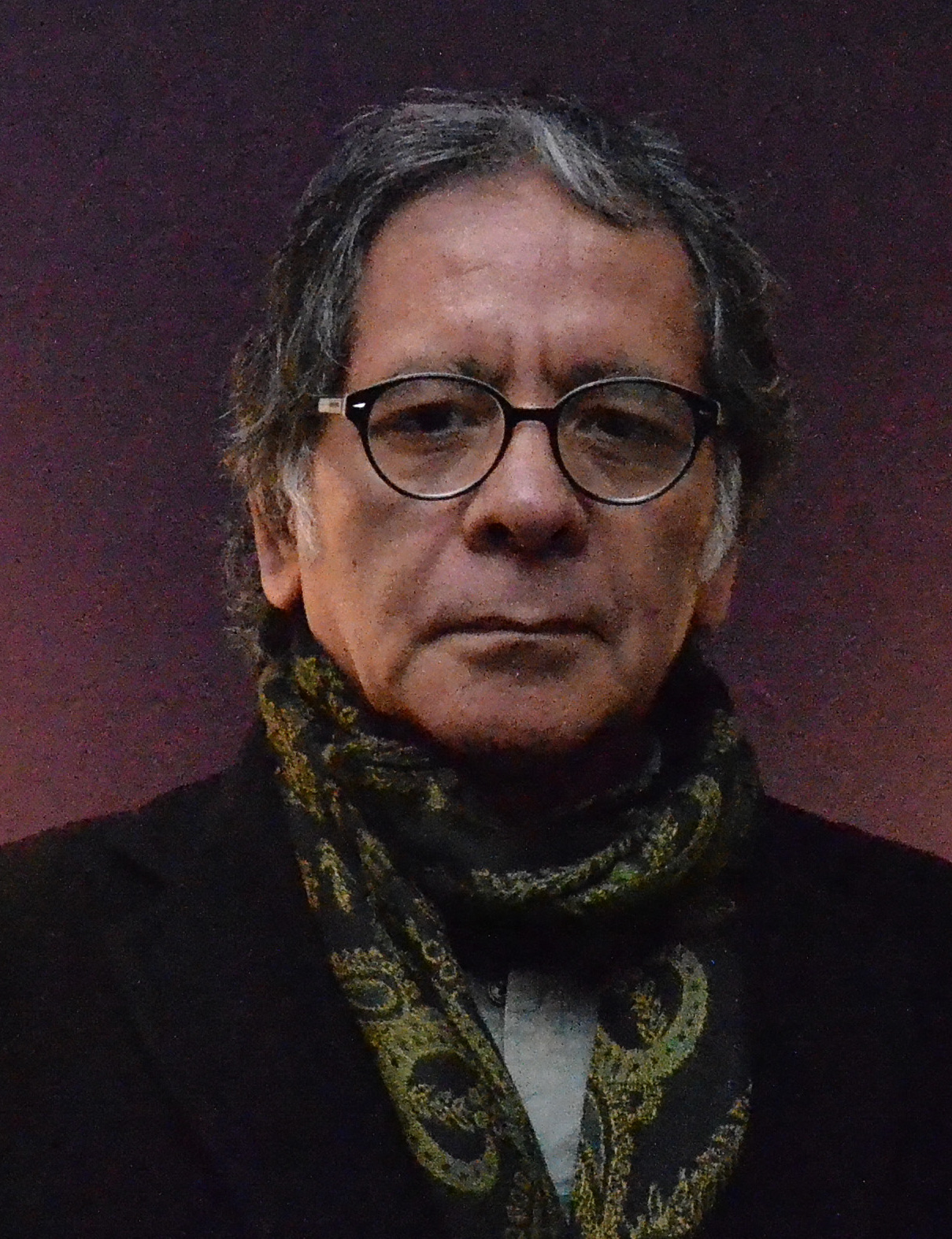
Patricio Contreras

Patricio Contreras (born December 15, 1947) is a Chilean-Argentine television, film and stage actor.

== Biography ==
Contreras was born in Santiago, Chile in 1947 and emigrated to neighboring Argentina following the 1973 coup d'état against left-wing President Salvador Allende, of whom Contreras was a vocal supporter. He was shortly afterwards cast in a number of minor Argentine cinema roles, notable among them a part in Adolfo Aristarain's 1978 crime thriller, La parte del león (The Lion's Share).

He married an up-and-coming Argentine actress, Leonor Manso, in 1981, and in 1983, he was given his first significant film role as the treacherous Sergeant Comini in Aristarain's Funny Dirty Little War. Contreras then gave what became perhaps his best-known performance as the targeted Professor Benítez in the Oscar-winning The Official Story (1985), for which he was awarded a Silver Condor. This was followed a leading role in Juan José Jusid's emotional look at exile, Made in Argentina (1986), which earned Contreras a Havana Film Festival Best Actor Award.

He appeared next to Gregory Peck and Jane Fonda in the 1989 movie Old Gringo.

He starred in fellow Chilean exile Miguel Littín's Sandino (1990), and the end of General Augusto Pinochet's dictatorship in 1990 allowed Contreras to return to Chile itself, where he starred as the lead in Ricardo Larraín's La Frontera (1991). Continuing to live and work in Argentina, he starred in Betty Kaplan's adaptation of Chilean writer Isabel Allende's Of Love and Shadows (1995), and to his film credits were added those in the local theatre, notably his work in a local, 1996-98 production of Samuel Beckett's Waiting for Godot (directed by his wife). His marriage suffered, however, and the couple were divorced in 2001. Among Contreras' later film roles some of the best-known are as writer Rodolfo Walsh's version of Hercule Poirot in Santiago Carlos Oves' Asesinato a Distancia (Murder at a Distance, 1998), and as the merciless detective in Eduardo Mignogna's fact-based La fuga (The Escape, 2001). He was reunited with his ex-wife for the stage in 2007 in her production of Sarah Kane's Blasted.

Contreras continues to live in Buenos Aires and remains a prolific film and stage actor.
