= Porotos de soja =

Porotos de soja is an Argentinian documentary film produced by the National Institute of Cinema and Audiovisual Arts (INCAA), directed by David Blaustein and Osvaldo Daicich, written by Daicicht. The film premiered on 21 May 2009.

== Synopsis ==
The film was based on the investigation of Mariana Dosso, Silvina Segundo and Osvaldo Daicich. It examines a conflict between the agricultural producers and the government that occurred in Argentina in 2008.

The conflict erupts when the producers, grouped in four employers' organizations, rejected the system of mobile retention to the exports of soy and sunflower established by the Resolution 125. In the new system quotas were replaced by an agreeable pricing standard where the percentage of compensation was equal to or greater than the international pricing standards of the product. One of the arguments was over an alleged fault regarding the Executive Powers ability to implement the measure.

The Argentine National Congress established the new system, finalizing the dispute on 17 July 2008.

The film presents the opinions of the philosopher Ricardo Forster, the journalist and economist Alfredo Zaiat and the graduate in communication Mariana Moyano.

== Production ==
The director declared that the idea of the film was born on April 1, 2008, when he decided to cover an act by President Fernández of Kirchner in support of this resolution. The initial aim was to produce a special program for television but afterwards with the prolongation and deepening of the conflict, it was transformed into a film. Produced by the state body National Institute of Cinema and Audiovisual Arts (NICAA) it was premiered in cinemas on 21 May 2009 and was exhibited on the state television channel two days later.

== Critical reception ==
The newspaper La Nación highlighted the camera work and said that the directors "attained to radio-graph this problem that had in check to the population, while sociologists, journalists, politicians and writers expose his points of view about a thematic that had an enormous transcendence for the agricultural sector". It added that the film attempts "to clarify some of the most complicated elements that were born from that resolution 125 and visits by means of a photography of undoubted quality fields, stays and places that saw affected by this governmental imposition" and stands out that "it shows, in definite, the fight of the men of the field for conserving his belongings, still by the expense of a fight that had few paragons in the history of the country".
