= Cleopatra (2003 film) =

- Directed by: Eduardo Mignogna
- Written by: Eduardo Mignogna; Silvina Chague
- Produced by: Pablo Bossi; Hugo E. Lauría; Carlos Luis Mentasti; Francisco Ramos; Ariel Saúl
- Starring: Norma Aleandro; Natalia Oreiro; Leonardo Sbaraglia; Héctor Alterio; Alberto de Mendoza
- Cinematography: Marcelo Camorino
- Edited by: Juan Carlos Macías
- Music by: Paco Ortega
- Release date: 14 August 2003
- Running time: 104 minutes
- Countries: Argentina; Spain
- Language: Spanish

Cleopatra is a 2003 Argentine-Spanish road comedy-drama film directed by Eduardo Mignogna and starring Norma Aleandro, Natalia Oreiro, Leonardo Sbaraglia and Héctor Alterio. The plot of the movie closely follows that of Thelma & Louise.

== Plot ==
Cleopatra (Aleandro) is an aged school teacher who struggles to maintain her unemployed husband (Alterio), who has depression and leads a resigned life. She meets with soap opera star Sandra (Oreiro), whom she befriends after a failed audition. Sandra is also frustrated with her life, mainly because her producer won't let her have her way, and because she is constantly pursued by the press. Together they embark, on a whim, upon a road trip that teams them with rural worker Carlos (Sbaraglia), who picks them up on the way.

== Cast ==
- Norma Aleandro as Cleopatra
- Natalia Oreiro as Sandra
- Leonardo Sbaraglia as Carlos
- Héctor Alterio as Roberto
- Alberto de Mendoza as Víctor
- Boy Olmi as Francis
