= Cousins (1989 film) =

1989 film

- Theatrical release poster
- Directed by: Joel Schumacher
- Written by: Stephen Metcalfe
- Based on: Cousin Cousine by Jean-Charles Tacchella
- Produced by: William Allyn
- Starring: Ted Danson; Isabella Rossellini; Sean Young; William Petersen; Norma Aleandro
- Cinematography: Ralf D. Bode
- Edited by: Robert Brown
- Music by: Angelo Badalamenti
- Production company: Paramount Pictures
- Distributed by: Paramount Pictures
- Release date: February 10, 1989
- Running time: 113 minutes
- Countries: United States; Canada
- Language: English
- Box office: $22 million

Cousins is a 1989 American romantic comedy film directed by Joel Schumacher and starring Ted Danson, Isabella Rossellini, Sean Young, William Petersen, Keith Coogan, Lloyd Bridges and Norma Aleandro. The film is an American remake of the 1975 French comedy Cousin Cousine, directed by Jean-Charles Tacchella. It is set in Seattle, Washington, but shot in Vancouver, British Columbia, Canada.

== Plot ==
Larry Kozinski and Maria Hardy meet at the wedding of Larry's uncle Phil and Maria's widowed mother Edie. The newly made cousins-by-marriage begin talking before realizing both their spouses, Tish and Tom, are missing. Tish and boorish Tom finally appear, claiming Tom, an auto salesman, was showing Tish a car and it broke down. Tom, a serial cheater, breaks off all his illicit relationships, then visits Tish, a make-up consultant, wanting to sleep with her again, though she brushes him off. Shortly after the wedding, Phil suddenly dies during a large family gathering. Phil's brother, Vince, arrives for the funeral. He offers to buy Phil's business from Edie, whom he is immediately attracted to.

A few weeks later, Maria meets with Larry to discuss Tish and Tom's affair. Larry initially acts nonchalant, then explodes in anger. When Maria arrives home, she tells Tom she had lunch with Larry, knowing it will upset him. Maria and Larry continue to meet, but commit to just being friends. They arrange to "accidentally" run into each other at a restaurant. Their spouses, Maria's mother, Edie, and Larry's dad, Vince, and son, Mitch are present. Everyone ends up sitting together. Tish abruptly leaves the table after seeing Larry and Maria flirtatiously gazing at each other. Maria follows Tish into the bathroom and sweetly explains that she and Larry were only playing a game to get back at her and Tom. She says it went too far and apologizes. Tish is touched by Maria's kindness.

Over time, Larry and Maria realize they are falling in love, and, one afternoon, they finally consummate their affair. Maria returns home late, and Tom obviously knows where she was. She confronts him about his infidelities and admits she loves Larry. Tom then calls Larry's house and threatens him. Larry's father, Vince, who was sleeping, answers the phone, and believes it is his brother, Phil calling from beyond the grave to warn him away from Edie. Larry returns from his day with Maria to discover that Tish is leaving; she wishes him well and they part amicably. Tish and Tom meet up at a hotel, but Tish notices Tom's changed behavior, but realizes he only wants temporary affairs, storms out.

Maria learns that her young daughter, Chloe has been instigating fights at school as a way of acting out. Maria ends her affair with Larry, saying she needs to devote herself to Chloe and her marriage.

Vince urges Larry to do what makes him happy, while he tells Edie that he loves her. At Vince and Edie's wedding, Larry sees Maria and asks her to dance, then to spend the rest of her life with him. Tom, overhearing this, angrily threatens to leave her. Maria chooses to be with Larry. In an epilogue, Larry and Maria are seen sailing away with their children, living a dream they both shared.

== Cast ==
- Ted Danson as Larry Kozinski
- Isabella Rossellini as Maria Hardy
- Sean Young as Tish Kozinski
- William Petersen as Tom Hardy
- Lloyd Bridges as Vincent Kozinski
- Keith Coogan as Mitch Kozinski
- Norma Aleandro as Edie Kozinski
- George Coe as Phil Kozinski
- Gina DeAngeles as Aunt Sofia
- Katharine Isabelle as Chloe Hardy (as Katie Murray)

== Production ==
The film was directed by Joel Schumacher, known mostly for his works St. Elmo's Fire and The Lost Boys. Although not identified as such, the locations were primarily shot around Vancouver, Canada, among the first times the city was featured so prominently, and led to the city being used as a film location much more. The score was composed by Angelo Badalamenti, who was extremely popular at the time from his work with Twin Peaks and Blue Velvet director David Lynch. Film Score Monthly described Badalamenti's melodic score as a definite asset to the film, underscoring several scenes with comical, Henry Mancini-like cues, and others with a delicate, poignant theme that blossoms into a waltz over the end credits.

== Reception ==
The film has received mixed reviews. Review aggregator Rotten Tomatoes reports that 56% of 9 film critics have given the film a positive review, with a rating average of 6 out of 10. Audiences surveyed by CinemaScore gave the film a grade of "A−" on scale of A+ to F. The film received two thumbs up from Siskel & Ebert, who were the only major critics to respond enthusiastically to the film upon its theatrical release. The film grossed a total of US$22 million, with an opening weekend of $3.5 million.

Individuals were praised as well—particularly Rossellini, whom critics found able to create a sweet, affectionate role after appearing in David Lynch's Blue Velvet. Other comments called the film "underrated" and "while not amongst the great movie romances, there is something undeniably touching—and dare I say heart-warming—about Cousins".
