= Frank Spano =

- Born: Frank Hernández Spano; Venezuela
- Citizenship: Panama; Venezuela; Spain
- Occupations: Actor, director, writer

Frank Hernández Spano is an actor, screenwriter and director with a cinema career spanning 25 years in more than 25 films.

As a scriptwriter and director, Spano made the short film Íntimos (2015), and several feature films.

Spano's film Hora menos (2011) was shown in the official section of the Malaga Festivals 2011, the Moscow Festival, the IFF Panama, the Mostra de São Paulo, and the Chicago Latino Film Festival. It won the award for best feature film at the International Festival of Las Palmas de Gran Canarias and Madrid Imagen.

HIDDEN (2017) was Spano's documentary feature film about extreme sport. He was writer/producer/director in a family thriller about organ trafficking: Humanpersons (2018)

Spano has performed as a monologue comedian on Paramount Comedy Spain.

== Filmography ==
=== As actor ===
==== Films ====
Year	Title	Role
1987	Macu, la mujer del policía	Simón
1991	Un sueño en el abismo	Luisín
1992	Fin de round	
1993	Golpes a mi puerta	Pablo
1995	Antes de morir	Julio
1996	La nave de los sueños	
1997	Pandemonium, la capital del infierno	Evelio
1998	The Raft: La Balsa	Frank
1998	Amaneció de golpe	Sgt. Benítez
2001	3 noches	Circe
2004	En ninguna parte	Juan
2005	Diario de un skin	Víctor
2007	Masala	Jairo
2009	Malamuerte	Pringao'
2010	Negocios	Marcos Durán
2012	Dale La Duke: De Los Ángeles (video short)	Guitar
2013	El consejero	Man with bar
2014	Escobar: Paraíso perdido	Christo
2015	Km 72	Dimas Luzardo
2016	1989: Los últimos de Filipinas	Emissary Tagalo

==== TV Series ====
Year	Title	Role	Notes
1999	Mujer secreta	Álvaro Gil	Season 8, episode 7
2001	Periodistas	Marcial's son	1 episode
2001–02	Policías, en el corazón de la calle	Bibi's husband	4 episodes
2001–02	Compañeros		2 episodes
2002–06	El comisario	Various roles	6 episodes: 1 episode in 2002; 3 episodes in 2004; 2 episodes in 2006
2003–08	Hospital Central	Richard (2003); Washington (2008)	2 episodes: 1 episode in 2003 as Richard; 1 episode in 2008 as Washington
2005	Lobos	Juan	1 episode
2007	Los hombres de Paco	Killer arrested by Lucas	5 episodes
2008	Aída	MC Killer	1 episode
2008	Sin tetas no hay paraíso		
2008	La que se avecina	Worker	1 episode
2009	¡A ver si llego!	Francisco	7 episodes
2011	Museo Coconut	Instructor NASSA	1 episode
2020	White Lines	Hitman 1	1 episode

=== As director ===
Year	Title	Credited as			Notes
Year	Title	Director	Writer	Producer	Notes
2005	Íntimos	Yes	Yes	No	Short film
2005	Hora menos	Yes	Yes	Yes	
2010	Negocios	No	No	Yes	Co-producer
2016	HIDDEN	Yes	Yes	Yes	Documentary
2018	Humanpersons	Yes	Yes	Yes	
202?	Gauguin and Canal	Yes	Yes	Yes	Pre-production

== Awards ==
Year	Association	Category	Work
1996	Premio Nacional Casa del Artista	Best Actor	Un Sueño en el Abismo
1997	Premio Festival de Cine Venezolano	Best Actor	Un Sueño en el Abismo, Fin de Round, La Nave de los Sueños and Golpes a mi Puerta
1999	Premio C.O.N.A.C.	Best Young Actor	Enrique Porte
1999	Premio Marco Antonio Ettedgui	Best Theater Actor	Pessoa: Escindido Insomne
1999	Premio Marco Antonio Ettedgui	Playwriter	Pessoa: Escindido Insomne
2000	Premio Nacional Casa del Artista	Best Film Actor	La Nave de los Sueños
2003	Festival de Teatro Breve de Madrid		Día de los enamorados
2006	Premio Nacional de Teatro INAC		Gauguin y el Canal
2011	International Film Festival Las Palmas de Gran Canaria	Best Longfeatured Film	Hora menos
2011	Premio Ópera Prima		Hora menos
2011	Premio Jurado Joven 16ª Festival Madridimagen		Hora menos
