= Francisca Güemes =

- Born: 1779
- Died: 1871 (aged 91–92)
- Conflicts: Argentine War of Independence

Francisca Güemes (1779–1871) was an Argentine woman involved in the movement advocating independence from Spain. A sister of Martín Miguel de Güemes, she, alongside her sister Macacha Güemes, is counted as a heroine of the Argentine War of Independence for her participation in the Gaucha War during the war of independence.

When she was only 16 years old, she co-founded the newspaper Sancho Panza. In 1809, she married a general, Sebastián Fructuoso de Figueroa y Toledo Pimentel.
