= Murdered at Distance =

Asesinato a distancia
- Directed by: Santiago Carlos Oves
- Written by: Santiago Carlos Oves
- Based on: The short story Asesinato a distancia by Rodolfo Walsh
- Produced by: Isidro Miguel; Alberto Trigo; Santiago Carlos Oves
- Starring: Patricio Contreras; Héctor Alterio; Laura Novoa; Fabián Vena
- Cinematography: Jorge Ruiz
- Edited by: Jorge Valencia
- Music by: Emilio Kauderer
- Production companies: Instituto Nacional de Cine y Artes Audiovisuales (INCAA) (support); Negocios Cinematográficos S.A. Proa Films
- Distributed by: Negocios Cinematográficos S.A. Distribution Company (1998, Argentina, theatrical)
- Release date: 12 February 1998
- Running time: 108 minutes
- Country: Argentina
- Language: Spanish

Asesinato a distancia (English: "Murdered at distance") is a 1998 Argentine crime drama film written and directed by Santiago Carlos Oves and starring Martín Adjemián, Héctor Alterio, Patricio Contreras and Laura Novoa. The film premiered on 12 February 1998 in Buenos Aires.

== Synopsis ==
When a detective investigates the suicide of a man, he finds that it may be a murder, and everybody seems to be a suspect.

== Cast ==
- Martín Adjemián ... Comisario Giménez
- Héctor Alterio ... Silverio Punes
- Elvia Andreoli ... Regina
- Patricio Contreras ... Daniel Hernández
- Miguel Dedovich ... Braulio
- Omar Galvan ... Loco
- Guillermo Hermida ... Osvaldo
- Horacio Marassi ... Sebastián
- Laura Novoa ... Herminia
- Gerardo Peyrano ... Ricardo
- Fabián Vena ... Lázaro
- Carlos Webber
