= El caso Matías =

1985 film by Aníbal Di Salvo

The case Matias
- The case Matias
- Directed by: Anibal Di Salvo
- Based on: The Argument, of Miguel Angel Materazzi
- Starring: Víctor Laplace; Dora Baret; Arturo Maly; Luis Medina Castro
- Cinematography: Carlos Torlaschi
- Edited by: Darío Tedesco
- Release date: 18 April 1985
- Running time: 90 minutes
- Country: Argentina
- Language: Spanish

El caso Matías is an Argentine film shot in Eastmancolor, directed by Aníbal Di Salvo based on his own screenplay, written in collaboration with Eduardo Mignogna, and inspired by the story by Miguel Ángel Materazzi. It was released on April 18, 1985, and starred Víctor Laplace, Dora Baret, Arturo Maly, Luis Medina Castro, and Javier Portales.

== Synopsis ==
A Polish man ends up locked up in an asylum in Argentina subjected to abuse from other patients and a nurse.

== Cast ==
- Víctor Laplace
- Dora Baret
- Arturo Maly
- Luis Medina Castro
- Javier Portales
- Eithel Bianco
- Alberto Drago
- Jorge Surraco
- Omar Pini
- Alfredo Alcón - Narrator
- Jorge Tortora - Narrator
- Paulino Andrada

== Reception ==
Mariano Vera, writing in La Prensa, stated: "The footage presents a second interpretation that effectively creates an almost suffocating atmosphere. Di Salvo also aims to depict inner exile."

Jorge Miguel Couselo, in Clarín, described it as: "An atypical expression within the national film scene... humble and irregular, delving into the realm of unadorned testimony."

Daniel López, writing in La Razón, expressed: "Routine and little artistic creation."

Manrupe and Portela commented: "This is the director's debut film, who previously experimented with the video Matías y los otros in 1981. It is an experimental film with formal limitations, yet undeniably sincere."
