= Norma Aleandro =

Argentine actress (b. 1936)

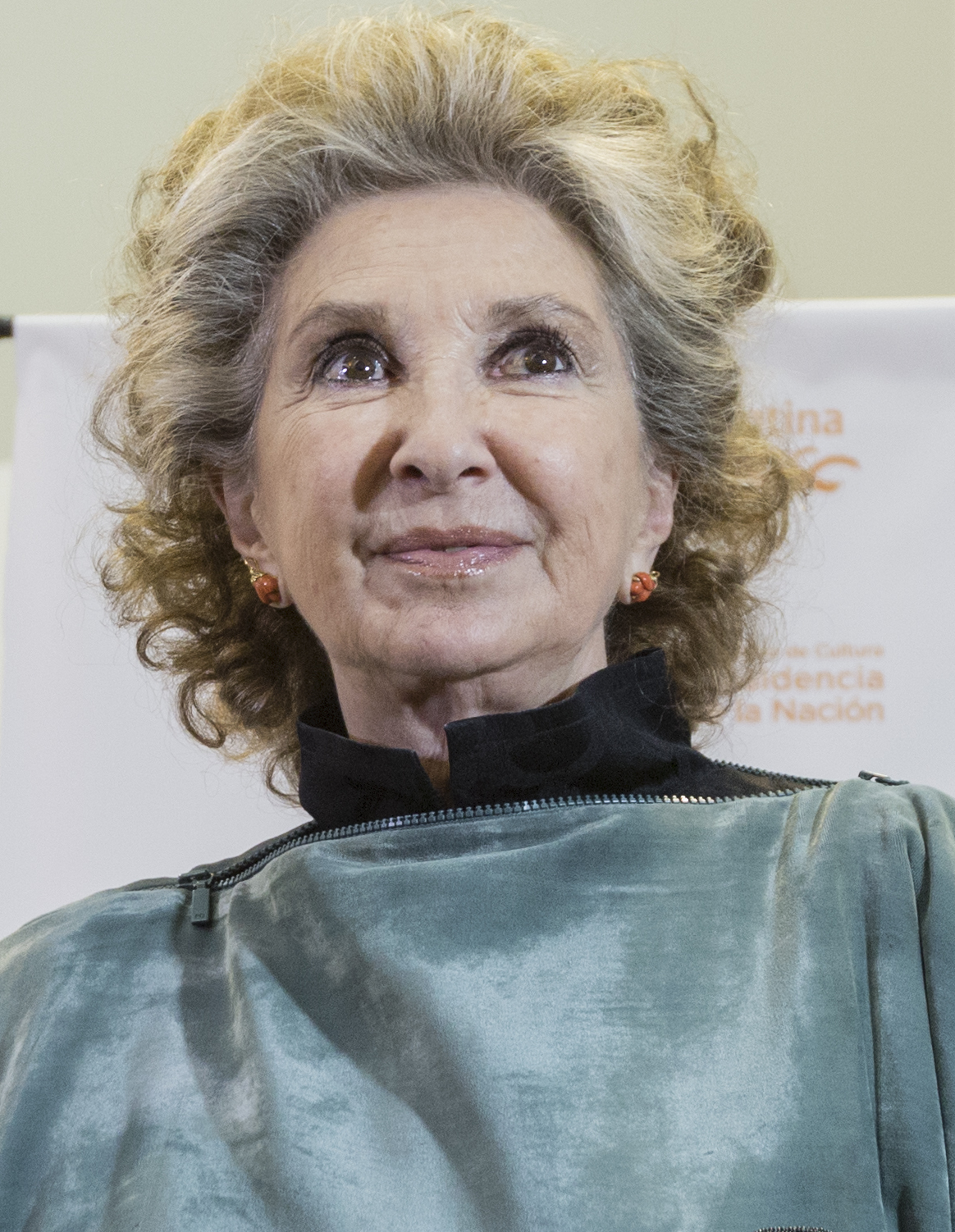
- Aleandro in 2017
- Born: 2 May 1936 (age 90); Buenos Aires, Argentina
- Occupation: Actress
- Years active: 1952–present
- Spouses: Oscar Ferrigno (divorced); Eduardo Le Poole
- Children: 1

Norma Aleandro (born 2 May 1936) is an Argentine actress. She is considered one of the most celebrated and prolific Argentine actresses of all time and is recognized as a cultural icon in her home country.

Aleandro starred in the 1985 film The Official Story, a role that earned her the Cannes Award for Best Actress. She has performed in other successful films like The Truce (1974), Cousins (1989), Autumn Sun (1996), The Lighthouse (1998), Son of the Bride (2001) and Cama Adentro (2005). For her performance as Florencia Sánchez Morales in the 1987 film Gaby: A True Story, she received a Golden Globe nomination and an Academy Award nomination for Best Supporting Actress.

Aleandro wrote the 1970 film The Inheritors and performed in various plays such as August: Osage County. Aleandro also appeared in the Argentine adaptation of BeTipul, the critically successful En terapia.

== Life and career ==
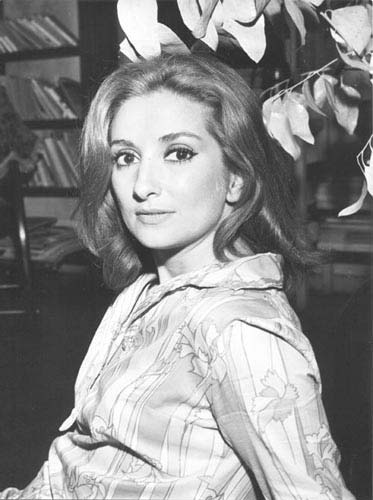
Aleandro in the 1950s or 1960s

Aleandro was born in Buenos Aires on 2 May 1936. She is the daughter of actors Pedro Aleandro and María Luisa Robledo and the sister of actress María Vaner. During the late 1970s, she was vocal about her progressive views and during the military dictatorship she was exiled to Uruguay. Later Aleandro moved to Spain and did not return to Argentina until after the military junta fell in 1983.

In 1985, her breakout role was the Argentine Academy Award-winning film The Official Story. For her acting in the film she won the Cannes Award for best actress.

She worked in several other Argentine movies such as the Academy Award-nominated Son of the Bride, Sol de Otoño, and El Faro.

Aleandro co-starred in a few Hollywood films such as One Man's War, with Anthony Hopkins, and Gaby: A True Story (1987) for which she received an Oscar nomination. She also had a minor role in Cousins (1989).

Back in Argentina, she returned to the stage with Master Class and won the María Guerrero award in 1996. The same year, she was honored as Ciudadano Ilustre de la Ciudad de Buenos Aires ("Illustrious Citizen of the City of Buenos Aires").

She has co-starred five times with fellow actor Héctor Alterio: Los siete Locos (1973), the Academy Award-nominated The Truce (1974), The Official Story (1985), Son of the Bride (2001) and Cleopatra (2003), the last three of which they played husband and wife.

In 2009, Aleandro appeared in The City of Your Final Destination, directed by James Ivory and co-starring Anthony Hopkins, Laura Linney and Charlotte Gainsbourg.

== Filmography ==
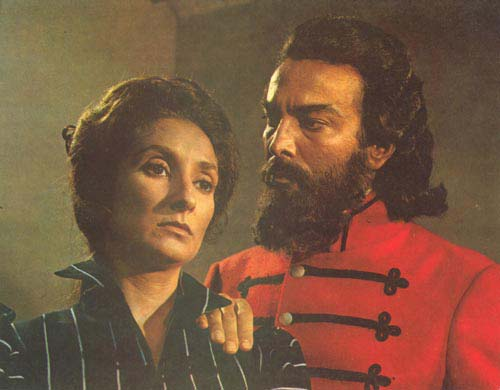
Aleandro (as Macacha Güemes) with Alfredo Alcón in the 1971 film Güemes: la tierra en armas

- La muerte en las calles (1952)
- Romeo y Julieta (1962) (TV)
- La casa de los Medina (1962) (TV)
- El último piso (1962)
- El amor tiene cara de mujer (1964) (TV)
- Cuatro mujeres para Adán (1966) (TV)
- Alias Buen Mozo (1966) (TV)
- Gente conmigo (1967)
- Los herederos (screenwriter) (1970)
- La fiaca (1969)
- Güemes: la tierra en armas (1971)
- Los siete locos (1972)
- La tregua (1974)
- La historia oficial (1985)
- Gaby: A True Story (1987)
- Cousins (1989)
- Cien veces no debo (1990)
- Vital Signs (1990)
- Artes especiales (1990)
- One Man's War (1991)
- Las tumbas (1991)
- Facundo, la sombra del tigre (1995)
- Carlos Monzón, el segundo juicio (1995)
- Sol de otoño (1996)
- El faro (1998)
- Corazón iluminado (1998)
- Una noche con Sabrina Love (2000)
- El hijo de la novia (2001)
- La fuga (2001)
- Todas las azafatas van al cielo (2002)
- Deseo (2002)
- Cleopatra (2003)
- Ay, Juancito (2004)
- 18-J (2004)
- Seres queridos (2004)
- Cama adentro (2004)
- Identidad perdida (corto - 2005)
- Pura sangre (2006)
- Patoruzito, la gran aventura (2006)
- The City of Your Final Destination (2009)
- Paco (2009)
- Música en espera (2009)
- Anita (2009)
- Andrés no quiere dormir la siesta (2009)
- Cuestión de principios (2010)
- Familia para armar (pre-production) (2010)
- La suerte en tus manos (2012)
- El paraíso (2022)

== Awards ==
=== Wins ===
- Cannes Award: Best Actress for The Official Story, 1985
- New York Film Critics Circle Awards: Best Actress for The Official Story, 1985
- Cartagena Film Festival: Best Actress for The Official Story, 1985
- David di Donatello: Best Foreign Actress for The Official Story, 1987
- Donostia-San Sebastián International Film Festival: Best Actress for Sol de Otoño, 1996
- Havana Film Festival: Best Actress for Sol de Otoño, 1996
- Gramado Film Festival: Best Latin Actress for Son of the Bride, 2002

=== Nominated ===
- Academy Award: Best Supporting Actress for Gaby: A True Story, 1987
- Golden Globe Award: Best Supporting Actress for Gaby: A True Story, 1987
- Martín Fierro Awards: for En terapia, 2012, 2013

=== Other awards ===
- Konex Award: Diamond Award in 2001
- Argentine Film Critics Association Awards: Best Supporting Actress for Son of the Bride, 2001; Best Actress for Sol de Otoño, 1996; Best Actress for The Official Story, 1985
- Martín Fierro Awards: Six awards throughout the years
- Tato Award: Best Lead Actress in Drama, for En terapia, 2013
- Association of Latin Entertainment Critics Awards: Best Character Actress for Cama Adentro, 2006; Best Actress for The Official Story, 1986
- Obie Award: Distinguished Performance (Actress) for About Love and Other Stories About Love, 1985
- Shakespeare Award: Distinguished career, given by Fundación Romeo Argentina, 2015
