= Gauguin & the Canal =

- Directed by: Frank Spano
- Written by: Frank Spano
- Produced by: Frank Spano
- Starring: Roberto Brindelli, Monica Grochi, Ash Olivera
- Production company: Garrra producciiones
- Release dates: February 25, 2022 (Semini); February 29, 2024
- Country: Panama
- Language: Spanish

Gauguin and The Canal is a Panamanian movie based on a theater play written by Venezuelan author Frank Spano (also the director and the screenwriter). The cast includes Roberto Brindelli, Monica Grocchi, Juan Carlos Avendaño, Dubaidi Avila, and Ash Olivera.

Gauguin and the Canal was screened in 67 Seminci Film Festival, 76th Salerno Film Festival in Italy, 39 Chicago Latino Film Festival, and the Marche Du film of Cannes.

The movie had a domestic release on February 29, 2024, in Panama.

== Plot ==
Whilst being a prisoner in his French Polynesian cabin, the painter Paul Gauguin was forced to paint a new masterpiece to save his five-year-old native son's disease and struggles between madness and sanity. He crashed into his memories of Panama, traveling and working in the Canal Construction in 1887 and the guilt of abandoning his family in Paris.

== Cast ==
- Roberto Brindelli as Gauguin
- Monica Gronchi as Aline
- Ash Olivera
- Dibaidi Avila as Gerdamen #1
- Juan Carlos Avendaño as Ben

== Production ==
In 2005, the author Frank Spano won the national prize Ricardo Miro for his play Gauguin & el canal. After that he went to seek funds for the film. After seven drafts he wrote the final script.
