= Spoils of War (film) =

2000 film by director David Blaustein

Botín de guerra
- Directed by: David Blaustein
- Written by: David Blaustein; Luisa Irene Ickowicz
- Produced by: David Blaustein
- Cinematography: Marcelo Iaccarino
- Edited by: Juan Carlos Macías
- Music by: Jorge Drexler
- Distributed by: Zafra Difusión S.A
- Release date: 11 April 2000
- Running time: 118 minutes
- Countries: Argentina; Germany
- Language: Spanish

Botín de guerra (English: Spoils of War) is a 2000 Argentine documentary film directed and written by David Blaustein with Luis Alberto Asurey. The film premiered on 11 April 2000 in Buenos Aires. David Blaustein won two awards for Best Director and a 2nd and 3rd.

== Overview ==
This second film from Argentine producer David Blaustein is a documentary concerning one particular result of Argentina's "Dirty War" period (1976–1983): the "appropriation" of children by members and friends of the right-wing military junta.

Students and young people considered political opponents of the regime were "disappeared" into a number of secret prisons spread throughout the country. Some opponents were couples or married, and in some cases the women prisoners were pregnant. It is estimated more than 500 children and infants were taken from their "disappeared" parents. In some cases these children were placed at orphanages or foster homes; in others, the children were simply taken by right-wing families to raise. In almost all cases, the children grew up without any knowledge of the circumstances of their adoption or the fate of their biological parents.

Thanks to the efforts of the Grandmothers of the Plaza de Mayo, at the time of the film's release, 66 children had been located by their relatives. The film is in part a history of the Association of the Grandmothers of the Plaza de Mayo, and the story of their search for the missing children. It depicts the reunion of children and their relatives.
