= Macu, The Policeman's Woman =

- Spanish: Macu, la mujer del policía
- Directed by: Solveig Hoogesteijn
- Written by: Solveig Hoogesteijn; Milagros Rodríguez
- Starring: Daniel Alvarado; María Luisa Mosquera; Frank Hernández
- Cinematography: Andrés Agustí
- Music by: Victor Cuica
- Production companies: Cinearte; Macu Films
- Release date: 1987
- Country: Venezuela
- Language: Spanish

Macu, The Policeman's Woman (Spanish: Macu, la mujer del policía) is a 1987 Venezuelan film directed by the Swedish-Venezuelan filmmaker Solveig Hoogesteijn. It is also known as simply Macu and as Macu, the Policeman's Wife. It is a crime drama, and based on a real story; it is also identified as the popular Venezuelan genre known as 'common crime'. It tells the story of a woman who must testify against her criminal policeman husband for murdering her lover, starring Daniel Alvarado, María Luisa Mosquera and Frank Hernández.

In analysis, the film has been related both to the story of Oedipus and to the Oedipus complex in Freudian theory.

== Synopsis ==
The murder of three young men is announced, including Simón (Frank Hernández), who was the lover of Macu (María Luisa Mosquera). A police investigation is opened, and Macu's husband, the police officer Ismael (Daniel Alvarado) is suspected. Scenes of the investigation are cut with flashbacks to Macu's relationships developing, with both Ismael and Simón. Ismael had been the lover of Macu's mother (Ana Castell) and groomed her as a young girl. At the end, Macu testifies against Ismael.

== Cast ==
As included by the BFI:

- Daniel Alvarado - Ismael
- María Luisa Mosquera - Macu
- Frank Hernández - Simón
- Tito Aponte
- Ana Castell
- Carmen Palma
- Iván Feo
- Ana María Paredes
- Angélica Bravo
- Ángel Gutierrez
- Móncia Juárez
- Douglas Reyes
- María Fernanda Urgelles
- Hugo Vargas
- Daniela Alvarado - Teresita

== Production and release ==
The film is based on the story of the 'Monster of Mamera', police officer Argenis Rafael Ledezma; he was jailed for 30 years in 1980. It is one of Venezuela's most successful films, having received 1,180,621 spectators. Until 2013 it was the second biggest box office hit in Venezuela. It took in more at the Venezuelan box office than films like Superman and E.T. the Extra-Terrestrial.

The 4-year-old daughter of star Alvarado, Daniela Alvarado, had a small role in the film., along with her brother, Carlos Daniel Alvarado.

== Analysis ==
Diana Robin and Ira Jaffe compare the film to Oedipus Rex, both in its initial murder mystery and in its psychoanalytic content, as it is based in triadic relationships throughout.

Karen Schwartzman, cited in Robin & Jaffe, "sees Macu as a powerful feminist statement". Schwartzman notes that while adulterous wives is a common story in Latin American cinema, Macu shows the woman prevailing as the hero. It is seen as a film of the New Latin American Cinema, by its subversion of culture and convention both in its nation and its genre: common crime films are typically based in machismo, but Macu is based in female subjectivity. Schwartzman argues that centering the narrative on the woman, and particularly doing this to reinvent the gender dynamics within a popular genre, turned the film into a "feminist project".

Schwartzman also uses other forms of analyzing the film; she notes that it uses chora (as in Kristeva) to structure the film. The chora is a space outside the familiar, which Schwartzman related, in terms of Macu, to the pre-Oedipal experience of infancy (as in Freud). To progress the narrative by using the chora, the film is structured around flashbacks and sound effects that recur (some of the sound effects listed in Robin & Jaffe are "drumbeats, flute tones, colors, creaking doors, fluttering wings, metallic tinkling, and silences"). A scene identified to represent the chora and the Oedpial psychoanalysis is one in which Macu chooses to return to her childhood apartment after discovering her husband is the murderer. While there, she re-lives the three defining moments in her psychosexual development: seeing her mother orgasm during sex with Ismael; rejecting the fact of her symbolic castration by refusing to take toilet paper when offered by Ismael; and being raped by Ismael before being given to him as a child bride. In this scene, Macu comes to terms with her past, and reinforces her relationship with her own children while shedding that she had with her mother. Schwartzman also notes that the scene gives the power of looking to Macu, as she breaks the fourth wall to level "a challenging gaze" on the Venezuelan audience, telling them that the narrative in the film reflected the society selling out its future.
