= The Lighthouse (1998 film) =

El faro
- Theatrical release poster
- Directed by: Eduardo Mignogna
- Written by: Graciela Aguirre; José Antonio Félez; Eduardo Mignogna; Santiago Carlos Oves
- Produced by: José Antonio Félez; Jorge Rocca
- Starring: Ingrid Rubio; Ricardo Darín
- Cinematography: Marcelo Camorino
- Edited by: Juan Carlos Macías; Nacho Ruiz Capillas
- Music by: Baby López Fürst
- Distributed by: Distribution Company
- Release dates: April 16, 1998 (Argentina); May 22, 1998 (Spain)
- Running time: 109 minutes
- Countries: Argentina; Spain
- Languages: Spanish; German

El faro (The Lighthouse) is a 1998 Argentine-Spanish drama film directed by Eduardo Mignogna. The film is also known in Spain as El faro del Sur.

The screenplay was a collaborative effort of Graciela Aguirre, José Antonio Félez, Eduardo Mignogna, and Santiago Carlos Oves. It features Ingrid Rubio, Jimena Barón, among others. The film won numerous awards including the Goya Awards for Best Foreign Film.

== Plot summary ==
Two sisters, Carmela (Ingrid Rubio) and Aneta (Jimena Barón/Florencia Bertotti), lose their parents in a car accident. Carmela is left lame with a badly scarred leg. Together they try to make a living and, despite their difficulties living together, have a deep love and mutual respect for each other. The orphaned sisters travel to Uruguay to stay with their aunts Encarna (Elcira Olivera Garcés) and Angelita (Ina Casares). On her own, Carmela begins working as a waitress and meets Andy (Ricardo Darín). Upon returning to Montevideo, they encounter Dolores (Norma Aleandro), a friend of their late mother. Carmela's romance with a man complicates her relationship with her sister. Over the years, the older sister's health gradually deteriorates.

== Cast ==
- Ingrid Rubio as Carmela (nicknamed Memé)
- Ricardo Darín as Andy
- Norma Aleandro as Dolores
- Norberto Díaz as Fernando
- Jorge Marrale as Miguel
- Boy Olmi as Richard
- Mariano Martínez as Javier
- Jimena Barón as Aneta as a child
- Florencia Bertotti as Aneta as a teen
- Ina Casares as Angelita
- Alejandra Aleano as Dolores
- Roberto Vallejos as Michi
- Oscar Ferrigno Jr. as Priest
- Elcira Olivera Garcés as Encarna
- Carmen Renard as Conserje
- Paola Krum as Sonia
- Mónica Lacoste as Dorita

== Exhibition ==
The film opened wide in Argentina on April 16, 1998. In Spain it opened on May 22, 1998. It was screened in the United States at the Miami Hispanic Film Festival, Miami, Florida.

=== Home media ===
The DVD (USA & territories, plus Canada) of El Faro was released on September 21, 2004, by Venevision.

== Awards ==
Wins

- Montréal World Film Festival: Best Actress, Ingrid Rubio, Prize of the Ecumenical Jury, Eduardo Mignogna; 1998.
- Argentine Film Critics Association Awards: Silver Condor, Best Actress (Mejor Actriz), Ingrid Rubio; Best Director (Mejor Director), Eduardo Mignogna; Best New Actress (Mejor Revelación Femenina), Jimena Barón; 1999.
- Goya Awards: Goya, Best Spanish Language Foreign Film (Mejor Película Extranjera de Habla Hispana), Eduardo Mignogna, Argentina; 1999.
- Oslo Films from the South Festival: Audience Award, Eduardo Mignogna; 1999.

Nominations

- Butaca Awards, Barcelona, Spain: Butaca, Best Catalan Film Actress (Millor actriu catalana de cinema), Ingrid Rubio; 1998.
- Montréal World Film Festival: Grand Prix des Amériques, Eduardo Mignogna; 1998.
- Festróia - Tróia International Film Festival: Golden Dolphin, Eduardo Mignogna; 1999.
- Argentine Film Critics Association Awards: Silver Condor, Best Art Direction/Production Design (Mejor Dirección Artística/Escenografía), Abel Facello; Best Cinematography (Mejor Fotografía), Marcelo Camorino; Best Film (Mejor Película); Best Music (Mejor Música), Baby López Fürst; Best New Actress (Mejor Revelación Femenina), Florencia Bertotti; Best Screenplay, Original (Mejor Guión Original), Eduardo Mignogna, Santiago Carlos Oves, Graciela Aguirre, and José Antonio Félez; 1999.
