= Conversations with Mother =

Conversaciones con mamá
- Poster
- Directed by: Santiago Carlos Oves
- Written by: Santiago Carlos Oves
- Produced by: Mónica Roza (executive producer)
- Starring: China Zorrilla; Eduardo Blanco
- Cinematography: Anibal Bosco
- Edited by: Liliana Nadal
- Music by: Pablo Sala
- Distributed by: Primer Plano Film Group S.A. Transeuropa Video Entertainment
- Release date: 5 April 2004
- Running time: 90 minutes
- Country: Argentina
- Language: Spanish

Conversations with Mother (Spanish: Conversaciones con mamá) is a 2004 Argentine comedy-drama film directed and written by Santiago Carlos Oves.

The film stars Eduardo Blanco as a middle-aged man who has just lost his job and who has about to lose his home, his wife and his entire Argentinian-bourgeois world and China Zorrilla as his octogenarian mother.

The film was nominated for three awards and won two awards with actress China Zorrilla winning at the 26th Moscow International Film Festival and nominated for a Silver Condor Best Actress Award at the Argentine Film Critics Association Awards in 2005.

The film premiered on 15 April 2004 in Argentina and appeared in over ten countries worldwide.

== Plot ==
Jaime, a middle aged Argentine man who has lost his job, is pressured by his wife to sell the apartment he maintains for his mother, who is 82, in order to keep their lifestyle intact. Jaime, over several conversations with his mother, tries to convince her to move in with them, so he can sell it. She knows that she wouldn’t be happy living with him, his wife, his two teenagers and his wife’s mother, so she resists. She eventually tells him that part of the reason that she doesn’t want to give up the apartment is that she has a boyfriend, who is 79, and whom she met when she discovered that he was eating the food she left out for the neighborhood cats. Talking with his mother and remembering the past helps him get in touch with his values of his youth. He decides to divorce his wife and to let her keep everything except the apartment.

=== Cast ===
- China Zorrilla ... Mamá
- Eduardo Blanco ... Jaime
- Ulises Dumont ... Gregorio
- Silvina Bosco ... Dorita
- Floria Bloise ... Lucrecia
- Nicolás Condito ... Chico
- Tito Mendoza ... Enfermero

=== Producers ===
- Pascual Condito .... producer
- Luisa Matienzo .... producer
- Santiago Carlos Oves.... producer
- Carlos Piwowarski .... associate producer
- Jorge Piwowarski .... associate producer
- Mónica Roza .... executive producer/producer
