= Alfredo Zaiat =

Argentine economist and journalist

- Born: Alfredo Zaiat; November 19, 1964 (age 61); Buenos Aires
- Education: University of Buenos Aires
- Occupations: economist, journalist, radio host, columnist

Alfredo Zaiat (born 19 November 1964) is an Argentine economist and journalist.

== Life ==
He has been working on the daily newspaper Página/12 since late eighties, where he is chief editor of Economics and Cash sections.
He is also columnist of the television program Con sentido público ("With public sense"), and radio host of the program Cheque en blanco ("Blank Check").
Moreover, for a two-year period (from 2007 to 2009) he coordinated the program "Iniciativa para la transparencia financiera" ("Initiative for financial transparency") led by Roberto Frenkel and Mario Damill. Furthermore, he performed as content advisor for the presentation of the gallery Economía y política. 200 años de historia ("Economics and politics. Two hundred years of history"), of the Casa Nacional del Bicentenario ("National Home of the Bicentennial").
In the academic environment, Zaiat is part of Programa Premio Amartya Sen ("Program Award Amartya Sen") of the School of Economic Sciences of the University of Buenos Aires, project led by Bernardo Kliksberg.

== Bibliography ==
At the moment, the journalist has published two books and collaborated with a major publication of Página/12.

- ZAIAT, Alfredo. Economía a contramano. Cómo entender la economía política, Planeta, 2012
- ZAIAT, Alfredo, et al. Historia de la economía argentina del siglo XX, La Página, 2008
- ZAIAT, Alfredo. Economistas o astrólogos, Educa, 2004
