= Autumn Sun =

- English DVD Cover
- Directed by: Eduardo Mignogna
- Written by: Eduardo Mignogna; Santiago Carlos Oves
- Produced by: Executive Producer: Lita Stantic; Eduardo Mignogna
- Starring: Norma Aleandro; Federico Luppi
- Narrated by: Bobby Flores
- Cinematography: Marcelo Camorino
- Edited by: Javier del Pino; Juan Carlos Macías
- Music by: Edgardo Rudnitzky
- Distributed by: Pathé
- Release date: 8 August 1996 (Argentina)
- Running time: 110 minutes
- Country: Argentina
- Language: Spanish
- Box office: 270,000 admissions (Argentina)

Autumn Sun (Spanish: Sol de otoño) is a 1996 Argentine drama film directed by Eduardo Mignogna and starring Norma Aleandro and Federico Luppi. It was written by Mignogna and Santiago Carlos Oves. Lita Stantic is the executive producer.

In a survey of the 100 greatest films of Argentine cinema carried out by the Museo del Cine Pablo Ducrós Hicken in 2000, the film was listed in the 20th position.

== Plot ==
Clara Goldstein (Norma Aleandro) is a Jewish woman who places a personal ad in the Buenos Aires newspaper requesting the company of an older Jewish man. Her sole respondent, Raúl Ferraro (Luppi) turns out to be a Gentile from Uruguay. Clara at first spurns him, but soon she realizes she needs him: Her brother is coming to visit her from Boston and she has been lying to him about being in a romantic relationship. Raúl goes along with the ruse. Not long after, the couple begin to fall in love.

== Cast ==
- Norma Aleandro as Clara Goldstein
- Federico Luppi as Raúl Ferraro
- Jorge Luz as Palomino
- Cecilia Rossetto as Leticia
- Roberto Carnaghi as Cohen
- Erasmo Olivera as Nelson
- Nicolás Goldschmidt as Wilson
- Gabriela Acher as Silvia

== Reception ==
Critic Russell Smith lauded the film and especially the acting; he wrote, "Not only do Luppi (Men with Guns, Cronos) and Aleandro present images of mature ardor that compare favorably with the late-career work of Mastroianni (Marcello Mastroianni) and Loren (Sophia Loren), they also impressively overcome certain Hollywood-like contrivances of plot and dialogue the latter two actors seldom had to contend with. It's a tribute to these stars that, even given the trite situation of the love-shy odd couple gradually facing the inevitable, every halting step they take toward each other feels like a mini-triumph of love's power over the schoolmarmish intellect. They portray with touching specificity what it's like to crave total surrender to love even after long years of experience have proven the foolhardiness of such blind leaps. Not even the blatantly market-tested ending (a malady that seems to be spreading worldwide like Hong Kong flu) detracts from the pleasure of this admirable, eminently watchable date flick. Well worth the price of admission, whether or not you qualify for the senior discount."

It was the most popular Argentinian film for the first nine months of the year with 270,000 admissions.

== Awards ==
=== Wins ===
- San Sebastián International Film Festival; OCIC Award; Eduardo Mignogna; Silver Seashell Best Actress, Norma Aleandro; 1996
- Argentine Film Critics Association Awards; Silver Condor; Best Actor, Federico Luppi; Best Actress, Norma Aleandro; Best Cinematography, Marcelo Camorino; Best Director, Eduardo Mignogna; Best Film; 2007
- Goya Awards; Goya; Best Spanish Language Foreign Film, Argentina; 1997
- Oslo Films from the South Festival; Honorable Mention, Eduardo Mignogna; 1997

=== Nominations ===
- Argentine Film Critics Association Awards: Best Music, Edgardo Rudnitzky; Best Screenplay (Original), Eduardo Mignogna and Santiago Carlos Oves; Best Supporting Actress, Gabriela Acher; 2007
- San Sebastián International Film Festival; Golden Seashell, Eduardo Mignogna; 2006
