= La fuga (2001 film) =

2001 film by Eduardo Mignogna

- Theatrical release poster
- Directed by: Eduardo Mignogna
- Written by: Jorge Goldenberg; Graciela Maglie; Eduardo Mignogna
- Produced by: José Antonio Félez; Carlos Mentasti
- Starring: Ricardo Darin; Patricio Contreras; Miguel Angel Sola; Gerardo Romano; Ines Estevez
- Cinematography: Marcelo Camorino
- Edited by: Juan Carlos Macías
- Music by: Federico Jusid
- Distributed by: Líder Films
- Release date: 24 May 2001 (Argentina)
- Running time: 117 minutes
- Country: Argentina
- Language: Spanish

La fuga (The Escape) is a 2001 Argentine film directed by Eduardo Mignogna.

The picture stars Mignogna's friend and frequent collaborator, Ricardo Darin, as well as Miguel Angel Sola, Gerardo Romano, Patricio Contreras, Ines Estevez, Alejandro Awada and Norma Aleandro.

== Plot ==
On 17 April 1928, seven inmates from the National Penitentiary in Buenos Aires manage to escape by tunneling their way out of prison: Laureano Irala, an ex-con, Domingo 'El Pibe' Santalón, an expert poker player and forger, Julio 'El Profesor' Bordiola, a bookmaker, Tomás Opitti, an airplane pilot, Belisário 'El Pampa' Zacarías and Omar 'El Turco' Zajur, both kidnappers and murderers, and Camillo Vallejo, an anarchist. They accidentally reach a coal store run by an old couple and succeed in leaving the place: however, El Pampa dies after being crushed by the falling tunnel and the old lady dies of a heart attack soon after the inmates flee.

Soon after the event, Police commissioner Duval begins investigating the case as the men part ways: Vallejo attempts to bomb a government coach, but is killed when the explosive fails to detonate at the right time; Zajur reunites with El Pampa's widow, La Varela, and it is revealed they were on a relationship; Santaló seeks his former boss, gambler Pedro Escofet, in order to resume his gambling ways and to reunite with Escofet's wife Tabita, with whom he has an affair; Irala returns to the coal store out of guilt for the old lady's death, but the old man mistakes him for his nephew who lives in Mendoza and asks him to move in; and Tomás escapes in a biplane to an aero club in Entre Rios.

In a series of flashbacks, it is revealed that Tomás flew a terrorist and was mistaken as his accomplice, which prompted Duval and his men to shoot and kill his wife and son and arrest him, even though acknowledging his innocence. Bordiola shot a debtor in front of his 10-year-old daughter when he wrongfully assumed the man was about to kill him and later married piano student Rita Baldini, an underage girl who eventually cheated on him with a horse dealer named Ricardo Cedeyra; enraged by her confession, he shot Cedeyra dead and was sent to prison. While devising the escape plan, El Pampa tells Zajur he wishes to build a monument to honour them in case they succeed.

In the present time, upon landing in Entre Ríos, Tomás witness his fellow co-pilot being gunned down by Duval and his men in an ambush set to kill him. Meanwhile, Santaló gambles against Víctor Ganz, a ruthless card player, in a no-limit game; the match goes into the night and after dawn, but Ganz does not seem to get tired at all. Santaló eventually collapses of exhaustion and Ganz is declared the winner; believing they have made an agreement to rip him off, Escofet shoots Santaló in the stomach only to be subsequently shot dead by Tabita: it is revealed she is the one who made an arrangement with Ganz, who are actually identical twin brothers who switched places with each other between breaks. She flees with the brothers and the money, leaving Santaló to die.

Meanwhile, Bordiola goes to see Rita - who has been visiting him for two years in prison despite his coldness towards her - but learns she has committed suicide: in a letter, she reveals to be the 10-year-old girl whose father Bordiola shot and how she planned to avenge her father's death by marrying his killer but could not carry on as she fell in love with him. Tomás ambushes Duval in a brothel, kidnaps and drags him to an abandoned airfield and ties him to the plane's engine, whereupon he starts it and stands aside as Duval is spun to death, finally avenging his family's murder. Soon after the old man's death, Irala inherits and sells the coal store, walking away with the money.

Eight years later, during the inauguration of the Obelisco, the monument is vandalized with the graffiti "Monument dedicated to the inmates who escaped the prison, April 17th, 1928". In the crowd, a laughing Zajur pictures his fellow inmates singing together in their prison uniforms; he and Irala, who is also among the crowd, share a quick glance and a smile before Irala walks away.

== Cast ==
- Miguel Angel Sola as Laureano Irala, an ex-con and narrator of the story.
- Ricardo Darín as Domingo 'El Pibe' Santaló, an expert poker player and forger imprisoned for printing fake money.
- Gerardo Romano as Dr. Julio 'El Profesor' Bordiola, a bookie imprisoned for killing his wife's lover.
- Alejandro Awada as Tomás Opitti, a biplane pilot mistaken for a terrorist and imprisoned by the city's police commissioner.
- Oscar Alegre as Belisario 'El Pampa' Zacarías, a kidnapper and murderer who share a homosexual relationship with Omar.
- Vando Villamil as Omar 'El Turco' Zajur, a kidnapper and murderer who share a homosexual relationship with El Pampa.
- Alberto Jiménez as Camilo Vallejo, a quiet anarchist imprisoned for acts of terrorism.
- Norma Aleandro as La Varela, El Pampa's widow.
- Patricio Contreras as Commissioner Duval, the man tasked with capturing the inmates.
- Ana Celentano as Opitti's wife.
- Inés Estévez as Tabita, Escofet's wife.

== Awards ==
Wins

- Argentinean Film Critics Association Awards: Silver Condor - Best Art Direction - Margarita Jusid; Best Screenplay, Adapted, Graciela Maglie, Jorge Goldenberg and Eduardo Mignogna; 2002.
- Goya Awards: Goya - Best Spanish Language Foreign Film - Eduardo Mignogna, Argentina; 2002.
- Los Angeles Latino International Film Festival: Jury Award - Best Film, Eduardo Mignogna; 2002.
- Sant Jordi Awards: Sant Jordi - Best Foreign Actor, Ricardo Darín; 2002.
