= Coup at Daybreak =

1998 Venezuelan film

- English: Coup at Daybreak
- Directed by: Carlos Azpúrua
- Written by: José Ignacio Cabrujas
- Produced by: Consuelo Delgado
- Starring: Daniel Lugo; Ruddy Rodríguez; Héctor Mayerston; Elba Escobar; Yanis Chimaras; Elizabeth Morales; Vicente Tepedino; Karl Hoffman
- Cinematography: Adriano Moreno
- Edited by: Sergio Curiel
- Music by: Luis Paniagua
- Production companies: Caralcine; Ibsen Suarez; Audiovisuales Nebli; Voice Art; TVE
- Release date: 1998
- Running time: 97 minutes

Coup at Daybreak, also Amaneció de golpe, is a 1998 Venezuelan film based on the February 1992 coup d'état attempt.

== Synopsis ==
The film mainly focuses on a group of rebel soldiers attacking the presidential residence in La Casona. It juxtaposes this with showing the personal lives of residents of the La Casona area during the coup overnight.

It opens with a military convey traveling through the east of Caracas towards La Casona. Along the road, the rebel soldiers see a nudist couple (the woman portrayed by Ruth Puebla) in the bushes. They then stop in the poorer part of the area, where they are begged for help by three characters wanting to travel to a hospital; resolute on their mission, the convoy continues and reaches the street of the presidential residence La Casona, attacking everything.

Some of the residents nearby is the couple Miguel (Daniel Lugo) and Isbelia (Ruddy Rodríguez), who are in the middle of breaking up as Miguel confesses his affair with Paloma (Beatriz Santana). Miguel leaves the house, going to Paloma's by car, but changes his mind and returns, leaving Paloma in the car outside as the coup begins. Caught in the crossfire, a soldier rescues Paloma just as the car is hit by explosives, leading her into Miguel and Isbelia's house. The couple continue to argue: Isbelia is a current affairs journalist, but Miguel accuses her of not really caring about the state of affairs.

Closer to the presidential residence lives the middle-class family headed by Beatriz (Elizabeth Morales). She has just brought her children back from Miami and is living at her parents' house on the street, wanting to separate from her cheating husband Rafael (Yanis Chimaras), too. Rafael is a high-ranking figure in the military and closely attached to the government. Rafael's father, Aníbal (Héctor Mayerston) is a corrupt businessman who works with the government and also does not want the coup to succeed, lest he be uncovered. In the houses next to Beatriz live other important people: the family of the Mexican ambassador, including his ambitious son, and a foreign corrupt government-associated businessman. During the night's events, the son and the foreign businessman die.

Shortly before the end of the film, the nudist couple are seen again in a striking scene where actress Puebla is seen fully nude. At the end, the rebels surrender and their leader, Hugo Chávez, appears on television to say that the objectives had not been accomplished por ahora (for now), a famous line that gave him enough popularity to win the 1998 presidential elections.

== Cast ==
As listed in discussion:

- Daniel Lugo
- Ruddy Rodríguez
- Elba Escobar
- Yanis Chimaras
- Dalila Colombo
- Héctor Mayerston
- Víctor Cuicas
- Manuel Aranguiz
- Gonzalo Cubero
- Frank Spano
- Vicente Tepedino
- Eric Ekval
- Raúl Fraire
- Isabel Herrera
- Karl Hoffman
- Cecilia Martínez
- Asdrúbal Meléndez
- Elizabeth Morales
- Ruth Puebla
- Gabriel Retes
- Lucila Balzarretti
- Beatriz Santana

== Response ==
Though the film was made before Chávez came to power, it has been seen as a defense of Chavismo and compared to Román Chalbaud's film El Caracazo. It has been praised by Chávez.

It was nominated for the Best Foreign Spanish-language Film at the 1999 Goya Awards.

José Cirera wrote that though the film shows clips of the Caracazo, protests used at the time to justify the coup, it does not make a political statement defending or not the coup. After the Caracas drone attack in 2018, El Nacional referenced the film and its title in relation to the attack.
