= Knocks at My Door =

1994 film

- Film poster
- Directed by: Alejandro Saderman
- Written by: Alejandro Saderman; Juan Carlos Gené (play)
- Starring: Verónica Oddó
- Release date: 1 September 1994
- Running time: 105 minutes
- Country: Venezuela
- Language: Spanish

Knocks at My Door (Spanish: Golpes a mi puerta) is a 1994 Venezuelan drama film directed by Alejandro Saderman. Adapted from the play by Juan Carlos Gené, the film was selected as the Venezuelan entry for the Best Foreign Language Film at the 67th Academy Awards, but was not accepted as a nominee.

== Plot ==
A fugitive bursts into the home of two Catholic nuns. In an attempt to save his life, they hide him from the marauding military patrols, despite the danger they face if they are caught.

== Cast ==
- Verónica Oddó as Ana
- Elba Escobar as Ursula
- Juan Carlos Gené as Mayor Cerone
- José Antonio Rodríguez as Obispo
- Ana Castell as Severa
- Mirta Ibarra as Amanda
- Frank Spano as Pablo

== Year-end lists ==
- Honorable mention – William Arnold, Seattle Post-Intelligencer

== See also ==
- List of submissions to the 67th Academy Awards for Best Foreign Language Film
- List of Venezuelan submissions for the Academy Award for Best Foreign Language Film
