= David Blaustein (filmmaker) =

Argentinian filmmaker (1953–2021)

- Born: 24 August 1953; Buenos Aires, Argentina
- Died: 16 August 2021 (aged 67)
- Other name: Coco Blaustein
- Occupations: Film director, screenwriter, film producer

David Blaustein, known as Coco Blaustein (24 August 1953 – 16 August 2021) was an Argentine film director and screenwriter, known for his involvement in politically themed cinema. He was a member of the Argentine Academy of Cinematography Arts and Sciences.

== Personal life and death ==
Blaustein was born in Buenos Aires on 24 August 1953 in a Jewish family.

He died on 16 August 2021, at age 67, in a Buenos Aires clinic, five days after suffering a stroke.

== Filmography ==
Producer

- Porotos de soja (2009)
- Hacer patria (2006)
- La vereda de la sombra (2005)
- Germán (mediometraje) (2005)
- Cuando los santos vienen marchando (2004)
- Papá Iván (2004)
- (H) Historias cotidianas (2001)
- Botín de guerra (2000)
- Malvinas, historia de traiciones (1984)

Director

- Porotos de soja (2009)
- Fragmentos rebelados (2009)
- Hacer patria (2006)
- Botín de guerra (2000)
- Cazadores de utopías (1996)

Screenwriter

- Germán (medium-length film) (2005)
- Botín de guerra (2000)
- Ciudad oculta (short documentary) (1980)

Actor

- 24 horas (Algo está por explotar) (1997)

General consulting

- Rerum Novarum (2001)

== Bibliography ==
- Manrupe, Raúl; Portela, María Alejandra (2003). Un diccionario de films argentinos II 1996-2002. Buenos Aires: Editorial Corregidor. ISBN 950-05-1525-3.
- Piscitelli, Alejandro. "Cindocumentando el pasado. Cuando el subjetivismo lo invade todo".
