= Amor de otoño =

1996 film directed by José Conrado Castelli

- Directed by: José Conrado Castelli
- Written by: José Conrado Castelli
- Starring: Héctor Gióvine, María Marchi, Ricardo Alanis, and Alejandro Duncan
- Cinematography: Víctor González
- Edited by: Darío Tedesco
- Production company: J.C.Castelli Productor Cinematográfico y Asoc.
- Distributed by: Instituto Nacional de Cine y Artes Audiovisuales
- Release date: 1996
- Running time: 105 minutes
- Country: Argentina
- Language: Spanish

Amor de otoño ("Autumn Love") is a 1996 Argentine film, directed by José Conrado Castelli, who also wrote the screenplay based on Anton Chekhov's short story The Cigar. The film premiered on November 28, 1996, and features a cast including Héctor Gióvine, María Marchi, Ricardo Alanis, and Alejandro Duncan.

The film includes costumes by Paco Jamandreu, who died on the set.

== Synopsis ==
Based on a Chekhov story adapted to the modern era, the film follows the journey of a mature woman as she reassesses her marriage during a countryside outing with friends.

== Cast ==
- Héctor Gióvine
- Maria Marchi
- Ricardo Alanis .... Castro Rendón
- Alejandro Duncan
- Celia Camus
- Néstor Franco
- Gustavo Balbuena

== Reception ==
In their book Un diccionario de films argentinos: 1996-2002, Raúl Manrupe and María Alejandra Portela note that it is a "serious candidate for the worst Argentine film in history", heavily criticizing the film's direction and waste of the actors "in morose gestures and existential voids that do not interest anyone", and lambasting the director for "stubbornly literally destroying the Chekhovian tale by inventing useless stereotypes".
