= Santiago Carlos Oves =

Argentine film director and screenwriter

- Born: 14 September 1941; Buenos Aires, Argentina
- Died: 2 May 2010 (aged 68); Buenos Aires, Argentina
- Occupations: Film director, screenwriter
- Years active: 1983-2010

Santiago Carlos Oves (14 September 1941 – 2 May 2010) was an Argentine film director and screenwriter. He directed nine films between 1983 and 2009. His 2004 film Conversations with Mother was entered into the 26th Moscow International Film Festival.

== Selected filmography ==
- Autumn Sun (1996)
- Murdered at Distance (1998)
- The Lighthouse (1998)
- Conversations with Mother (2004)
