= Macacha Güemes =

Argentine heroine

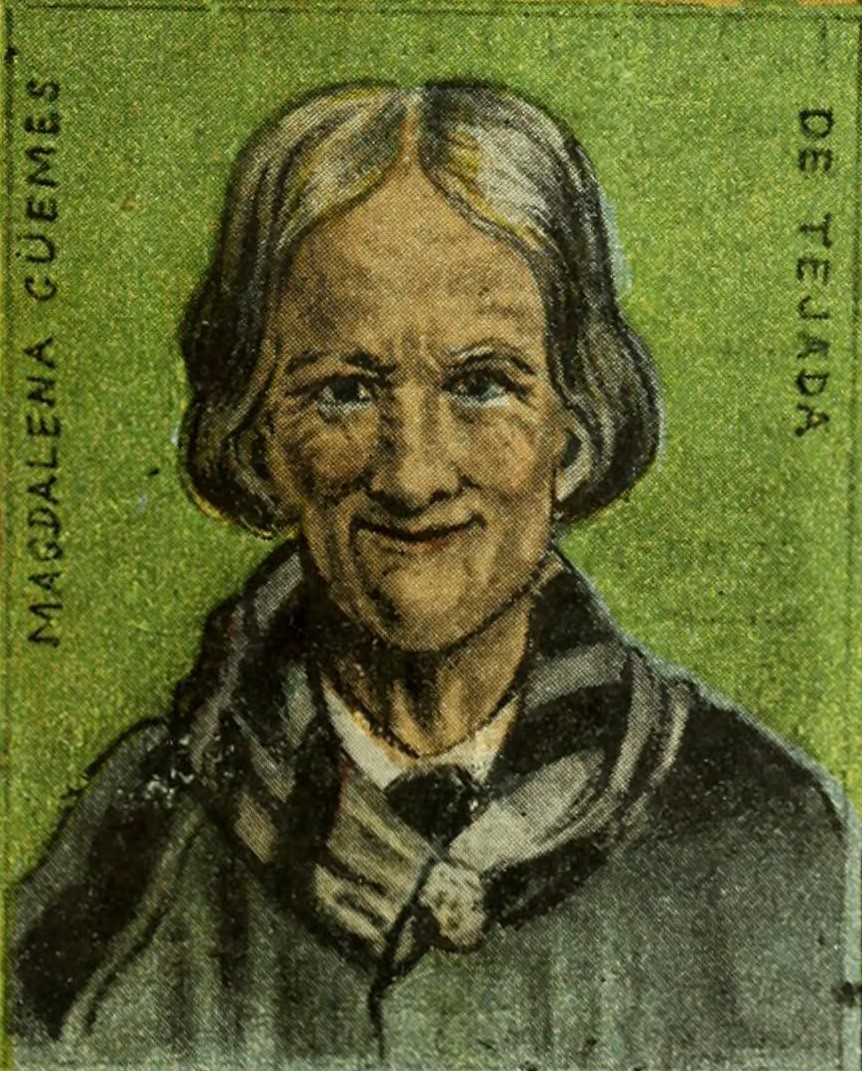
Macacha Güemes

Macacha Güemes (full name María Magdalena Dámasa de Güemes) (11 December 1787-7 June 1866) was an Argentine heroine. A sister of Martín Miguel de Güemes, she, alongside her sister Francisca Güemes, is considered as a heroine of the Argentine War of Independence for her participation in the Gaucho War, during the war of independence.
