= Eduardo Mignogna =

Argentine film director and screenwriter

- Born: Eduardo Mario Mignogna; August 17, 1940; Buenos Aires
- Died: October 6, 2006 (aged 66); Buenos Aires

Eduardo Mignogna (August 17, 1940 – October 6, 2006) was an Argentine film director and screenwriter.

== Filmography ==
- 1975 - La Raulito en libertad (writer)
- 1983 - El Desquite (writer)
- 1983 - Evita, quien quiera oír que oiga (writer and director)
- 1984 - Desafío a la vida: Discapacitados TV (writer and director)
- 1985 - El Caso Matías (writer)
- 1985 - Misiones, su tierra y su gente TV (writer and director)
- 1986 - Mocosos y chiflados TV (writer and director)
- 1987 - Horacio Quiroga: entre personas y personajes TV (writer and director)
- 1988 - La salud de los ángeles I y II TV (writer and director)
- 1988 - La vivienda de los ángeles I y II TV (writer and director)
- 1990 - Flop (writers and director)
- 1991 - El beso del olvido (writer and director)
- 1993 - Matar al abuelito (writer)
- 1996 - Sol de otoño (writer and director)
- 1998 - El Faro (writer and director)
- 1998 - Lorca en el Río de la Plata TV (writer and director)
- 2000 - Adela (writer and director)
- 2001 - La Fuga (writer and director)
- 2003 - "Ensayo" TV Series (unknown episodes)
- 2003 - Un día en el paraíso (writer)
- 2003 - Cleopatra (writer and director)
- 2005 - El Viento (writer and director)
- 2007 - La Señal (writer)

== Background ==
All the films directed by Mignogna were written by himself. He frequently worked with the same actors, either as a screenwriter, director or both - Ricardo Darín (4 times), Norma Aleandro (4 times), Federico Luppi (3 times), Antonella Costa (2 times), Vando Villamil (2 times), Roberto Vallejos (2 times) and Inés Estévez (2 times). Because of Mignogna's death in 2006 due to cancer, La señal - a film for which he had recently completed the writing of the script - he was not able to direct the movie. Its protagonist, Ricardo Darín, close friend and frequent collaborator, took over direction as a homage to Mignogna. The movie is dedicated to him.
