= Juan Carlos Macías =

Argentinian film director

Juan Carlos Macias
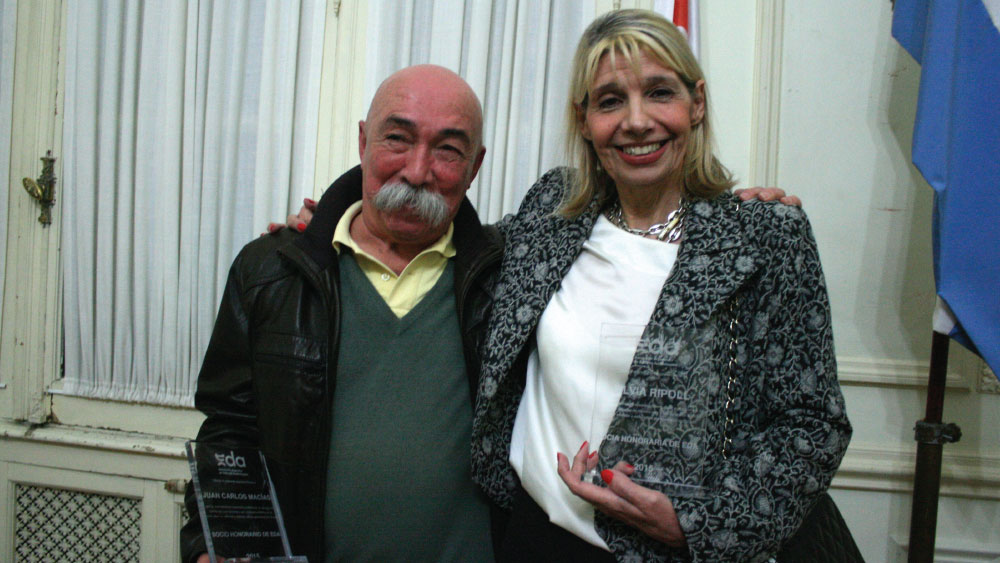
- Born: April 28, 1945
- Occupation: film editor

Juan Carlos Macias (born April 28, 1945) is an Argentine film editor. He is sometimes credited as: Juan C. Macías.

Some of the films he has edited have been critically well received: The Official Story (1985), Old Gringo (1989), and Kamchatka (2002).

== Filmography (partial) ==
- La Historia oficial (1985) a.k.a. The Official Story
- Abierto de 18 a 24 (1988)
- Old Gringo (1989)
- Cenizas del paraíso (1997)
- Spoils of War (2000)
- Plata Quemada (2000) Burnt Money
- La Fuga (2001) a.k.a. The Escape
- Micaela, una película mágica (2002)
- Kamchatka (2002)
- Ciudad del sol (2003)
- Noite de São João (2003)
- Cleopatra (2003)
- Un Día en el paraíso (2003)
- Vivir Intentando (2003)
- Memoria del saqueo (2004) a.k.a. Social Genocide
- La Dignidad de los nadies (2005) a.k.a. The Dignity of the Nobodies
- El Cobrador: In God We Trust (2006)
- Hacer patria (2006)
