= Grupo Telefe =

Argentine media company

- Trade name: Televisión Federal S.A.
- Type: Private
- Industry: Mass media
- Founded: October 20, 1989; 36 years ago
- Founders: Avelino Porto; Editorial Atlántida; Soldatti family Luis Zanón; Televisoras Provinciales
- Headquarters: Ave. Sir Alexander Fleming 1101, Martínez, Buenos Aires Province, Argentina
- Owner: Televisión Litoral S.A. (84.14%); Atlántida Comunicaciones S.A. (12.53%); Enfisur S.A. (3.33%)
- Parent: Grupo Televisión Litoral
- Website: mitelefe.com

Grupo Telefe (legally Televisión Federal S.A.) is an Argentine media company founded on October 20, 1989. The company holds and operates the license for LS84 TV Channel 11 in Buenos Aires, the flagship station of the Telefe television network, as well as stations in Córdoba and Santa Fe. Headquartered in Martínez, Buenos Aires Province, the company has been owned by Grupo Televisión Litoral since October 23, 2025.

== History ==
Televisión Federal S.A. was established in 1989 with the aim of participating in the bidding process to operate a television station in the city of Buenos Aires. On September 21, 1989, President Carlos Menem, two months after taking office, decided to re-privatize Buenos Aires' Channels 11 and 13. Jorge Rachid, then Secretary of the Press, alleged that prosecutor Germán Moldes had offered him more than US$1.3 million in bribes to have Channel 11 privatized in favor of Franco Macri and businessman Silvio Berlusconi. Rachid also claimed that the prosecutor acted as the judicial operator of José Luis Manzano, another media businessman.

At the time, the company's principal shareholders included Televisoras Provinciales S.A., which consisted of Dicor Difusión Córdoba S.A. – Channel 8 of Córdoba, Radiodifusora de Rosario Rader S.A. – Channel 5 of Rosario, Neuquén TV S.A. – Channel 7 of Neuquén, Radio Visión Jujuy S.A. – Channel 7 of San Salvador de Jujuy, Emisora Arenales de Radiodifusión S.A. – Channel 8 of Mar del Plata, Televisora Tucumana Color S.A. – Channel 8 of Tucumán, Telenueva S.A. – Channel 9 of Bahía Blanca, Cuyo Televisión S.A. – Channel 9 of Mendoza, Compañía de Radio y Televisión del Noroeste S.A. – Channel 11 of Salta, and Televisora Santafesina S.A. – Channel 13 of Santa Fe – with a 30% stake, and Editorial Atlántida, through Enfisur, with a 14% stake. The company's other shareholders were Avelino Porto, rector of the University of Belgrano and former Minister of Health of Argentina from 1991 to 1992, the Soldatti family, and Luis Zanón.

The bidding process for Channel 11 was won by Arte Radiotelevisivo Argentino (Artear), owned by Grupo Clarín. However, because it had also obtained the license for Channel 13, it had to choose between the two stations. Artear decided to retain Channel 13, and Channel 11 consequently went to Televisión Federal. Televisión Federal assumed operation of the license on January 15, 1990, and adopted the name Telefe on March 5 of the same year.

The newspaper Ámbito Financiero questioned both transactions, alleging that they were acts of corruption intended to benefit Grupo Clarín:

Lamentable!… Se trata de una adjudicación directa eliminando a los tres oferentes para dejar solo a Clarín… El ala política del gobierno, encerrada entre funcionarios inescrupulosos o inhábiles, termina arrojando cada acto de privatización, que tiene el apoyo de los sectores progresistas de la comunicación, en un círculo de inmoralidades, privilegios y violaciones de la ley.

— Ámbito Financiero, December 26, 1989.

In 1992, Televisión Federal and Raconti S.A. acquired Radio Continental, with the sale being approved by the national government in 1995.

In April 1998, it was announced that Televisoras Provinciales had sold its stake in Televisión Federal to Atlántida Comunicaciones and that seven of the ten companies that made up Televisoras Provinciales—Compañía de Radio y Televisión S.A., Dicor Difusión Córdoba S.A., Emisora Arenales de Radiodifusión S.A., Neuquén TV S.A., Rader S.A., Telenueva S.A., and Televisora Santafesina S.A.—had accepted Atlántida Comunicaciones' offer to acquire their respective licenses. The transaction involving the last of these companies was completed in September of that year, with all of the acquired stations becoming part of Grupo Telefe. The owners of Channels 7 in Jujuy, 8 in Tucumán, and 9 in Mendoza did not accept Atlántida's offer to acquire their licenses.

On November 30, 1999, Constancio Vigil, general director of Atlántida Comunicaciones, announced that the Telefónica Group, which held a 30% stake in the company, would acquire 100% of Telefe's shares, its eight television stations, and the Continental and FM Hit radio stations for approximately US$530 million.

At the same time, it was announced that Telefónica would acquire a 50% stake in Azul Televisión (formerly owned by Prime Television), which included Channel 9 and its three stations in the provinces. Both transactions were approved by the Secretariat for Competition Defense and Consumer Protection on April 19, 2000. Telefónica completed the acquisition of both television operations on May 19 of the same year.

In late March 2000, it was announced that Telefe's parent company, Atlántida Comunicaciones, had acquired Channel 8 in Tucumán.

On November 28, 2001, the Federal Broadcasting Committee ordered the Telefónica Group to sell, within 12 months, one of the television stations in Buenos Aires—either Channel 9 or Channel 11—and one of the stations in Mar del Plata—either Channel 8 or Channel 10. On July 4, 2002, Telefónica ultimately divested itself of Channels 9 and 10 by selling its stake in Azul Televisión to HFS Media, a company led by Daniel Hadad and Fernando Sokolowicz, while retaining Telefe's Channels 8 and 11.

On November 17, 2004, Telefónica announced the sale of the licenses of Radio Continental to Prisa Group for US$10.5 million.

On December 6, 2012, Telefe submitted its voluntary compliance plan to the Federal Authority for Audiovisual Communication Services (AFSCA) in order to comply with the Audiovisual Communication Services Law. The plan proposed selling Channel 7 in Neuquén and Channel 9 in Bahía Blanca.

The plan was approved on December 16, 2014, two years after its submission, leaving the two stations subject to sale.

On December 29, 2015, Decree 267/2015, published on January 4, 2016, amended several provisions of the law. Among the amendments was Article 45, which had established that a license holder could not reach more than 35% of the country's population through its free-to-air broadcasting services. Following the removal of the national coverage limit, Telefe was no longer required to sell the two stations and could retain its eight stations in the interior of the country.

On February 2, 2016, the Ente Nacional de Comunicaciones (ENACOM), which succeeded AFSCA, decided to archive all compliance plans, including Telefe's. As a result, Telefe was no longer required to sell any of its television stations.

On November 3, 2016, it was announced that the American company Viacom had reached an agreement to acquire Telefe and its television stations for US$345 million. The acquisition was completed on November 15.

ENACOM approved the transfer of Telefe and its licenses to Viacom on March 30, 2017.

On August 13, 2019, CBS Corporation and Viacom announced an agreement to merge their respective business operations, including Grupo Telefe, under the CBS corporate structure, which would subsequently be renamed ViacomCBS.

The merger was completed on December 4, 2019.

On February 16, 2022, ViacomCBS was renamed Paramount Global.

On October 23, 2025, Grupo Televisión Litoral, led by businessman Gustavo Scaglione and associated with José Luis Manzano, acquired 100% of Telefe from Paramount Skydance for approximately US$100 million, returning the network to Argentine ownership after 25 years under foreign control.

== Divisions ==
- Mi Telefe
- Telefe Studios
- Telefe Buenos Aires
- Telefe Interior
  - 3 television stations
- Telefe Internacional

== Stations ==
=== Owned stations ===
Province	License city	Station	Channel		Operated since
Province	License city	Station	Analog	Digital	Operated since
City of Buenos Aires		LS 84	11	34	1990
Córdoba	Córdoba	LV 85	8	29	1998
Santa Fe	Rosario	LT 84	5	38	1998 (Note: The station was owned by Compañía de Televisión del Atlántico S.A., a direct subsidiary of Atlántida Comunicaciones, from 1998 to 2004, when the company was absorbed by Televisión Federal. Nevertheless, during that period it was considered part of Grupo Telefe.)
Santa Fe	Santa Fe	LT 82	13	N/A	1998

=== Formerly operated stations ===
Province	License city	Station	Frequency	Period operated	Notes
Buenos Aires	Bahía Blanca	LU 80	9	1998–2023 (Note: The station was owned by Compañía de Televisión del Atlántico S.A., a direct subsidiary of Atlántida Comunicaciones, from 1998 to 2004, when the company was absorbed by Televisión Federal. Nevertheless, during that period it was considered part of Grupo Telefe.)	Station sold to Televisión Litoral and La Nueva Provincia.
Buenos Aires	Mar del Plata	LRI 438	94.1 MHz	2001–2004 (Note: The station was owned by Radio Estéreo S.A., a direct subsidiary of Enfisur. Nevertheless, it was considered part of Radio Continental.)	Station sold to Prisa Group.
Buenos Aires	Mar del Plata	LRI 486	8	1998–2022	Station sold to Neomedia.
City of Buenos Aires		LS4	590 kHz; 105.5 MHz	1992–2004	Station sold to Prisa Group.
Neuquén	Neuquén	LU 84	7	1998–2023	Station sold to Alpha Media.
Salta	Salta	LW 82	11	1998–2023 (Note: The station was owned by Compañía de Televisión del Noroeste S.A., a direct subsidiary of Atlántida Comunicaciones, from 1998 to 2004, when the company was absorbed by Televisión Federal. Nevertheless, during that period it was considered part of Grupo Telefe.)	Stations sold to Televisión Litoral. Currently operating independently.
Tucumán	San Miguel de Tucumán	LRK 458	8	1998–2023 (Note: The station was owned by Televisora Tucumana Color S.A., a direct subsidiary of Atlántida Comunicaciones, from 2000 to 2004, when the company was absorbed by Televisión Federal. Nevertheless, during that period it was considered part of Grupo Telefe.)	Stations sold to Televisión Litoral. Currently operating independently.
