= 13 Max Televisión =

LT 80 TV Canal 13
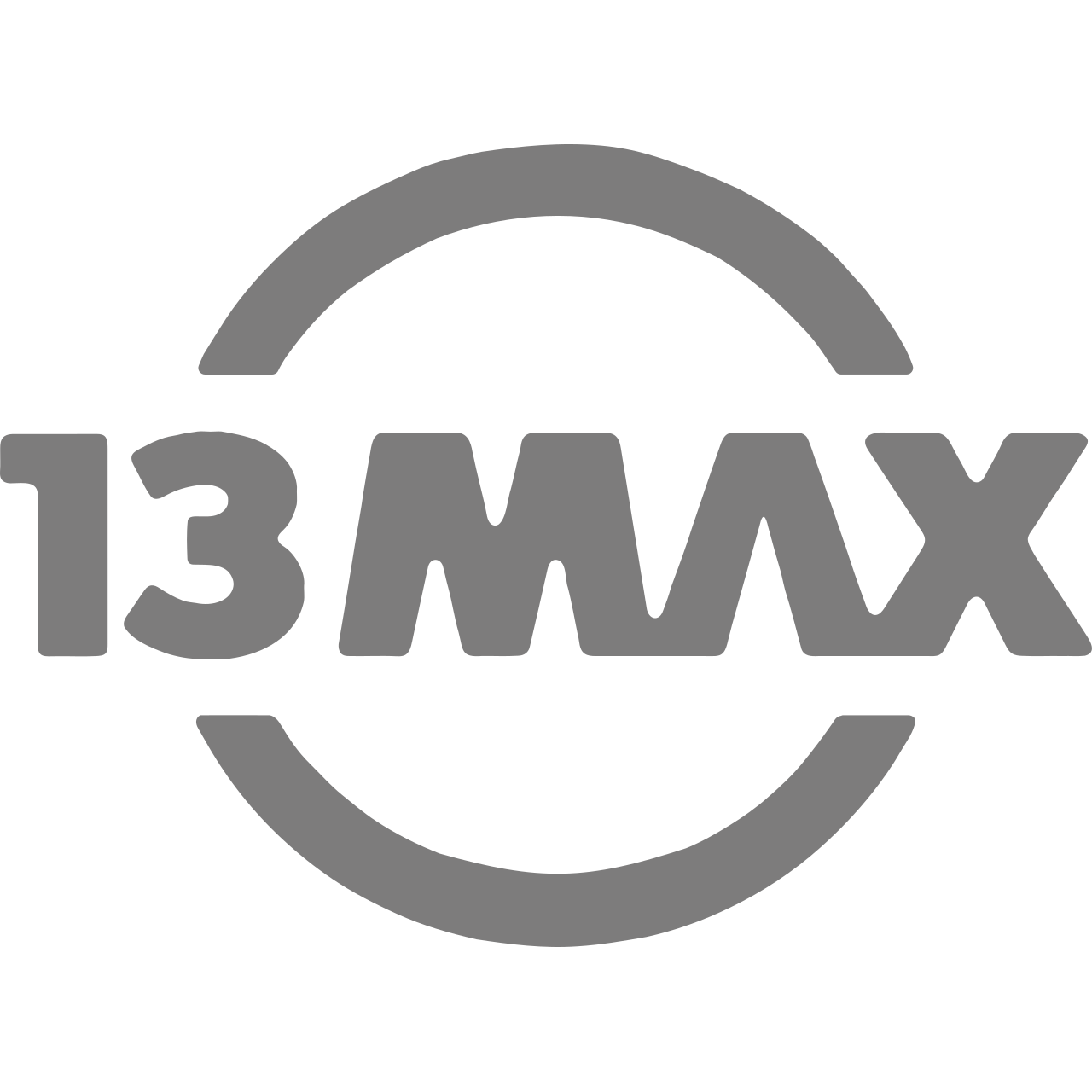
- Corrientes; Argentina
- City: Corrientes
- Channels: Analog: 13 (VHF); Digital: 32 (UHF)
- Branding: 13 Max Televisión

Programming
- Affiliations: Telefe

Ownership
- Owner: Grupo Atlántida (Río Paraná TV SRL)

History
- First air date: June 30, 1965
- Former names: Canal 13 (1965–2007); 13 Max Televisión (2007–2012); 13 Max Digital (2012–2017)

Technical information
- Licensing authority: ENACOM

Links
- Website: www.13maxtv.com

Canal 13 de Corrientes, better commercially as formerly known under its trade name 13 Max Television or simply 13 Max is an Argentine television station which broadcasts from the city of Corrientes. The station is owned by Río Paraná TV SRL, which was bought by the Atlantida Group, with a potential audience of one million people, competing against Canal 9.

== History ==
=== Founding and early operations ===
On October 10, 1963, by means of Decree 9063, the National Executive Chamber granted Río Paraná TV S.R.L. a license to operate VHF channel 13 in Corrientes. The company had Jorge Félix Gómez and Carlos Antonio Smith as its shareholders.

The license started regular broadcasts on June 30, 1965, as LT 80 TV Canal 13 de Corrientes.

After winning the license, it started installing its facilities, which were placed in its current location. The arrival of the station to the location (close to the Tipoití plant), caused a name change, becoming "Barrio Canal 13", as well as the main street of the transmitting station, which also adopted its name, finally ending with the name defined as Calle Canal 13 n° 350.

With many difficulties, as well as a lot of effort, the channel began to take shape little by little. Among the present difficulties, the lack of production of components, as well as the non-existence of imports, led to the hiring of specialized personnel for this purpose.

This is how, thanks to the contribution of the company's partners, as well as the fundamental work of the engineers Saccone and Huller, it would be possible to develop a high-gain broadcast antenna, which would have unique characteristics in the region.

With all these tools, the first Canal 13 broadcasts began in the city. However, the limited diffusion that television had in the city made this means of communication a privilege for a few, which would lead Smith and Gómez to set up a business selling televisions, to equip the homes of the city with this new way of communicating.

This way, a new phase in the life of Corrientes began, as well as in the Northeastern region.

=== Broadcasts ===
Initially, Canal 13 began broadcasting national programming, although it was also characterized by the promotion of local and regional production. Part of its programming was and is made up of purely local production programs, with content of interest to the province and the region. National programming was obtained from the purchase of pre-recorded material from the firm Proartel, a Buenos Aires company that managed programming for the entire country and, in turn, exploited the national license of Canal 13 de Buenos Aires.

Likewise, one of the first local productions presented by Canal 13 was a cultural series called "El patio de don Tunque", which reflected the daily activities of Corrientes, with folkloric and chamamecero numbers. In turn, an icon of Canal 13's local programming was its own newscast, which would acquire prominence within society, due to its coverage of current events in the city, recording historical moments such as the construction and subsequent inauguration of the General Belgrano Bridge between 1969 and 1973, or the arrival to the city of Pope John Paul II, in 1987.

The technological update was also part of the evolution of Channel 13, since in 1978 and along with the national signals, the first color broadcasts began, for which the total renovation of the equipment was necessary.

In this way and as in the experience of the inauguration of the signal, its owners would once again be in charge of providing televisions to homes, in order to arrive with the updated signal. At that time, a new problem would also arise, due to the difficulties arising from the constant changes of ownership in the provision of national programming.

=== Renewals and affilitations ===
On November 12, 1982, by means of Decree 1207, the National Executive Chamber renewed its license.

On October 27, 1983, by means of Decree 2775, «Río Paraná TV S.R.L. (licensee of Canal 13) authorized the arrival of María Antonieta Gómez, Jorge Félix Gómez and Félix María Gómez.

For this reason, at the beginning of the '90s, Channel 13 would sign a contract with Telefe, for the partial relaying of its programming, this being transmitted partly live and partly on a delayed basis. Currently, Channel 13's programming continues to present purely local content, added to the relays of the Buenos Aires network.

On July 5, 1999, by means of Decree 711, the National Executive Chamber authorized Río Paraná TV S.R.L. the entrance of María Antonieta Danuzzo Desimoni.

Just as the renewal reached the station, the name of the station was not immune to it either, since in 2008 and after being known since its inauguration simply as Canal 13, Río Paraná TV S.R.L. decides to change the commercial name of the station, becoming called 13 Max Televisión.

=== Technological development and name change ===
The constant changes in audiovisual technology also led the channel to constantly renew its technology.

On November 18, 2010, AFSCA, through Resolution 329, authorized Canal 13 to conduct digital terrestrial television tests using the ISDB-T format, on physical channel 32.

On November 7, 2014, Canal 13 started broadcasting on TDA channel 32.1 in Corrientes.

On March 31, 2015, AFSCA, by means of Resolution 236, granted Canal 13 channel 31.1 to deliver its HD broadcasts.

Another innovation presented by the station, in order to adapt its signal to the national inclusive television regulations, is the implementation in its news program (named since 2008 as 13 Max Noticias) of the communication system for hearing-impaired people, using sign language.

On December 26, 2017, Channel 13 began broadcasting programming in HD.

== 13 MAX Noticias ==
The station's news service, with two editions: Encuentro Noticioso (as a morning newscast) Perfil Noticioso at 12:00 PM (as a midday newscast), 8:00 PM (as an evening newscast), and Hora de Noticias at 12:00 AM as a midnight newscast.

== Relayers ==
Canal 13 has three relay stations in Corrientes Province.

Corrientes Province
'Channel	Location
7	Bella Vista
13	Empedrado
12	Goya
