= Telefe Córdoba =

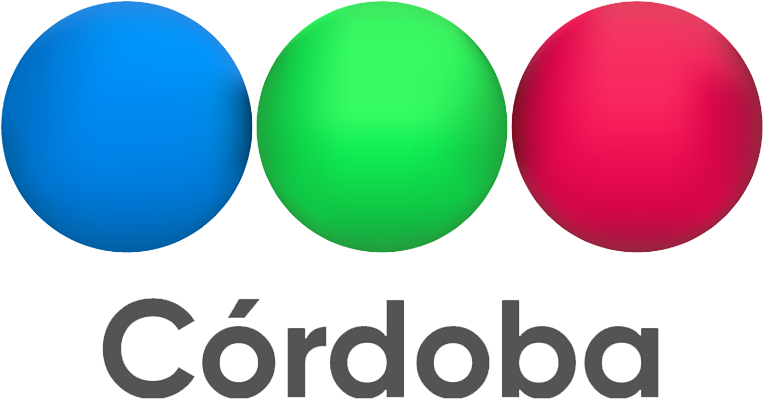
- Córdoba; Argentina
- City: Córdoba, Argentina
- Channels: Analog: 8 (VHF); Digital: 29 (UHF)
- Branding: Telefe Córdoba

Programming
- Affiliations: Telefe

Ownership
- Owner: Grupo Televisión Litoral; (Televisión Federal S.A.)

History
- First air date: April 5, 1971
- Former names: Canal 8 (1971–1991); Teleocho (1991–2018)
- Former affiliations: Independent (1971–1989)

Technical information
- Licensing authority: ENACOM

Links
- Website: cordoba.mitelefe.com

Telefe Córdoba (call sign LV 85 TV) is a Telefe-owned-and-operated station that broadcasts from the city of Córdoba, Argentina. The station reaches much of Córdoba Province through its network of relay stations.

== History ==
=== License and pre-Telefe years ===
On October 10, 1963, by means of Decree 9088, the National Executive Chamber granted Dicor Difusión Córdoba S.A. (at the time being formed and with 10 shareholders) a license to operate VHF channel 8 in the city of Córdoba, capital of the province of the same name.

On December 9, 1963, with the publishing of Decree 1335, the Executive Chamber rejected the granting to Dicor, noting "abuse of illegitimacy" for the license; however, in 1968, it had been revoked by the Argentine justice.

The license finally started its regular broadcasts on April 5, 1971, as LV 85 TV Canal 8 de Córdoba.

On July 15, 1983, through Decree 1760, the National Executive Chamber renewed the station's license.

=== As a Telefe O&O ===
On September 21, 1989, following the announcement made by Carlos Menem to privatize channels 11 and 13, one of the interested companies, Televisora Federal, was one of the contenders, which had Televisoras Provinciales S.A. (of which licensee Dicor Difusión Córdoba S.A. was a shareholder). When Telefe gained the license to operate channel 11 in Buenos Aires, Canal 8 Córdoba became a charter affiliate.

During the 1990s, Dicor Difusión Córdoba acquired most of the shares in Neuquén TV (licensee of Canal 7 Neuquén). On September 2, 1998, Dicor was authorized by means of a national decree to enter Neuquén TV's financial structure.

In April 1998, it was known that Televisoras Provinciales sold its shares in Televisión Federal to Atlántida Comunicaciones and that seven of the ten companies (among them Dicor Difusión Córdoba and Neuquén TV) accepted the offer presented by AtCo to stay with their respective licenses. (the transaction completed in September 1998, with all of the acquired stations, among them Canal 7 Neuquén and Canal 8 Córdoba, were now in the hands of Grupo Telefe). Dicor and Neuquén TV were absorbed in 1999 and 2000 respectively by Compañía Surera de Inversiones S.A. (absorbed by Televisión Federal in 2002). The transfer of the two licenses to Telefe were approved on March 30, 2017, almost 19 years later.

In February 1999, by means of Resolution 3456, Secretaría de Comunicaciones granted Canal 8 tests to broadcast on digital terrestrial television, under the ATSC standard, the one which was initially adopted in 1998. The station used VHF channel 7 as its first digital channel.

In August 2007, Canal 8 started using satellite relays (through the Hispasat 1C satellite), which was also used by the relayers to receive the station. Also, from that month, it started broadcasting in stereo and started using closed captions in some of its programs.

On August 30, 2011, AFSCA, by means of Resolution 1027, authorized Canal 8 to hold digital terrestrial television tests using the ISDB-T standard. For this end, it used physical channel 38.

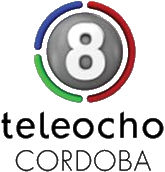
Logo used by Canal 8 between 2011 and 2018.

On August 4, 2014, Canal 8 started airing programming in HD en HD; the first edition of Telefe Noticias' local edition was the first to do so. A few days later on August 12, Canal 8 started its official DTT broadcasts (and in HD) through channel 29.2, becoming the first TV station in Córdoba to broadcast in this format.

On February 26, 2015, AFSCA, by means of Resolution 35, granted Teleocho channel 29.1 to broadcast regularly in HD on DTT.

=== Telefe Córdoba ===
On November 14, 2018, it became known that, from November 21, as part of a strategic change facing the analog shutdown, Telefe's O&Os outside Buenos Aires would replace their analog frequency-based channel names in favor of those of the Telefe network. As consequence of this change, Canal 8 took on the name Telefe Córdoba.

== Programming ==
Currently, part of the schedule consists of networked programming from Buenos Aires, where the head station is.

Local programming includes the local edition of Telefe Noticias, Misión Córdoba (tourism documentary), Protagonistas (news program, declared of Educational and Cultural Interest by the Ministry of Education of the Government of Córdoba Province), Por Deporte -XDXT- (sports program, on air since 1997), and Vení Mañana (morning magazine).

== Telefe Noticias ==
The local edition of Telefe Noticias launched on August 1, 1994 under the name Teleocho Noticias, although it was suspended between December 15, 2009, and April 12, 2010. It has three editions, at 1pm, 8pm and 12:30am, which are shown on weekdays.

October 17, 2011, Canal 8 launched Córdoba Directo, its morning news program. Its last edition was shown on July 27, 2018.

The news service was renamed Telefe Noticias on November 21, 2018, under the 2018 rebrand plan.

== Relayers ==
Canal 8 has 27 relayers across Córdoba Province. The relays receive the signal which is sent from the station's teleport and sent to the Hispasat 30W-5 satellite.

Córdoba Province
Channel	Location
33	Altos de Chipión
48	Arroyito
42	Bell Ville
28	Canals
13	Cerro Colorado
26	Corral de Bustos
6	Dean Funes
58	Del Campillo
39	Etruria
45	General Deheza
48	General Levalle
35	Jovita
29	La Francia
42	Las Varas
34	Laboulaye
27	Los Hornillos
48	Marcos Juárez
42	Morteros
36	Río Tercero
29	San Francisco
13	San Marcos Sierras
29	Tosno-Noroeste
7	Valle de Calamuchita
7	Valle de Punilla
47	Vicuña Mackenna
27	Villa Carlos Paz
18	Villa María
