= Channel 11 (Salta, Argentina) =

LW 82 TV Canal 11
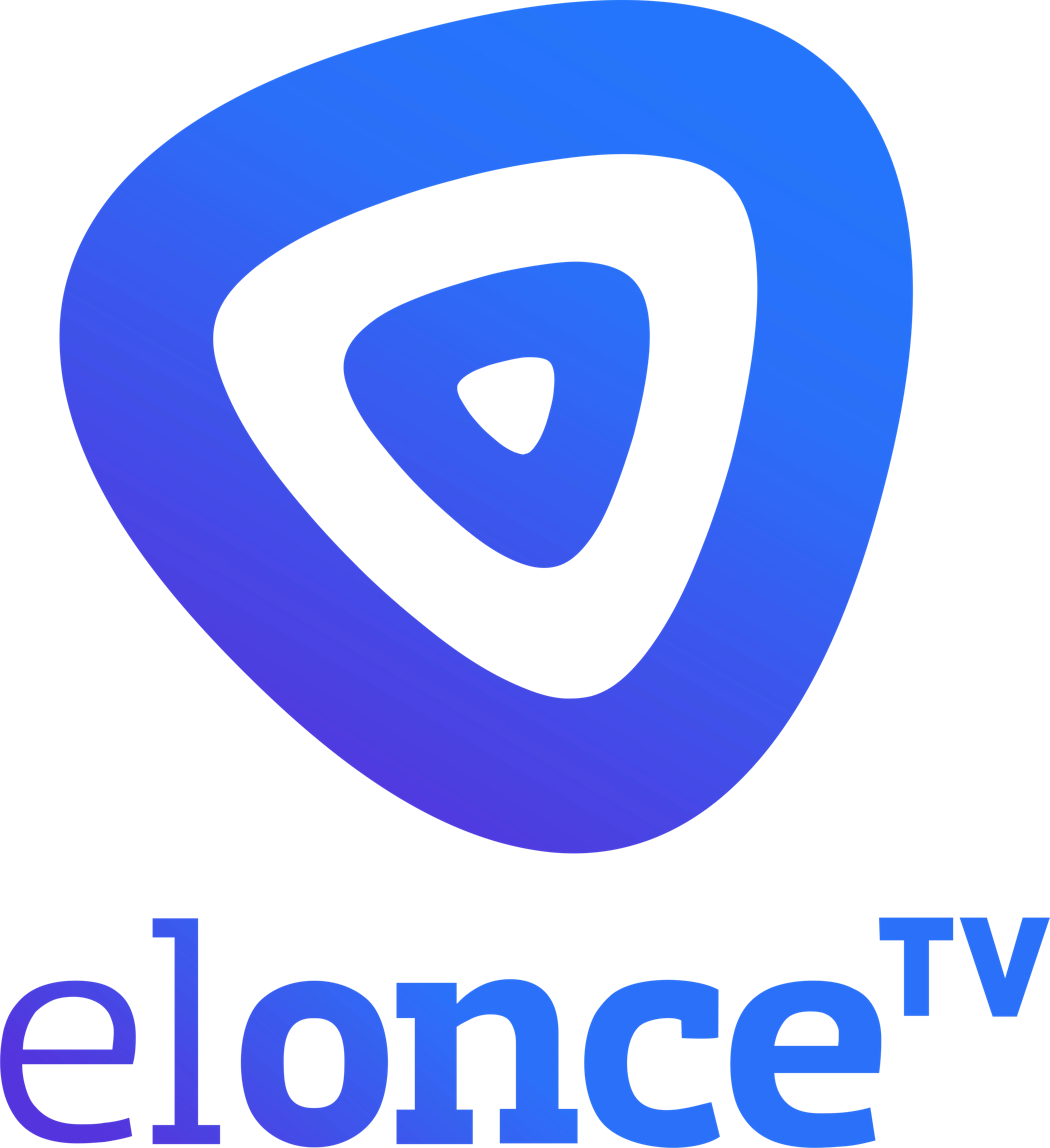
- Salta; Argentina
- City: Salta
- Channels: Analog: 11 (VHF)

Programming
- Affiliations: Telefe; Canal Siete Jujuy

Ownership
- Owner: Televisión Litoral, S.A.

History
- First air date: 1 April 1966
- Former names: Canal 11 (1966–2018); Telefe Salta (2018–2023)

Technical information
- Licensing authority: ENACOM
- Repeater: See list

Links
- Website: elonce.tv

Canal 11 Salta (call sign LW 82 TV), branded as elonceTV, is a television station broadcasting on channel 11 in Salta, Salta Province, Argentina. It carries programs from Telefe and the bingo games from Canal Siete Jujuy and is owned by Televisión Litoral. Notionce, is the news center information service of the northwest of the interior of the country with 4 editions from Monday to Friday, the morning edition, from 07:00 to 09:00, the afternoon edition, after Corta por Lozano, the Central Edition, at 20:00, The Night Edition, at 00:00, and on the Weekends, the Salta newscast of the air media of the northwest of Argentina of the media group of Gustavo El Pulpo Scaglione, Notionce en la Mañana (morning newscast on Saturdays), Notionce Primera Edición (noon newscast on Saturdays), Notionce Segunda Edición (central newscast on Saturdays), Notionce a la Medianoche (early morning newscast, only on Saturdays), Notionce Previo (Morning Newscast on Sundays), Notionce Edición Uno (Noon Newscast of Los Sundays), Notionce Evening Edition (Sunday Afternoon Newscast), Notionce Second Edition (Sunday Central Newscast). It serves the province of Salta.

== History ==
=== Early years and state intervention ===
On December 9, 1963, through Decree 1337, the National Executive Branch awarded Compañía de Radio y Televisión S.A. (at that time in the process of formation and made up of 15 people) a license to exploit the frequency of channel 11 in the city of Salta, capital of the province of the same name.

The license began its regular broadcasts on April 1, 1966, as LW 82 TV Canal 11 de Salta.

On August 31, 1973, through Decree 980, the National Executive Branch authorized the entry of 44 people into the Radio and Television Company (licensee of Channel 11).

On May 1, 1980, Channel 11 began broadcasting its programming in color. On December 1 of that same year, the channel's repeater was inaugurated in Rosario de la Frontera, while on March 1, 1981, the relay station located in Tartagal began its operation.

On January 14, 1983, through Decree 108, the National Executive Branch authorized the entry into the Radio and Television Company (licensee of Channel 11) of Alejandro Pablo Patrón Costas and Margarita Gómez Rincón de Lecuona de Prat; however the license that was granted was renewed.

On November 11, 1986, through Decree 2094 (published on February 16, 1987), the entry of Martín Patrón Costas, Héctor Cornejo D'Andrea and Horacio Patrón Costas into the company was authorized.

On February 11, 1988, through Decree 1248 (published on August 6, 1987), Gloria Eusebia Urrestarazu de Cabañillas was authorized to enter the company.

On June 22, 1989, through Decree 847, the entry of Fernando Lecuona de Prat into the company was authorized.

=== Privatization ===
In 1989, Televisión Federal S.A. won the license for the privatization of channel 11 in Buenos Aires; one of the shareholders, Televisoras Provinciales, was a consortium of interior television stations, including Emisora Arenales.

Atlántida Comunicaciones acquired Televisoras Provinciales's share in Telefe in April 1998, as well as seven of the network's 10 affiliated stations, including LW 82 TV; the purchase was consummated that September. Emisora Arenales de Radiodifusión itself was merged into Compañía de Televisión del Atlántico S.A. in 1999.

During this time, LW 82 TV also played a role in digital television testing. In February 1999, the Secretariat of Communications authorized testing of the ATSC digital television system—Argentina's original choice—by channel 11, using VHF channel 10, in October 1999.

=== The Telefónica years ===
On 30 November 1999, Spanish communications company Telefónica announced that it would purchase the 70 percent of Atlántida it did not own, including Telefe, seven affiliates, and radio station FM Hit, in a transaction valued at US$530 million. At the same time, it was announced that the same company would purchase 50 percent of Azul Televisión, another Buenos Aires station, and its three repeaters—including the other commercial television station in Mar del Plata, channel 10. On 19 April 2000, the Secretariat of the Defense of Competition and the Consumer, Argentina's antitrust regulator, approved both transactions, contingent on the sale of one of the two Mar del Plata television stations within 180 days.

However, this sale did not occur in a timely manner. In November 2001, COMFER ordered Telefónica to make up its mind and sell off one of its two stations in Mar del Plata and one of either Azul Televisión or Telefe within 12 months. Telefónica chose the higher-rated Telefe and its affiliate, channel 8, and sold off Azul Televisión and its affiliate, channel 10, to a consortium of Daniel Hadad and Fernando Sokolowicz.

In 2009, Argentina changed its choice of digital television system and selected ISDB-T instead. For this end, Canal 11 Salta selected UHF channel 39.

On June 4, 2015, AFSCA through Resolution 381, granted Canal 11 UHF channel 20.1 to broadcast its digital signal in high definition.

=== From channel 11 to Telefe Salta ===
On 3 November 2016, Viacom announced its acquisition of Telefe and its affiliate stations for US$345 million; the purchase was formally made on 15 November. ENACOM approved the purchase on 30 March 2017.

Telefe announced in November 2018 that, with the digital television transition in Argentina in the near future, it would switch all of its stations to branding by city name instead of channel number—in the case of the longtime "Canal 11", becoming Telefe Salta.

=== Sale to TVL ===
On September 29, 2023, it was confirmed that the channel was acquired by Grupo Televisión Litoral. As consequence, on September 30, 2023, scheduled for October 2, the channel was renamed elonceTV.

== Repeaters ==
elonceTV has four relayers in Salta Province.

Salta Province relayers
| Channel | Location |
|---|---|
| 6 | Cerro Cantera/San Ramón de la Nueva Orán |
| 12 | El Tunal |
| 9 | Pozo Verde/Rosario de la Frontera |
| 5 | Tartagal |
