= Channel 13 (Río Cuarto, Argentina) =

LV 86 TV Canal 13
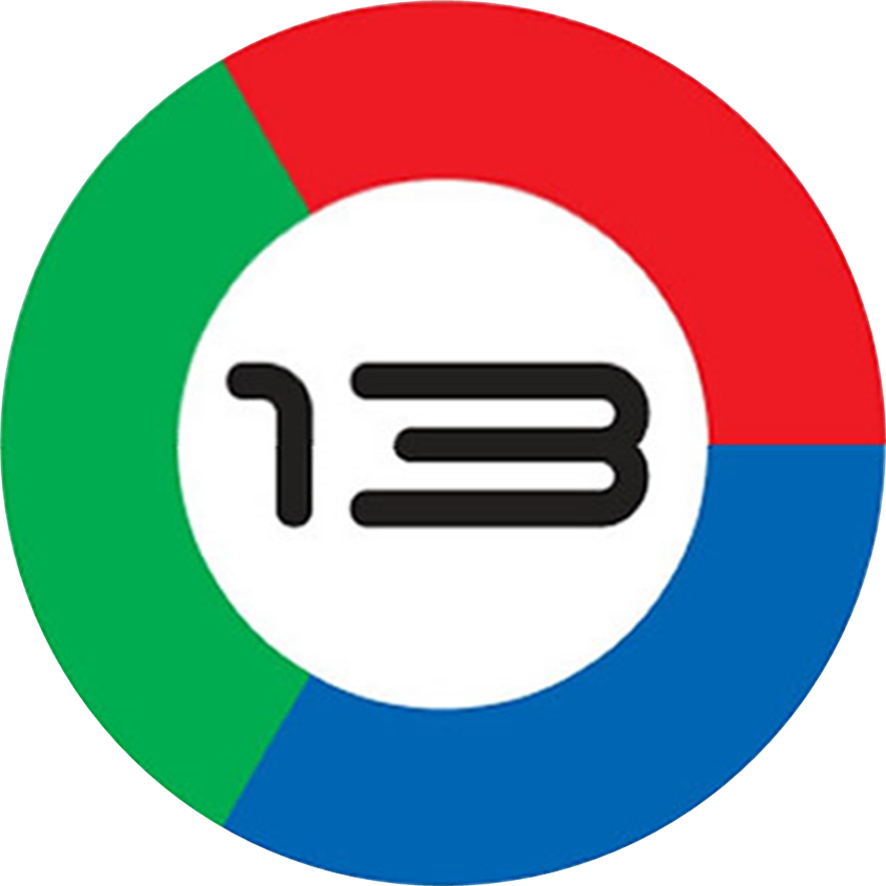

Río Cuarto, Córdoba; Argentina
- Channels: Analog: 13 (VHF); Digital: 29 (UHF)

Programming
- Affiliations: Telefe

Ownership
- Owner: Imperio Televisión, S.A.
- Sister stations: Telediario Televisión

History
- First air date: 15 August 1964
- Former names: Canal 2 (1964–1978)

Technical information
- Licensing authority: ENACOM
- Repeater: See list

Links
- Website: imperiotv.com.ar

Canal 13 Rio Cuarto (call sign LV 86 TV), also known as Imperio Televisión (name of the licensee), is an Argentine television station licensed to Río Cuarto, Córdoba Province. The station covers the south of the province and carries programs from Telefe.

== History ==
On 23 January 1964, by means of Municipal Resolution 5571, intendant Jaime Gil granted the 20 staff Imperio Televisión S.A. the corresponding authorization to install a cable network in the city of Río Cuarto.

The license began its regular broadcasts on 15 August 1964 as Canal 2 de Circuito Cerrado de Televisión, which was the first television channel that the city had in the premises of the former “El Americano” confectionery on the corner of Vélez Sarsfield and Alberdi, reaching 4,000 homes at that time.

40 employees worked to install the circuit and the transmission that began at 6:00 p.m. until 12:00 a.m.

The programming at that time was made with feature films, but the need to project the activity of the thriving city gave rise to local productions. Local programs from the early years included: Intermedio femenino, presented by Marisa Cerda; Río Cuarto nocturno, presented by Tito Rivie; Panel de la suerte, Acertijos musicales, Cabalgata and others.

In 1968, it joined the national microwave network and the use of celluloid was put aside to incorporate video tape; However, on August 9 of that year the first recording was made.

In 1973, the 20 founding partners decided to leave television activity and it was at that time that 18 employees formed a joint stock company continuing with the activity undertaken.

On 28 December 1977, the Federal Broadcasting Committee personally delivered, to the director of the company, a precarious authorization for the transmission of the World Cup, requiring a test signal to be available on 1 May 1978 with a primary omnidirectional coverage of 50 km.

In June 1978, it became an over-the-air station under the callsign LV 86 TV Canal 13 de Río Cuarto.The same businessmen founded the over-the-air station (as the successor of the closed circuit station on channel 2).

On 23 August 1979, by means of Decree 2063, the National Executive Branch authorized the Federal Broadcasting Committee to call for competition for the award and exploitation of the Channel 13 license.

On 1 May 1980, the station started broadcasting in color.

On 5 May 1981, by means of Resolution 269, the Federal Broadcasting Committee called for competition to award the station's license. On 8 March 1982, by means of Decree 481, the National State granted the license to Imperio Televisión. The company was made up of 6 partners, among them, Don Gabriel Yenaropoulos, Don Carlos Alfredo Dalmasso, Don Eladio Alfonso Pittaro and Don Roberto Américo Casali.

However, in that same year, new capital made the construction of the current building possible. In February 1983, the transmission plant equipment located from the corner of Venezuela and Laguna Blanca was moved to the property in front of the Mercado de Abasto.

On 17 January 1984, transmissions began from the current 50% enabled building.

In 1986, the Empire Television Closed Circuit signal was annexed to Channel 13, Open Television; We worked with this characteristic for the next 4 years.

In 1987, the firm changed ownership of the station.

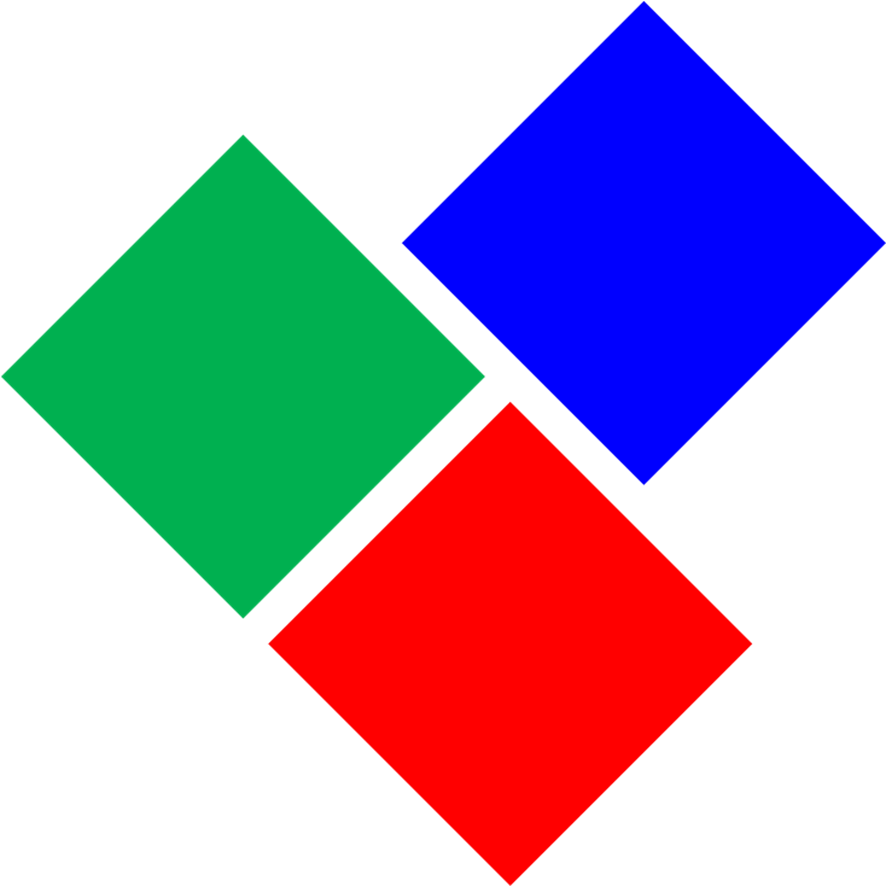
Logo used between 1994 and 1999.

On 30 March 2004, COMFER, by means of Resolution 384, authorized Imperio Televisión (owner of Canal 13) the installation of a relay station in Adelia Maria, on UHF channel 25.

On 27 December 2010, AFSCA, by means of Resolution 529, authorized Canal 13 to hold digital tests in the ISDB-T format on physical UHF channel 29.

In May 2014, Canal 13 started airing programming in HD.

On 29 September 2015, AFSCA, by means of Resolution 890, granted Canal 13 channel 29.1 to carry its over-the-air service in high definition.

On 23 October 2018, the station was added to DirecTV in Río Cuarto after four years of fighting in Argentine justice, but attached to the analog signal.

== Programming ==
Most of the programming seen is relayed from Telefe's network feed in Buenos Aires.

Local programming includes news service Telediario, Sabores con humor (cooking show), Tu compañero ideal (general interest), El acelerador TV (car program) Vivir mejor (cultural program) and Todo para vos (general interest).

== Canal 13 Noticias ==
Canal 13 Noticias has four editions, with local, national and international news. It airs on weekdays at 07:00, Noticias ITC, at 13:00, Sucesos Telex, at 20:00, Canal 13 Noticias and 00:00, Revista 13. Frequently, it is the most-watched program in the area. Also, from 12 September 2016, there is also Telediario Federal, a national sister outlet, aimed at decentralizing news sources for a national audience.

Originally, since the beginning of the channel, it was named Sucesos Teledos and until 1978, during the conversion to an OTA outlet, was known as Telex 13.

On 1 May 1980, during the arrival of color television, it was renamed Noticias ITC and in 1984, from its current facilities, it was renamed Telemundo.

On 18 August 1992, it adopted its current name, Telediario.

== Relayers ==
Canal 13 has 13 relay stations in the south of Córdoba Province; these relay the signal from the teleport and are sent using the ARSAT-2 satellite.

Córdoba Province
Channel	Location
N/A	Berrotarán
67	Canals
23	Corral de Bustos
6	Del Campillo
60	Etruria
69	General Deheza
10	General Levalle
43	Jovita
63	La Brianza
12	Laboulaye
N/A	Río de los Sauces
7	Suco
40	Vicuña Mackenna
