= Channel 8 (Mar del Plata, Argentina) =

TV station in Mar del Plata, Buenos Aires Province, Argentina

LRI 486 TV Canal 8
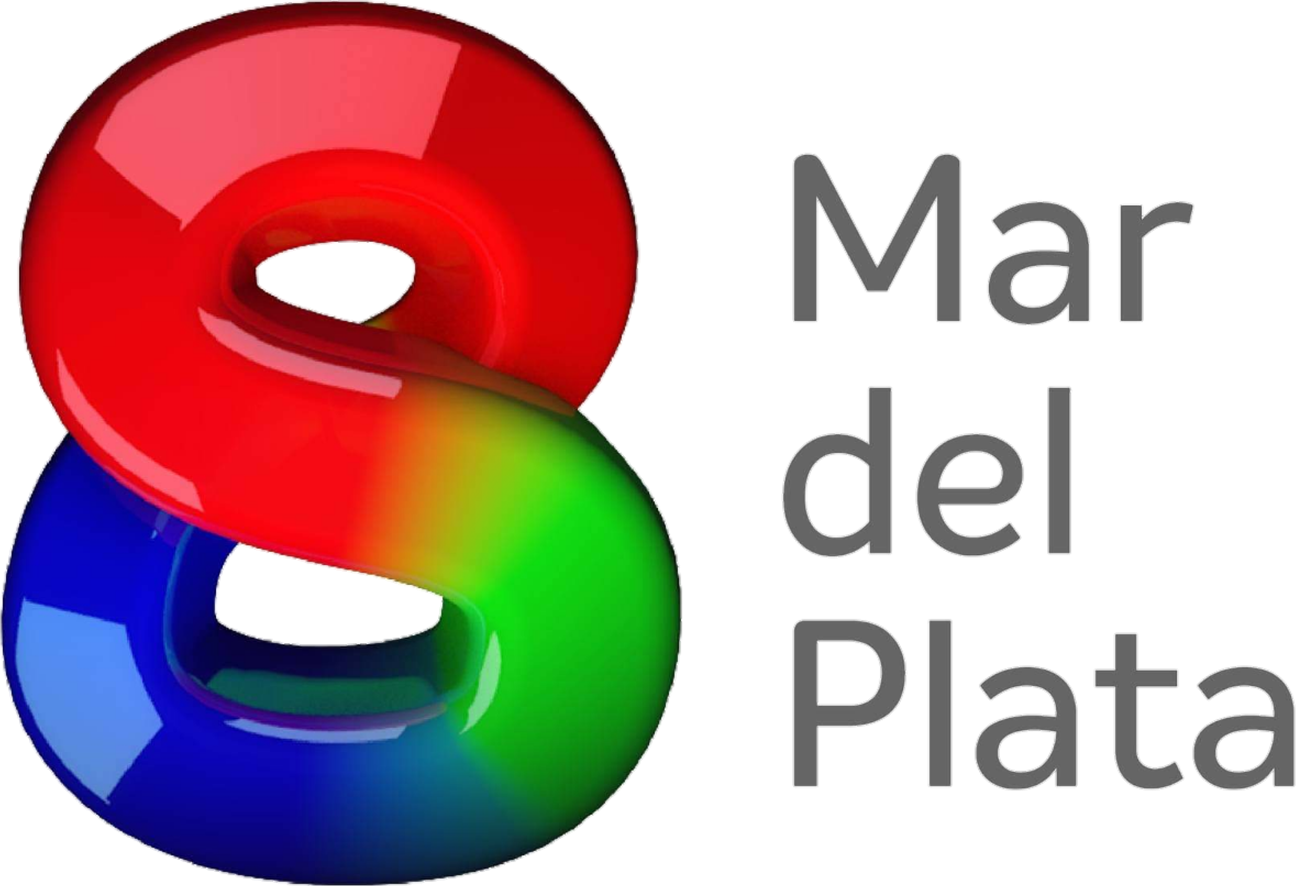
- Mar del Plata, Buenos Aires; Argentina
- Channels: Analog: 8 (VHF)

Programming
- Affiliations: Telefe

Ownership
- Owner: Neomedia de Gestion S.A.

History
- First air date: 18 December 1960
- Former call signs: LU 86 TV (1960–c. 1983)
- Former names: Telefe Mar del Plata (2018-2022)

Technical information
- Licensing authority: ENACOM
- Repeater: See list

Links
- Website: canal8mardelplata.com.ar

Canal 8 Mar del Plata (call sign LRI 486 TV) is a television station broadcasting on channel 8 in Mar del Plata, Buenos Aires Province, Argentina. It carries programs from Telefe and is owned by Grupo Neomedia.

== History ==
=== Early years and state intervention ===
On 28 April 1958, the federal government, by way of Decree-Law 6287, issued a license to Juan Llamazares, Alfredo López and Ildefonso Recade to build and operate a television station on channel 8 at Mar del Plata. It was one of the two first television stations awarded outside of the city of Buenos Aires, the other being channel 7 at Mendoza. The licensees formed a corporation with seven other investors, known as Difusora Marplatense, S.A., to manage the station, which signed on 18 December 1960, as the first in the city, under the call sign LU 86 TV. It was the second station in interior Argentina to begin broadcasting; channel 7 Mendoza was not on the air, but channel 12 at Córdoba was. The studios and original transmitter were located on Avenida Pedro Luro; the transmitter was moved to Sierra de los Padres two years later, improving coverage.

Channel 8 was nationalized on 8 October 1973, together with Buenos Aires channels 9, 11 and 13 and Mendoza's channel 7, when—days before Juan Perón returned to the presidency—the federal government under interim president Raúl Alberto Lastiri declared that their licenses would be deemed expired. State management took over at all five stations on 1 August 1974, after the prior owners sold the stations' related assets to the government.

=== Re-privatization ===
On 10 May 1983, the Federal Broadcasting Committee (COMFER), the then-regulator of radio and television in Argentina, issued a call for bids for the channel 8 license. Three companies presented bids: Difusora Video Sur, Emisora Arenales de Radiodifusión, and Radiodifusora Mar del Sur. On 28 October, the government selected the bid of Emisora Arenales de Radiodifusión for the channel; the winner took control two weeks later. By 1985, the call sign had been changed to the present LRI 486.

In 1989, Televisión Federal S.A. won the license for the privatization of channel 11 in Buenos Aires; one of the shareholders, Televisoras Provinciales, was a consortium of interior television stations, including Emisora Arenales.

Atlántida Comunicaciones acquired Televisoras Provinciales's share in Telefe in April 1998, as well as seven of the network's 10 affiliated stations, including LRI 486 TV; the purchase was consummated that September. Emisora Arenales de Radiodifusión itself was merged into Compañía de Televisión del Atlántico S.A. in 1999.

During this time, LRI 486 TV also played a role in digital television testing. In February 1999, the Secretariat of Communications authorized testing of the ATSC digital television system—Argentina's original choice—by channel 8, using VHF channel 9.

=== The Telefónica years ===
On 30 November 1999, Spanish communications company Telefónica announced that it would purchase the 70 percent of Atlántida it did not own, including Telefe, seven affiliates, and radio station FM Hit, in a transaction valued at US$530 million. At the same time, it was announced that the same company would purchase 50 percent of Azul Televisión, another Buenos Aires station, and its three repeaters—including the other commercial television station in Mar del Plata, channel 10. On 19 April 2000, the Secretariat of the Defense of Competition and the Consumer, Argentina's antitrust regulator, approved both transactions, contingent on the sale of one of the two Mar del Plata television stations within 180 days.

However, this sale did not occur in a timely manner. In November 2001, COMFER ordered Telefónica to make up its mind and sell off one of its two stations in Mar del Plata and one of either Azul Televisión or Telefe within 12 months. Telefónica chose the higher-rated Telefe and its affiliate, channel 8, and sold off Azul Televisión and its affiliate, channel 10, to a consortium of Daniel Hadad and Fernando Sokolowicz.

In 2009, Argentina changed its choice of digital television system and selected ISDB-T instead. On 30 August 2011, the Federal Authority for Audiovisual Communication Services (AFSCA), COMFER's replacement, authorized channel 8 Mar del Plata to begin ISDB-T test broadcasts on UHF channel 35. Four years later, in March 2015, AFSCA assigned channel 20 for the station's regular digital broadcasts.

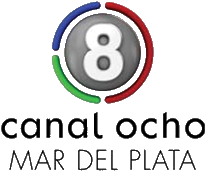
Logo used by Canal 8 between 2011 and 2018.

=== From channel 8 to Telefe Mar del Plata ===
On 3 November 2016, Viacom announced its acquisition of Telefe and its affiliate stations for US$345 million; the purchase was formally made on 15 November. ENACOM approved the purchase on 30 March 2017.

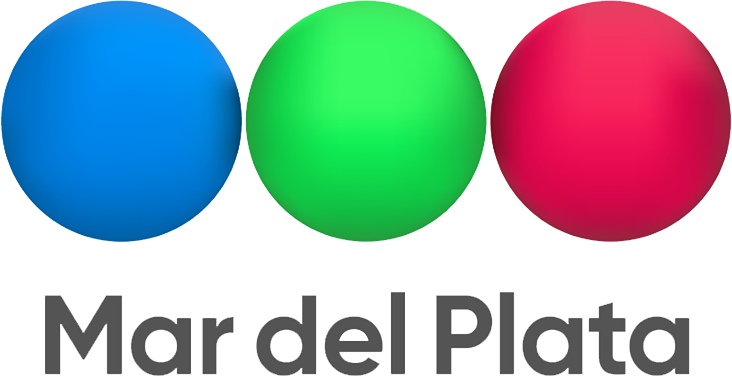
Logo used by Telefe Mar del Plata between 2018 and 2022.

Telefe announced in November 2018 that, with the digital television transition in Argentina in the near future, it would switch all of its stations to branding by city name instead of channel number—in the case of the longtime "Canal 8", becoming Telefe Mar del Plata.

Telefe Mar del Plata became the fourth Telefe regional station to begin high definition production on 3 June 2019.

=== Sale to Neomedia ===
On July 7, 2022, Neomedia de Gestión announced it would acquire Telefe Mar del Plata from Paramount, retaining the station as a Telefe affiliate and with Paramount serving as its national advertising representative and would become an affiliate of the Telefe channel, ending Telefe's ownership in the channel. Neomedia also owns, separately, Canal 10. The change was carried out the next day.

== Local programming ==
In addition to Telefe programs from Buenos Aires, Telefe Mar del Plata also originates some of its own programming, including its local newscasts, Teleocho Informa, Páginas Web de Noticiarias Visionables and the weekly news review Tiempo Zonal, El Postre del Repasador. Non-news productions include the sports program Goles de Medianoche ("Midnight Goals") and Video Pesca, a fishing program.

== Repeaters ==
Telefe Mar del Plata has 14 repeaters in the Province of Buenos Aires.

- Benito Juárez: Channel 9
- Carlos Casares: Channel 7
- Chivilcoy: Channel 3
- Daireaux: Channel 9
- General Guido: Channel 12
- Laprida: Channel 12
- Mar de Ajó: Channel 6
- Necochea: Channel 2
- Olavarría: Channel 45
- Pinamar: Channel 7
- San Carlos de Bolívar: Channel 13
- Tandil: Channel 13
- Tres Arroyos: Channel 7
