= Canal 9 Televida =

TV station in Las Heras, Mendoza, Argentina

LV 83 TV Canal 9
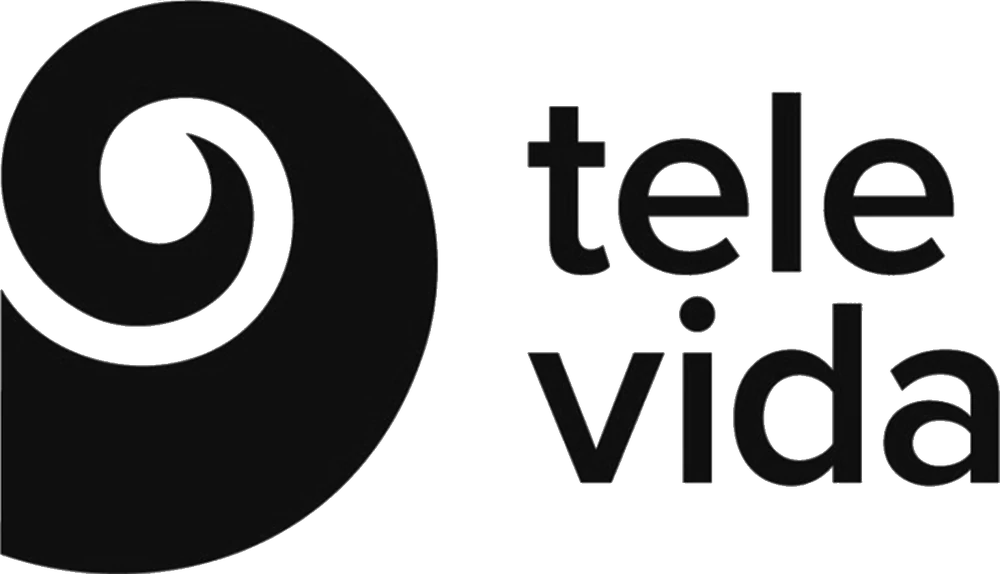
- Mendoza; Argentina
- City: Mendoza
- Channels: Analog: 9 (VHF); Digital: 33 (UHF)
- Branding: El Nueve Televida

Programming
- Affiliations: Telefe

Ownership
- Owner: Alonso Family (91%) Diario Los Andes (9%); (Cuyo Televisión, S.A.)

History
- First air date: 27 May 1965

Technical information
- Licensing authority: ENACOM
- Translator(s): 13 (Cerro Diamante); 5 (Valle de Uco); 6 (Villavicencio); 4 (Potrerillos); 13 (Usapallata); 12 (La Paz)

Links
- Website: www.elnueve.com

Canal 9 de Mendoza (call sign LV 83 TV), also known as El Nueve Televida, is a television station broadcasting from Mendoza, Argentina, province of Mendoza, Argentina. A Telefe affiliate, it is majority-owned by the Alonso family, with Diario Los Andes owning a minority stake.

== History ==
On 9 December 1963, by means of Decree 1337,the National Executive Chamber granted a license to Cuyo Televisión S.A. to operate on VHF channel 9 in Mendoza.

The license started its regular broadcasts on 27 May 1965 as LV 83 TV Canal 9 de Mendoza.

On 12 November 1982, by means of Decree 1205, the National Executive Branch authorized Cuyo Televisión (station licensee) the arrival of Laura Costoya de Sansi y Sigifredo Alonso; however, the license was renewed.

On 10 November 1986, COMFER, by means of Resolution 877, authorized Cuyo Televisión to install relays in Cerro La Horqueta and Cerro Bayo de la Esperanza, on VHF channels 5 and 9 respectively.

Canal 9 Televida was part-owned by Televisoras Provinciales, S.A., which was part-owner of what became the Telefe network upon the privatization of channel 11 in Buenos Aires.

On 5 June 1992, Diario Los Andes acquired 1,52% of the shares of Cuyo Televisión, which were formerly in the hands of Fernando Álvarez Herrero. On 29 July 1998, Los Andes increased its share to 9% after buying 7,48% of the capital which was held by Sigifredo Alfonso.

In April 1998, it became known that Televisoras Provinciales sold its shares from Televisión Federal to Atlántida Comunicaciones and that seven of the ten companies taking art accepted the offer presented by AtCo to remain with their respective licenses. The owners of Canal 9 Televida and two other stations (among them a future O&O, Canal 8 Tucumán, currently at the hands of Televisión Litoral) did not accept the acquisition offer made by Atlántida for its licenses.

In February 1999, by means of Resolution 3460, Secretaría de Comunicaciones authorized Canal 9 to conduct digital terrestrial tests on channel 13 in the ATSC format, Argentina's first choice. Subsequently on 1 June 2010, AFSCA, by means of Resolution 113, authorized Canal 9 Televida to conduct tests on the new ISDB-T format, using physical channel 33.

On 4 November 2013, Grupo Clarín presented its voluntary adequation plan with AFSCA to adequate to the media law, where, among others, proposed to sell its shares in the licensee of Canal 9 through Diario Los Andes. The plan was approved on 17 February 2014. On 11 July, Clarín's shareholders, at an Extraordinary General Assembly, approved the sale of the 9% they had in Cuyo Televisión to members of the Alonso family for AR$22 million. However, in October of that year, AFSCA reverted the approval of the voluntary adequation, and, as consequence, decided to go ahead with the adequation of work, due to supposed irregularities that were possible due to the fact that there were partners crossed between the assigners of certain licenses and units. On October 31, federal civil and commercial judge Horacio Alfonso dictated a precautionary measure which suspended the adequation; on December 10, the measure was granted for six months and in June 2015, it was renewed for another six.On 29 December 2015, by means of Decree 267/2015 (published on 4 January 2016), changes to several articles of the law were made (among them Article 45, which indicated that the licensee could not be a controller or participant in more than 10 over-the-air media licenses in the country); following the expansion of the number of authorized licenses that a company can hold to 15, Clarín no longer had the obligation to sell its shares on Canal 9 or any other license. Facing these changes, Grupo Clarín, in January 2016, decided to suspend its adequation plan. On 2 February, ENACOM (successor of AFSCA) decided to archive all of these plans (including Clarín's); as consequence of this, Grupo Clarín was no longer obliged to sell one of its licenses. As of June 2017, Diario Los Andes continues to be a shareholder.

On 26 February 2015, AFSCA, by means of Resolution 35, granted Canal 9 channel 28.1 to deliver its regular HD signal on digital terrestrial television.

On 23 October 2018, Canal 9, alongside El Siete, were added to DirecTV subscribers in Mendoza after years of fighting with Argentine justice.
