= Telefe Rosario =

Television station in Rosario, Argentina

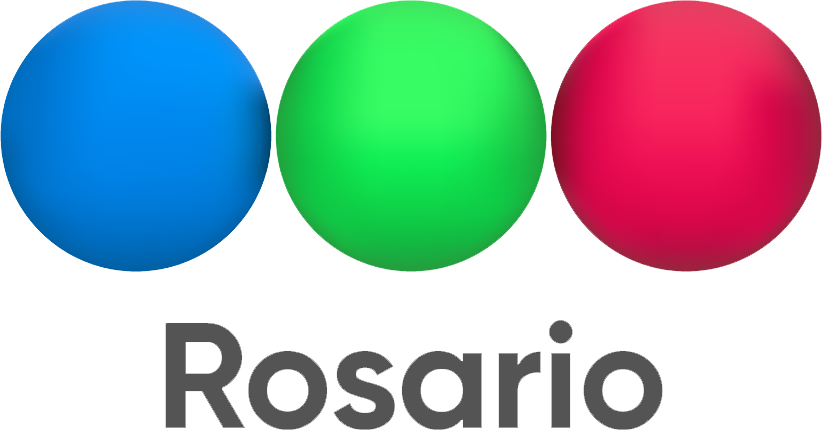

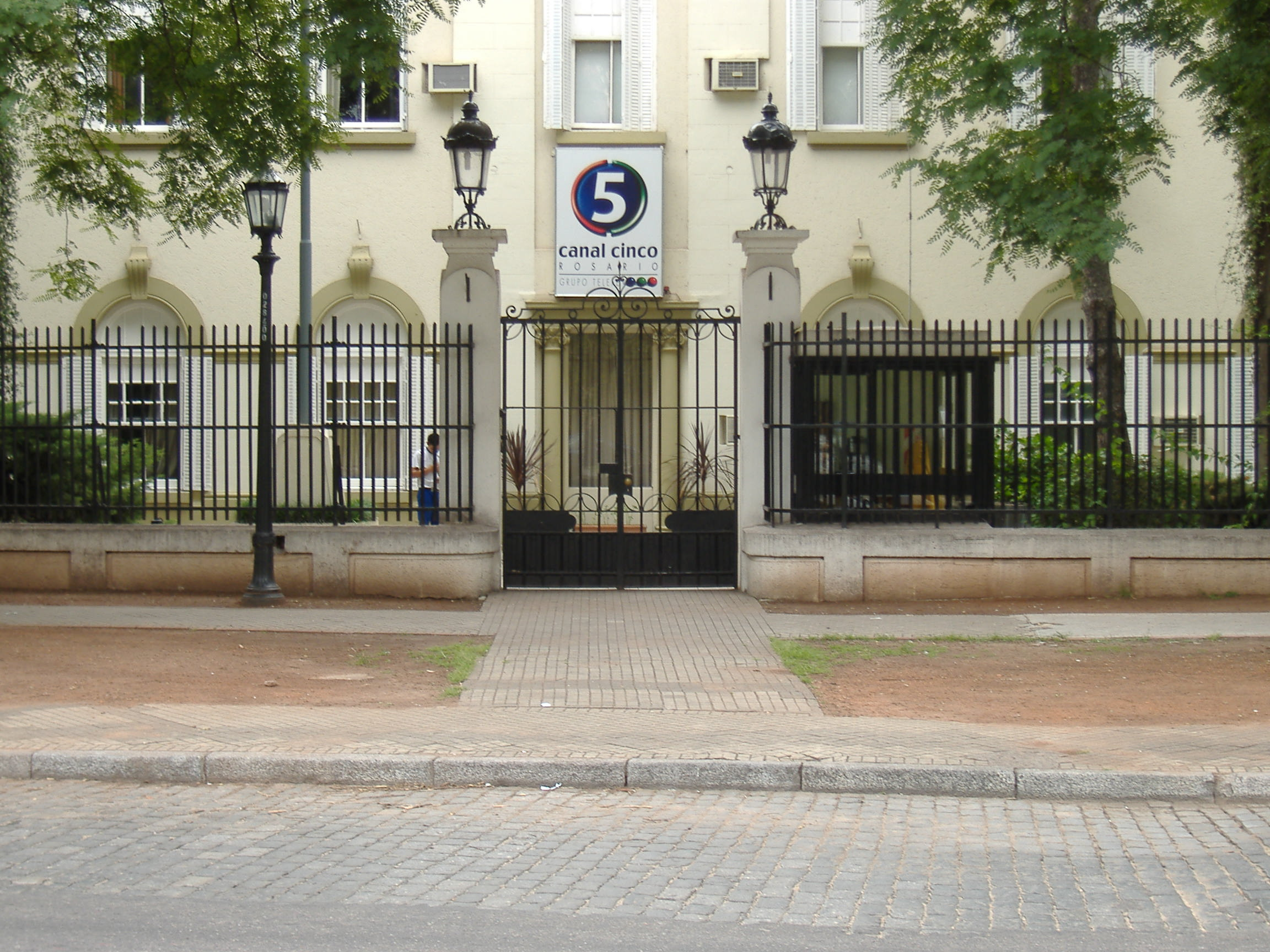
- Rosario, Santa Fe; Argentina
- Channels: Analog: 5 (VHF); Digital: 38 (UHF)
- Branding: Canal 5 Rosario

Programming
- Affiliations: Telefe

Ownership
- Owner: Grupo Television Litoral; (Televisión Federal S.A.)

History
- First air date: November 18, 1964
- Former names: Canal 5 (1964-2018)
- Former affiliations: Independent (1964-1989)

Technical information
- Licensing authority: ENACOM

Links
- Website: rosario.mitelefe.com

Canal 5 de Rosario (call sign LT 84 TV) is an Argentine television station carrying Telefe that broadcasts from the city of Rosario, province of Santa Fe, owned and operated by Grupo Televisión Litoral. The channel can be seen in Greater Rosario and in the north of the province of Buenos Aires.

== History ==
Channel 5 started its broadcasts on November 18, 1964. It was the first locally operated TV station in the city, after a repeater of public Canal 7 operating on channel 8 and seven months before LT 83 channel 3 came to air. In the beginning, the station had a small transmitter capable of broadcasting with just 200 watts. The first newscast of the station was Noticinco. Other early shows included Demos una Mano ("Let's Help") and Tertulia Hogareña ("Home Theater"). It also broadcast a wide array of children's shows, such as Capitán Kapote and Esperando a Papá ("Waiting for Daddy"), and American imports such as Bonanza, Combat! and The Fugitive.

In 1989, LT 84 became one of the founding members of Televisión Federal (Telefe), resulting in higher quality local programs.

In 2007, Canal Cinco's tower collapsed in a storm that also took down its competitor on channel 3: the next day, channel 5 was back and operating at 50% power. Three years later, both stations moved to the site already used by TV Pública to broadcast to Rosario.

== Programming ==
Canal Cinco offers a variety of local programs, such as local newscasts branded as Telefe Noticias, as well as locally produced programs with a regional focus, agricultural shows such as Tiempo de campo, and sports talk programs such as Fútbol sin trampas. Since 1994, the channel offers a daily mini-program called Rosario, Patrimonio de Todos ("Rosario, People's Heritage"). The show offers a retrospective to the city's history and its importance in the building of Argentina.

== Digital television ==
Canal Cinco was the first Telefe station in interior Argentina to broadcast in HD full-time, doing so on July 23, 2014. Test transmissions began in October 2012 with a local event, which aired both on broadcast in HD and on cable.

== Repeaters ==
- Channel 13 (Venado Tuerto)
- Channel 4 (Rufino)
- Channel 57 (Pergamino, Buenos Aires)
- Channel 68 (El Trébol)
