= Radio Continental =

News/talk radio station in Buenos Aires, Argentina

Radio Continental (LS4)
- Argentina
- Broadcast area: Buenos Aires
- Frequency: 590 kHz on AM

Programming
- Language: Spanish
- Format: News/Talk radio

Ownership
- Owner: Tronito

History
- First air date: September 28, 1969

Technical information
- Licensing authority: ENACOM

Links
- Website: www.continental.com.ar

LS4 Radio Continental is an Argentine News and Talk radio station. Radio Continental was founded on September 28, 1969 under the name Radio Porteña.

It is considered one of the most effective radio stations in Buenos Aires. It also has many affiliates throughout the country.

The station is owned by the audiovisual production company Tronito and operated by Grupo Octubre (owners of El Nueve).

== History ==
The station started its broadcast on September 28, 1969 on the frequency of 590 on the AM band replacing Radio Porteña, originally from its predecessor set up in 1933.

Television producer Televisión Federal S.A, originating in Buenos Aires, acquired the station in the latter years.

In January 2021, Argentine businessman Carlos Rosales, owner of Grupo Santamartah, acquired the station, along with LOS40, from its longtime owner, Grupo PRISA, to rent the ownership.

During 2024, the radio station experienced financial difficulties, resulting in delayed payroll payments to the workers, which led to repeated layoffs.

On February 5, 2025, it was confirmed that Carlos Rosales, along with LOS40 and Urbana Play, of which Continental owns the frequency, sold the radio to Gonzalo Arias, through his audiovisual production company Tronito, while Grupo Octubre (owners of El Nueve) will provide technical and logistical support. For this reason, the station moved its studios to Channel 9 headquarters on February 8, 2025, while Los40 will broadcast from AM 750 headquarters.

== Servicio Informativo Continental ==
The Servicio Informativo Continental (Continental Information Service), much better known as SIC, it is a three-minute news bulletin that comes out every hour including traffic and weather, along with a bulletin that is broadcast every hour and a half, where 4 news items are broadcast in a minute.

== See also ==
- Telefe, former Radio Continental's Television partner.
- LOS40, Radio Continental's sister station
