= Channel 9 (Resistencia, Argentina) =

LT 81 TV Canal 9
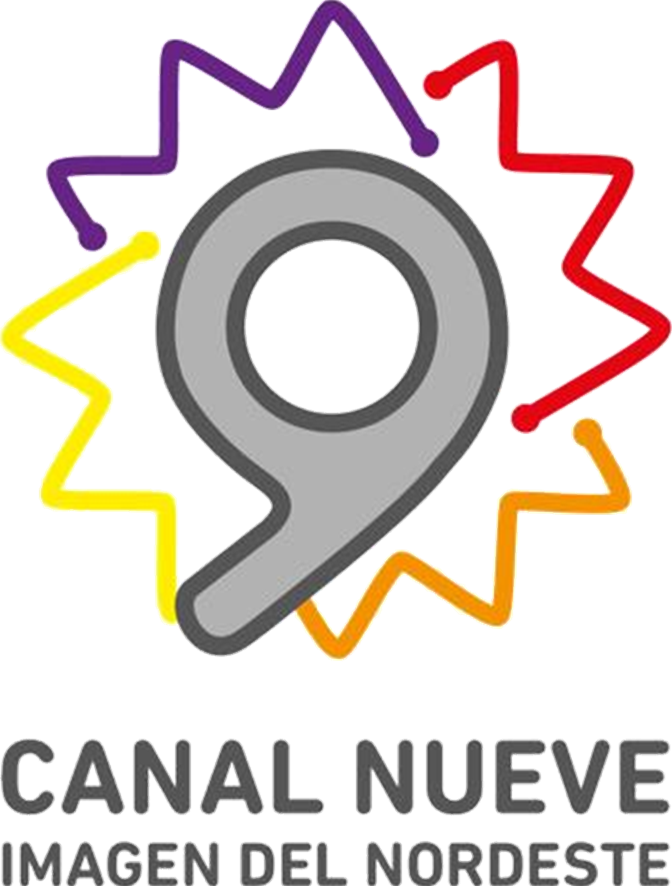

Resistencia, Chaco; Argentina
- Channels: Analog: 9 (VHF); Digital: 40 (UHF)
- Branding: Canal 9

Programming
- Affiliations: El Trece

Ownership
- Owner: Grupo Linke; (TV Resistencia S.A.I.F.)

History
- First air date: 17 August 1966
- Former names: Canal 9 Nordeste (1991-1995/2002-2003); Azul Televisión Nordeste (1999-2002)

Technical information
- Licensing authority: ENACOM

Links
- Website: canal9nordeste.com.ar

Canal 9 de Resistencia is an Argentine over-the-air television station affiliated with El Trece that broadcasts from the city of Resistencia, Chaco Province. The station is owned by Grupo Linke.

== History ==
On October 10, 1964, the contracting of companies that deal operationally with Decree 9065 had been put out to tender to the National Executive Branch with three possible names:Chaco TV S.A., which is the same that currently operates the second station of the prefecture, and Toba TV S.A., ultimately the license was granted to TV Resistencia S.A. (at the time in process of formation and with a staff of 15) to obtain a license to operate on VHF channel 9 in Resistencia.

The license started its regular broadcasts on August 17, 1966 AS LT 81 TV Canal 9 de Resistencia. Until October 2007, the station was a Canal 9 affiliate.

The first director of Channel 9 was Luis Viola (one of the owners and directors also of the defunct and historic newspaper “El Territorio”). At that time, the technical team was made up of about 8 people, headed by Emilio Couto.

On January 27, 1983, through Decree 194, the National Executive Branch renewed the license granted to Channel 9.

On May 24, 1983, by means of Resolution 273, COMFER authorized the municipality of Las Breñas to install a relay station there, on VHF channel 8. That same day, through Reoslution 274, it also authorized the municipality of General Pinedo to install another relay on channel 9.

On December 27, 1983, through Reoslution 619, the municipality of Santa Sylvina was given a construction permit for a relay station on UHF channel 31; however, on May 20, 2005 (through Resolution 576), Resolution 619/83 was revoked declaring the expiration of the construction permit.

In December 1985, LT 81's license was granted again to TV Resistencia S.A.I.F.

On November 25, 1997, Australian regional television company Prime Television Ltd. announced the acquisition of Canal 9 Libertad and its affiliates (including Canal 9 Resistencia) for approximately US$150 million. Said transaction was completed the following month. In January 1998, 50% of the network had been handed over to Torneos y Competencias; while, by March 1999, TyC co-owned such percentage with Atlántida Comunicaciones through AC Inversora.

On October 10, 1999, by means of Resolution 1640, Secretaría de Comunicaciones autorizó granted Canal 9 the permit to conduct digital test transmissions on VHF channel 8 in the ATSC format.

In 2002, it was acquired by Grupo Linke, its current owner.

On October 2, 2007, Canal 9 changed affiliations and became a Canal 13 affiliate.

On July 7, 2009, COMFER, through Resolution 435, authorized TV Resistencia (licensee of Canal 9) to install relay stations in Colonias Unidas (channel 12) and Pampa del Infierno (channel 13).

On October 20, 2011, AFSCA, by means of Resolution 1499, authorized Canal 9 to conduct digital signal tests again, this time on UHF channel 41 in the ISDB-T format.

The channel's reception in Chaco is thanks to the earlier relay stations, dating back to the 70s, which were located in the towns of La Escondida, Presidencia de la Plaza and Presidencia Roque Sáenz Peña. Then, Villa Ángela, General San Martín, Villa Berthet, Charata and Tres Isletas, and the last repeater station was inaugurated in the town of Juan José Castelli.

Within the framework of an auspicious and integrative project that sought full regional expansion, and with the help of the Linke Group, in May 2013 the secondary facilities of the station were inaugurated in the city of Corrientes; however these facilities closed in 2019.

On February 26, 2015, AFSCA, through Resolution 35, granted Canal 9 UHF channel 28 to broadcast its digital signals regularly. Since then, it became the only full HD station in the region.

== Programming ==
Currently, part of its schedule consists of relays from the El Trece network.

Local programming includes news operation Noticiero 9, Streamercitos (kids' show), Receta secreta (cooking show), Siempre con lo nuestro (music show), Sports NEA (sports program), Veteve (general interest progarm) and La otra mirada (weekend magazine) among others.

== Noticiero 9 ==
Noticiero 9 is its news service. Currently, it has three editions, only on weekdays (at 13:00, at 20:00 and at midnight).

== Repetidoras ==
Canal 9 has relay stations across Chaco Province. Of the 10 that are currently authorized, only nine are known to operate.

Chaco Province
Channel	Location
7	Charata
10	General San Martín
10	Juan José Castelli
12	La Escondida
7	Presidencia de la Plaza
4	Presidencia Roque Sáenz Peña
4	Santa Sylvina (out of service)
3	Tres Isletas
5	Villa Ángela
73	Villa Berthet
