= Channel 7 (Jujuy, Argentina) =

LW 80 TV Canal 7
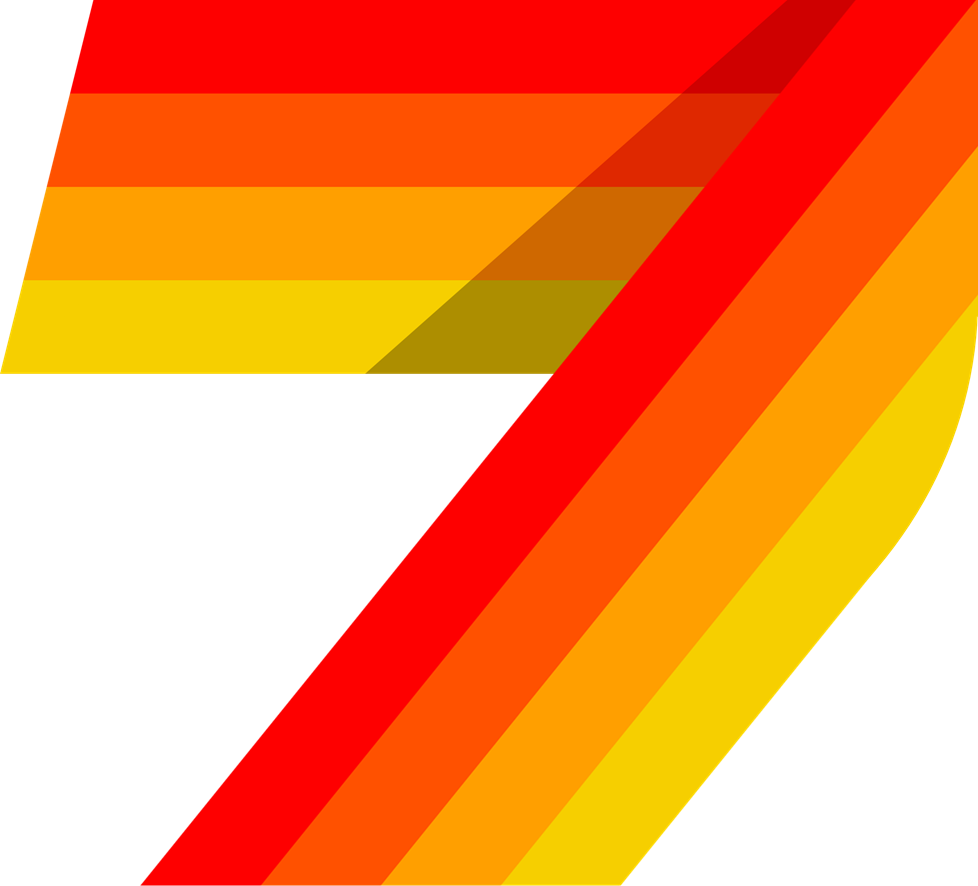
- Jujuy; Argentina
- City: San Salvador de Jujuy
- Channels: Analog: 7 (VHF); Digital: 36 (UHF)
- Branding: Canal Siete Jujuy

Programming
- Affiliations: Telefe

Ownership
- Owner: Radio Visión Jujuy S.A.

History
- First air date: April 30, 1966

Technical information
- Licensing authority: ENACOM

Links
- Website: www.canal7dejujuy.com.ar

Canal Siete Jujuy (call sign LW 80 TV) is a television station broadcasting from the city of San Salvador de Jujuy, Argentina, carrying programs from Telefe. It serves the province of Jujuy.

== History ==
On July 23, 1963, by means of Decree nº 6043, the National Executive Power granted a television license to Radio Visión Jujuy S.A. to operate on channel 7 in San Salvador de Jujuy, capital the province or the same name. The company had 12 shareholders, among them Leonardo Antonio García Petruzzi, Carlos Marcelo Quevedo Cornejo, Fernando Isidoro Pérez and Ernesto Félix Apud.

On October 31, 1963, the licensees founded the company for the exploitation of the television license.

The license started regular broadcasts on April 30, 1966 as LW 80 TV Canal 7 de San Salvador de Jujuy. Most of its audiovisual material was brought from Proartel, owner of Canal 13 de Buenos Aires and linked to CBS-TimeLife and Goar Mestre.

On March 30, 1970, Canal 7 installed its first relay station, above Zapla Mountain. On March 31, 1971, after verifying that the repeater facilities function correctly, the National Broadcasting and Television Authority authorized its regular operation. Later, in 1972, the station expanded its coverage to small towns in Salta Province.

On October 10, 1979, a contract was signed between Radio Visión Jujuy and the provincial government, by which the latter paid the station ARS$ 497,920,345 to reserve television spaces for campaigns for 3 years.

In 1980, Radio Visión Jujuy installed repeater antennas with contributions from the dictatorship to cover the Quebrada de Humahuaca and the Puna Jujeña to reach La Quiaca. On October 11 of that year, Channel 7 began broadcasting in color.

On December 1, 1982, through Decree 1375, the National Executive Branch renewed the license granted to Channel 7.

On July 27, 1983, through Decree 1890, Radio Visión Jujuy S.A. (licensee of Canal 7) of Susana Carrillo de Quevedo Cornejo was authorized to enter its directive.

On August 21, 1984, through Decree 2529, Cristina Raquel Marciani de Fernández was authorized to enter the company.

On October 18, 1984, through Law 4115, the provincial government declared the station "of provincial interest to the television and communication service in general for the entire province". Until 1986, Channel 7 was the only local station in the province, since closed circuits were not sufficiently developed in the area.

On October 31, 1985, through Decree 2127, the National Executive Branch authorized the entry of Radio Visión Jujuy S.A. (licensee of Channel 7) by Laura Eusebia Brizuela de Carrizo.

On September 21, 1989, president Carlos Menem ordered by decree the privatization of channels 11 and 13 of the city of Buenos Aires. One of the companies that participated in these tenders was the company Televisión Federal S.A. (Telefe), which at that time had Televisoras Provinciales S.A. as one of its main shareholders (of which Radio Visión Jujuy S.A., the licensee of Channel 7, was a shareholder).

The Canal 11 tender was won by the company Arte Radiotelevisivo Argentino (Artear), owned by Grupo Clarín. However, because he had also obtained the license from Channel 13, he had to opt for one of them and decided to stay with the latter and therefore, 11 ended up in the hands of Televisión Federal. The license became effective on January 15, 1990.

In 1996, Miguel Valdez Cánepa, responsible for Channel 7's programming grid for much of its history, retired from Radio Visión Jujuy and declared that there was no longer material to program since the station began to retransmit Telefe most of the time.

On January 26, 1998, through Decree 95, the National Executive Branch authorized the entry of Radio Visión Jujuy S.A. (licensee of Channel 7) by Eulalia Quevedo de Jenefes.
