= Telefe Santa Fe =

Television station in Santa Fe, Argentina

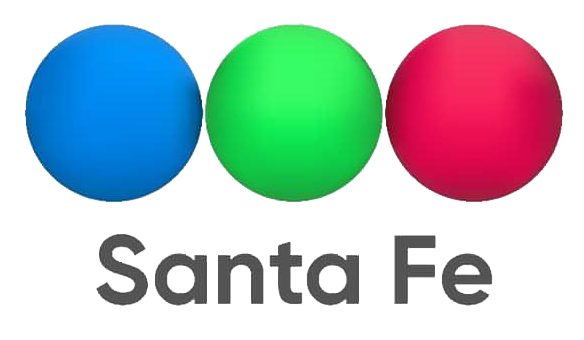
- Santa Fe; Argentina
- City: Santa Fe
- Channels: Analog: 13 (VHF)
- Branding: Telefe Santa Fe

Programming
- Affiliations: Telefe

Ownership
- Owner: Grupo Televisión Litoral; (Televisión Federal S.A.)

History
- First air date: March 13, 1966
- Former affiliations: Independent (1966-1989)

Technical information
- Licensing authority: ENACOM

Links
- Website: santafe.mitelefe.com

Telefe Santa Fe (call sign LT 82 TV) is an Argentine open television channel affiliated with Telefe that broadcasts from the city of Santa Fe, Argentina. The channel covers the center and northwest of the province of Santa Fe and part of the province of Entre Ríos. It is operated by Grupo Televisión Litoral through Telefe Group.

== Local programming ==
Former Channel 13's logo

- Notitrece - news
- Sembrando ("Seeding") - country news
- Martín Bustamante - country news
- Nuestra Casa ("Our Home") - DIY and cooking
- Otra Visión ("Another View") - health advice
- Pausa en Familia ("Family Break") - religious
