= Avelino Porto =

Argentinian educator and politician (1935–2024)

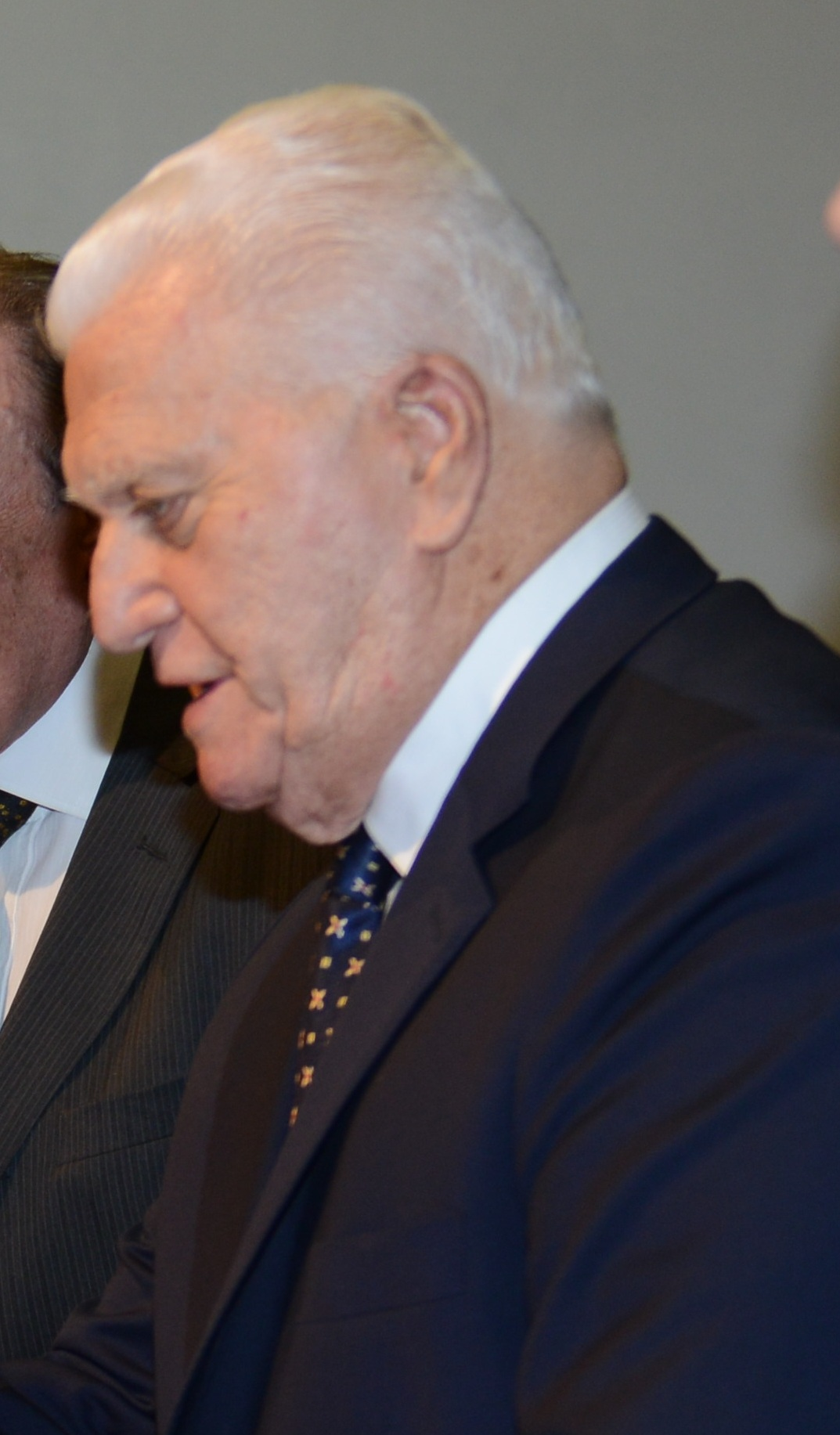
Porto in 2017

Avelino José Porto (5 November 1935 – 12 September 2024) was an Argentine lawyer and the founder of the University of Belgrano in Buenos Aires. Also, he served as Minister of Health during the presidency of Carlos Menem in 1991.

== Life and career ==
Porto attended to the Liceo General San Martín, a military high school of the Argentine Army. Later he earned a Law degree at the University of Buenos Aires in 1959. He started as a clerk in a criminal court.

In 1964 he founded the University of Belgrano, which is one of the oldest private universities in Argentina and since that time until 2021 he was the dean of the institution. After that he was related to organizations about education in South America and was a founder member of the Argentine National Academy of Education in 1984.

During the presidency of Carlos Menem he was designated Minister of Health and he served in charge between 16 January and 3 December 1991. In 1992 he was the candidate of the Justicialist Party representing Buenos Aires city, but he was defeated by Fernando de la Rúa.

Porto died on 12 September 2024, at the age of 88.
