= General Belgrano Bridge =

General Manuel Belgrano Bridge
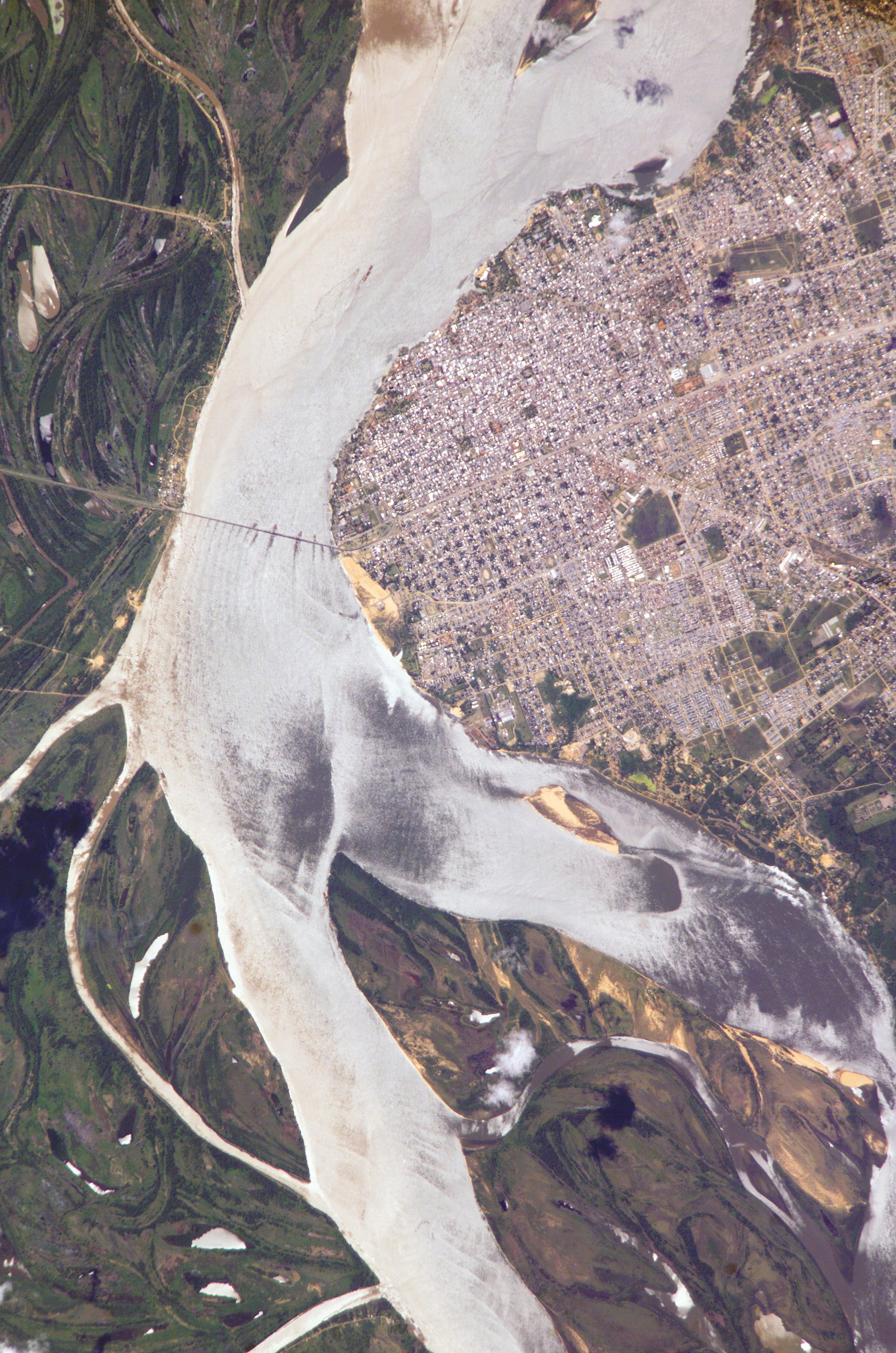
- Corrientes on the shore of the Paraná River, crossed by the General Belgrano Bridge (center-left).
- Coordinates: 27.470092°S 58.860208°W
- Carries: National Route 16
- Crosses: Paraná River
- Locale: Corrientes to Resistencia, Argentina
- Preceded by: Yacyretá Dam
- Followed by: Uranga-Begnis Tunnel

Characteristics
- Design: cable-stayed bridge
- Total length: 2,800 metres (9,200 ft)
- Width: 14.5 metres (48 ft)
- Height: 84 metres (276 ft)
- Longest span: 245 metres (804 ft)
- Clearance below: 35 metres (115 ft)

History
- Construction start: 1968
- Opened: May 10, 1973

The General Manuel Belgrano Bridge (Spanish: Puente General Manuel Belgrano) is a road bridge that joins the Argentine cities of Corrientes (capital of the Corrientes Province in the Mesopotamia) and Resistencia (capital of Chaco in the Chaco Region) over the course of the Paraná River (near the confluence with the Paraguay River). It was opened on May 10, 1973.

The bridge joins Corrientes' Provincial Route 12 with Chaco's Provincial Routes 11 and 16. The main part of the bridge measures 1,700 meters (5,600 ft) in length and stands at 35 meters (115 ft) over the river, with cable-stayed section with spans 163.5 m (536 ft) + 245 m (804 ft) + 163.5 m (536 ft). It has two A-shaped main towers that are 83 meters (272 ft) high. The road is 8.3 meters (27 ft) wide and has two lanes, plus two lateral pedestrian ways, each 1.8 meters (5.9 ft) wide.

In 1999 the province of Corrientes was in the midst of a popular uprising, with protestors asking for the resignation of the provincial government. On 1999-12-17 the traffic over the bridge was blocked by demonstrators. The Gendarmerie intervened to suppress the protest, and killed two people. As of 2006 the investigations about the responsibility for these killings are still in progress.
