= Channel 7 (Neuquén, Argentina) =

LU 84 TV Canal 7
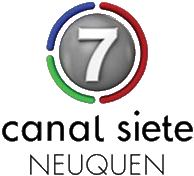

Neuquén; Argentina
- City: Neuquén
- Channels: Analog: 7 (VHF); Digital: 38 (UHF)
- Branding: Canal Siete Neuquén

Programming
- Affiliations: Telefe

Ownership
- Owner: Alpha Media S.A.

History
- First air date: May 12, 1965
- Former names: Canal 7 (1965-2001); Telefe Neuquén (2018-2023)

Technical information
- Licensing authority: ENACOM

Links
- Website: www.c7neuquen.com.ar

Canal 7 Neuquén, formerly known as Telefe Neuquén, is an Argentine television station which broadcasts from the city of Neuquén. The channel can also be seen in the Alto Valle del Río Negro region and in all of Neuquén Province through several relay stations. The station carries programs from Telefe and is operated by Alpha Media.

== History ==
On October 10, 1963, by means of Decree 9071, the National Executive Chamber granted Neuquén TV S.A. a license to operate a television station on channel 7 in Neuquén, capital of the province of the same name. The company was made up of 25 partners, among whom Alfredo Suárez, Osvaldo Pianciola, Rodolfo Riavitz and Víctor Eddi stood out.

Originally, Neuquén TV planned to begin broadcasting the channel on September 12, 1965, coinciding with the 61st anniversary of the founding of the capital of Neuquén; However, the channel's launch date was postponed to December. The license formally started broadcasting on December 5, 1965 as LU 84 TV Canal 7 de Neuquén.

Canal 7 was the first television station to sign on in the Comahue region and its studios were located on the side of Ruta Nacional 22, next to the monument to Ceferino Namuncurá.

On February 13, 1967, The Deliberative Council of the City of Neuquén authorized the sale of two hectares of Farm 138 (owned by the Municipality) for $2 million to Neuquén TV with the aim of building the new headquarters of the channel. These facilities (which are located in front of the Plaza de las Banderas and are the ones currently used by the channel) were inaugurated on February 1, 1969.
