= Telefe =

Argentine television network

- Logo used since 2018
- Country: Argentina
- Broadcast area: Argentina
- Affiliates: See list
- Headquarters: Av. Sir Alexander Fleming 1101, Martínez, Buenos Aires

Programming
- Language: Spanish
- Picture format: 1080i HDTV (downscaled to 576i for the SD feed)

Ownership
- Owner: Grupo Televisión Litoral
- Parent: Grupo Telefe
- Key people: Gustavo Scaglione (Grupo Televisión Litoral CEO); Federico Levrino (programming and artistic director)

History
- Founded: 15 January 1990 (company)
- Launched: 5 March 1990 (current branding)
- Replaced: Canal 11

Links
- Website: mitelefe.com

LS 84 TV Canal 11, Buenos Aires, Argentina
- Channels: Analog: 11 (VHF); Digital: 34 (UHF)

Programming
- Subchannels: See article

Ownership
- Owner: Grupo Televisión Litoral; (Televisión Federal S.A.)

History
- First air date: 21 July 1961
- Former names: Teleonce (1961-1974, 1976-1978); Oncevisión (1974-1976); Canal 11 (1976-1990)

Technical information
- ERP: 150 kW
- Transmitter coordinates: 34°35′57″S 58°22′13″W

Telefe (acronym for Televisión Federal) is a television station located in Buenos Aires, Argentina. The station is owned and operated by Grupo Televisión Litoral through Televisión Federal S.A. Telefe is also one of Argentina's six national television networks. Its studios are located in Martínez, Buenos Aires, adjacent to the corporate headquarters; its transmitter is located at the Alas Building.

In areas of Argentina where a Telefe station is not receivable over-the-air, it is available on satellite and select cable systems. Telefe also has regional stations across the country and an international network (Telefe Internacional) which is available in the Americas, Europe, Asia, and Oceania.

== History ==
=== First years (1957–73) ===
The history of Telefe stretches back to 1957, when a group of alumni and lawyers from the Colegio El Salvador led by Fr. Héctor Grandetti, founded the company Difusión Contemporánea S.A. (Contemporary Broadcasting S.A.). This company, known as DiCon for short, submitted a bid in the licensing of two new television channels in Buenos Aires, one on channel 11 and the other on channel 13. On April 28, 1958, DiCon won the license for channel 11.

Original plans to build the new station in the Colegio El Salvador facilities fell through. Eventually, facilities were secured, and Canal 11 launched from its first headquarters in San Cristóbal, Buenos Aires. The station finally launched on July 21, 1961, at 8:58 p.m. under Teleonce.

Financial problems forced the station to seek a backer, which would turn out to be ABC from the United States. ABC and DiCon formed Telerama S.R.L., a group that allowed DiCon to upgrade and expand its studio facilities.

During its first decade, Teleonce aired shows like Música en el Aire, Cosa Juzgada, Tato Siempre en Domingo, El Reporter Esso, Radiolandia en TV, Operación Ja Ja and No Toca Botón.

Through the 1960s, the family-oriented programming of the channel could not compete successfully against Canal 9 and did not have great financial backing like Canal 13. On October 17, 1970, businessman Héctor Ricardo García took over the station and changed the profile of the station, for an audience betting on news and more popular programming, adopting the slogan "El canal de las noticias" ("The News Channel"). Under García, Teleonce would climb to the top of the Argentine television ratings.

=== State-run era (1974–88) ===
After the licenses expired on October 8, 1973, changes began as the government took control of the news departments of channels 9, 11 and 13. Jorge Conti was named administrator and took over hosting duties for the newscast and other programs. This was followed on September 26, 1974, with the expropriation of the three networks making Conti the administrator again. This continued under the military dictatorship of the National Reorganization Process, with the Argentine Air Force co-administering the channel with Conti, who remained lead newsreader, and the channel was renamed as Canal Once.

In 1979, with the arrival of colour television looming and facilities upgrades needed to allow colour recording and broadcasting, the state bought the Canal Once plant from García, who had continued to own it, thus becoming a 100 percent nationally owned network.

The 1980s started with the introduction of colour telecasts on May 6, 1981, but the decade would become turbulent in the legal system. Twice under the dictatorship, a request for bids was issued. On August 19, 1982, the first one received no offers; the second, on October 25, 1983, would result in Canal Once being handed back to García. When Raúl Alfonsín became President of Argentina, among his first acts in office, was to nullify the transfer of Canal Once to García, leaving it in the hands of the state for another six years.

=== Privatization (1989–98) ===
As the 1980s began to close, financial problems and hyperinflation brought Canal Once to its breaking point. The energy crisis that helped bring down Alfonsín's presidency had forced massive cuts in broadcast hours in Buenos Aires; with the ability to broadcast only four, later eight, and ultimately ten, hours a day, and amidst the already rough economic backdrop, Canal Once teetered on the brink of bankruptcy. The closure of the station was being batted around at this time. However, salvation came when Carlos Menem announced that he would seek bids to privatize two of the state's three remaining Buenos Aires stations, Canal Once and Canal 13. One of the groups participating in this bidding process was Televisión Federal S.A., a group whose stakeholders were headlined by Editorial Atlántida as a group of privately owned television stations from across the country.

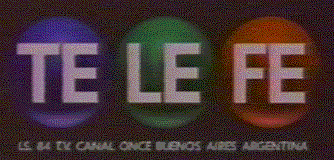
Telefe's arrival into the 1990s was signalled with the debut of its iconic RGB circles logo with the station name in white in them.

In December 1989, Arte Radiotelevisivo Argentino S.A. (Artear), a subsidiary of Grupo Clarín, won the bidding for Canal Once and Canal 13. Artear chose the latter, and Televisión Federal took control of Canal Once as principal owners effective January 15, 1990. After 16 years of state management, the station was back in the hands of the private sector, and after a decade of branding as Canal Once, the new branding of Telefe, an acronym of the new ownership's name, debuted on March 5 the same year. During the first weeks of the relaunched channel, the Telefe brand mirrored the blue and white of the Flag of Argentina (blue name on a white screen). That logo was later replaced by the three-circles logo used till the present.

In 1992, it started broadcasting the American animated series The Simpsons. Gustavo Yankelevich was aware of the news that "a yellow family" was a success on American television, but negotiations with 20th Century Fox Television were locked because it wanted to bring the series to Canal 13, whose director, Hugo Di Guiglielmo, didn't want. When Yankelevich was closer to obtaining the rights for the series in Argentina, he had to depend on a package of films from the company, which included the series.

=== Telefónica era (1999–2016) ===
In 1999, Telefónica acquired ownership of Telefe and its eight owned-and-operated stations; that same year, Telefe launched an international signal aimed at viewers outside of Argentina. It also retained Telefe over Azul Televisión when it bought the latter in 2002. The Federal Broadcasting Committee (COMFER in Spanish) later forced Telefónica to sell off its involvement in Azul Televisión.

With Gustavo Yankelevich (and after 1999, Claudio Villaruel) directing the channel's output, and with the introduction of satellite broadcasts nationwide, Telefe took to an unprecedented 20-year streak atop the Argentina ratings. It logged ratings wins in every year between 1990 and 2009, acquiring the rights to The Simpsons, Formula 1 racing and the franchise for Big Brother.

In 2010 and 2011, under the direction of Marisa Badía, Telefe lost its number one position in the ratings — which had not happened since just after the privatization of the station — to then-perennial runner-up El Trece. In 2012, however, another change in management, this time to Gustavo Yankelevich's son Tomás, and shows like Graduados, Dulce amor and Pekín Express helped Telefe return to the top of the rating list.

=== Viacom/Paramount era (2016–2025) ===
On November 3, 2016, it was reported that Viacom had won a bid to acquire Telefe. It also made Telefe a sister to Channel 5 in the United Kingdom.

In December 2019, Viacom re-merged with CBS Corporation, forming ViacomCBS (later known as Paramount Global) and making Telefe a sister to CBS in the United States, Channel 5 in the United Kingdom, and Network 10 in Australia.

Between 2022 and 2024, Paramount sold several of Telefe's owned and operated regional affiliate channels. In June 2025, it was reported in Argentina that Paramount had intentions to sell the network by the end of that year. Rumored candidates included Alpha Media, Marcos Galperín, Grupo Werthein and former Telefe artistic director Gustavo Yankelevich. Paramount Global remained owners of Telefe in August 2025, when it merged with Skydance Media to create Paramount Skydance Corporation.

=== Televisión Litoral era (2025–present) ===
On October 23, 2025, it was confirmed that Paramount Skydance Corporation sold the network to Gustavo Scaglione's Televisión Litoral S.A.

On April 6, 2026, a one-hour Disney Jr.-branded programming block launched on Telefe.

== Digital channels ==
The station's digital signal is multiplexed:

Channel	Video	Aspect	Programming
34.1	1080i	16:9	Main Telefe programming
34.31	240p	4:3	Main Telefe programming (mobile version)

== Current programming ==
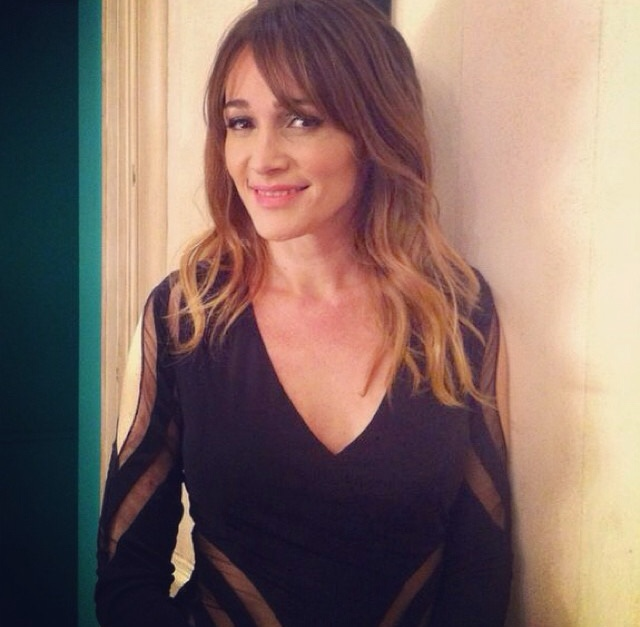
Verónica Lozano – host of the talk show Cortá por Lozano.

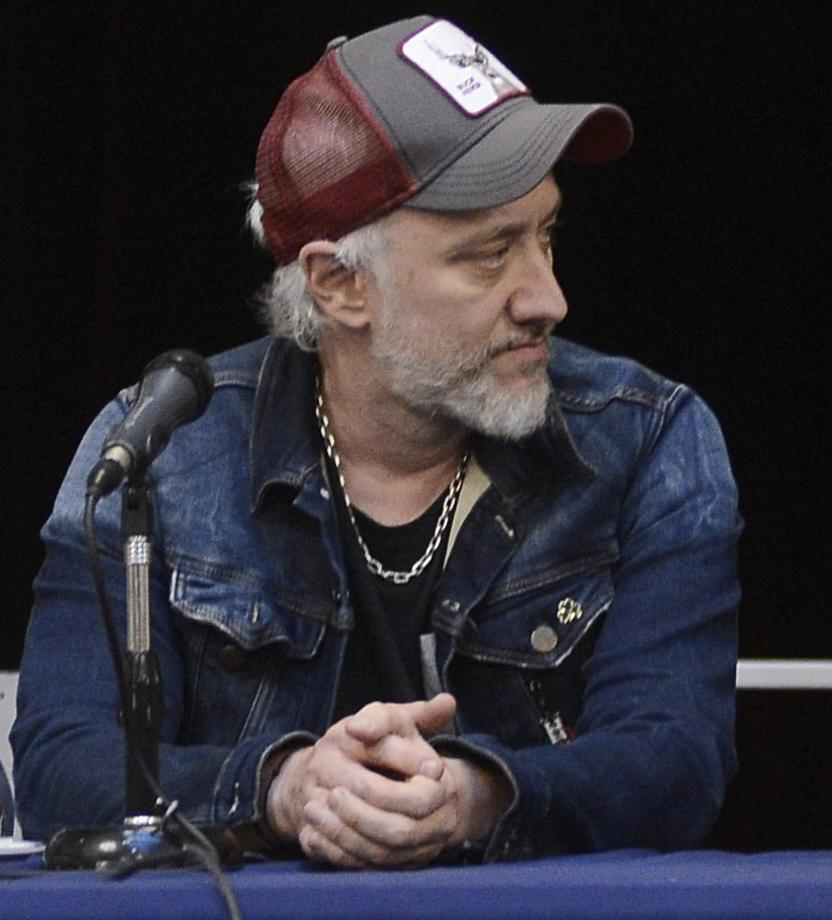
Andy Kusnetzoff – host of the talk show PH: Podemos Hablar.

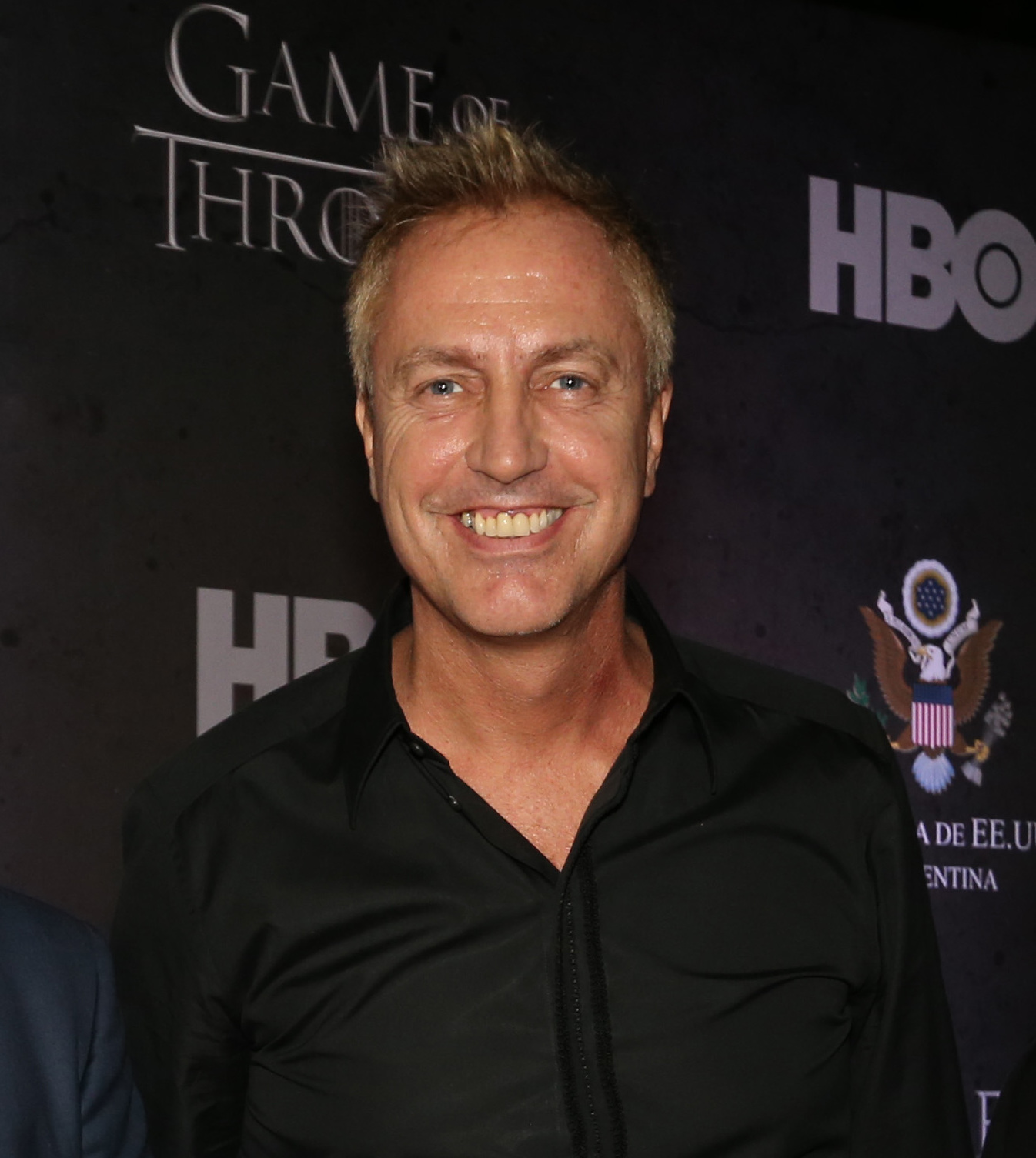
Alejandro Wiebe, also known as Marley – host of reality show Por el Mundo.

This is a list of programs currently being broadcast by Telefe, with their years of debut in brackets.

=== Original programming ===
==== Comedy ====
- Casados con Hijos (2005; reruns)

==== Talk shows ====
- A la Barbarossa (2022)
- Ariel en su Salsa (2022)
- Cortá por Lozano (2017)
- La Peña de Morfi (2017)
- PH: Podemos Hablar (2017)

==== Reality/non-scripted ====
- Gran Hermano (2001)
- Juego Chino (2022)
- Pasapalabra (2021)
- El último pasajero (2022)

==== News programming ====
- Buen Telefe (2017)
- El Noticiero de la Gente (2017)
- Staff (2017)
- Telefe Noticias (1990)
- #TT: Tiempo y Tránsito (2019)

=== Acquired programming ===
==== Drama ====
- Bir Zamanlar Çukurova (as Züleyha) (2021)
- Bizim Hikaye (as Amor de Familia) (2022)
- Génesis (2022)

==== Comedy ====
- The Simpsons (1991)
- El Chavo del Ocho (2024)
- El Chapulín Colorado (2024)

==== Children programming ====
All of the acquired children programming has been included under the Finde en Nick programming block since 2017 until 2025.

- Alvinnn!!! and the Chipmunks (2017)
- Blaze and the Monster Machines (2020)
- Dora and Friends: Into the City! (2017)
- The Loud House (2020)
- Paw Patrol (2017)
- Shimmer and Shine (2017)
- SpongeBob SquarePants (2020)

== Affiliates ==
The network currently has four owned-and-operated stations and current affiliation agreements with other television stations.

=== Owned and operated ===
All of the owned-and-operated stations (except LRK458 TV) joined Telefe in April 1998, after Editorial Atlántida acquired a majority stake of the former Televisoras Provinciales. LRK458 TV (later known as Telefe Tucumán and now known as Elocho TV) was the last to join Telefe in March 2000.

Province	City of license	Station	Branding	Channel					
Province	City of license	Station	Branding	Analog	Digital				
Province	City of license	Station	Branding	City of Buenos Aires	Buenos Aires	LS84 TV	Telefe	11	34
Córdoba	Córdoba	LV85 TV	Telefe Córdoba	8	29				
Santa Fe	Santa Fe	LT82 TV	Telefe Santa Fe	13	30				

=== Affiliates ===
Province	City of license	Station	Branding	Channel		Owner
Province	City of license	Station	Branding	Analog	Digital	Owner
Buenos Aires	Bahía Blanca	LU80 TV	El Nueve TV	9	—N/a	Grupo Televisión Litoral & La Nueva Provincia
Buenos Aires	Mar del Plata	LRI486 TV	Canal 8 Mar del Plata	8	—N/a	Neomedia de Gestion
Córdoba	Río Cuarto	LV86 TV	Canal 13/Canal 29 HD	13	29	Imperio Televisión S.A.
Corrientes	Corrientes	LT80 TV	13 Max	13	32	Jorge Félix Gómez & Carlos Antonio Smith
Neuquén	Neuquén	LU84 TV	Canal 7 Neuquén	7	38	Alpha Media
Jujuy	San Salvador de Jujuy	LW80 TV	Canal 7	7	36	Radio Visión Jujuy S.A.
Mendoza	Mendoza	LV83 TV	Canal 9 Televida	9	28	Cuyo Televisión S.A. & Los Andes
Misiones	Posadas		Canal 2	2	32	La Verdad S.R.L.
Salta	Salta	LW82 TV	El Once TV	11	—N/a	Grupo Televisión Litoral
San Juan	San Juan	LV 82 TV	Canal 8	8	31	Jorge Estornell, S.A.
Santiago del Estero	Santiago del Estero	LW81 TV	Canal 7	7	42	CAS TV S.A.
San Luis	San Luis	LV90 TV	San Luis +	13	28	Government of San Luis
Tucumán	San Miguel de Tucumán	LRK458 TV	El Ocho TV	8	20	Grupo Televisión Litoral

== Logos ==
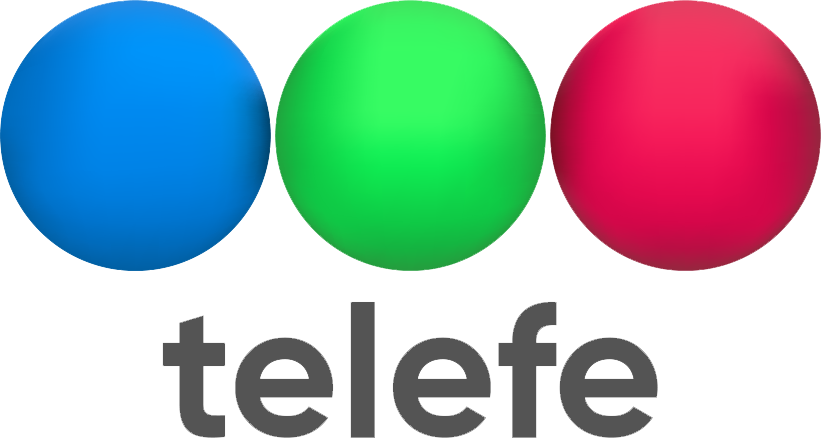
1990–2000	2018–present
