= Corral de Bustos =

Coordinates: 33°17′S 62°12′W

- Town
- Coat of arms

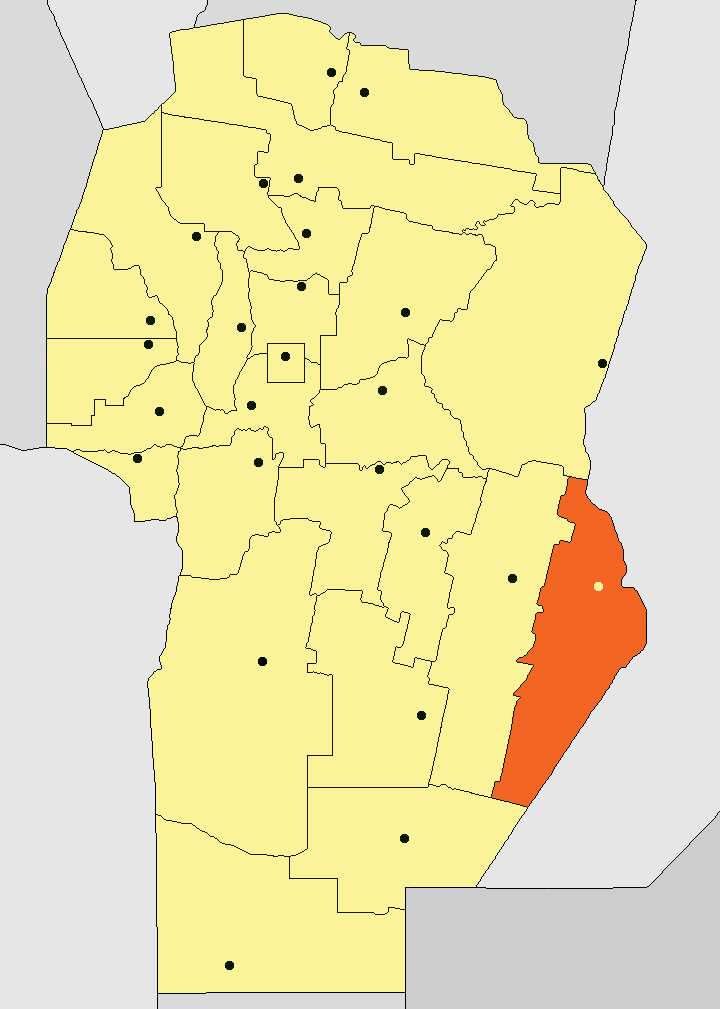
- Country: Argentina
- Founded: 14 November 1901
- Founder: Carlos Von Ifflinger

Government
  - Intendant: José María Odarda
- Elevation: 124 m (407 ft)

Population
  - Total: 12,000
- Demonym: Corralense
- Time zone: UTC−3 (ART)
- Postal code: X2645
- Area code: 03468

Corral de Bustos is a town in Argentina located in the district of Marcos Juárez, in the south east of the Province of Córdoba.

== History ==
The town of Corral de Bustos-Ifflinger was founded in the early Twentieth Century, when the German Carlos Von Ifflinger requested permission from the Government of the Province of Cordoba to establish a town that would carry on his surname. The government granted the permit on 14 November 1901 and this is now regarded as the founding date of the city, which originally only covered what is now Barrio Ifflinger.

In July 1902, a train service was inaugurated. The station was given the name Corral de Bustos, referring to an ancient Indian site located south of Chañar Ladeado. At that time, a railway official bought a field, now south of the tracks, where the railway company opened streets and began selling land. One of the first buildings constructed at that location currently houses the DGI, in the town centre. During the same period a school opened, the current Hipólito Yrigoyen, as did the post office, the police station, and the town hall.

By the 1930s, and the rise of Juan Perez Crespo to the local administration, the town began changing its appearance, on its way to becoming what it is today. In his first term as mayor, Crespo foreshortened the house fronts and built brick sidewalks. He constructed the gothic facade and tower of the church. In his second term as mayor, in 1942, Crespo inaugurated the substantial works that, 33 years later, were to elevate Corral de Bustos-Ifflinger to the status of a city. Major projects involved in the transformation included the abattoir, the market, and soon after, the first swimming pool, located in City Park. He also initiated the paving of the central streets in Corral, known at the time as the first town in southern Cordoba with paved streets.

Local industry began to flourish in the 1960s, with several factories exporting products to the European and Latin American markets.

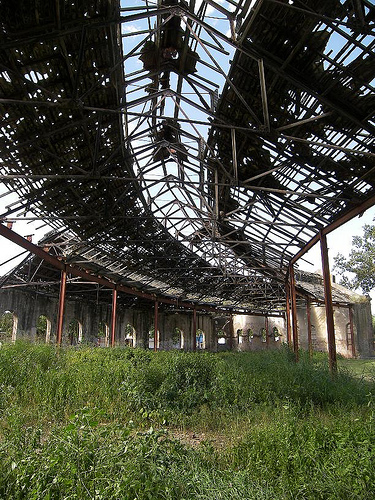
Abandoned train warehouse in Corral.

In the 1970s the construction of the Provincial Casino was brought to completion, accompanied by a series of carnivals and folkloric festivals, which established the town as a centre of nightlife for the region. The city became the centre of attraction for residents and overnight visitors to the region. The town continues to be a popular centre for nightlife with the people from surrounding regions flocking to the town on weekends to enjoy the Casino, the nightclubs (boliches) and the wide array of bars and nightclubs.

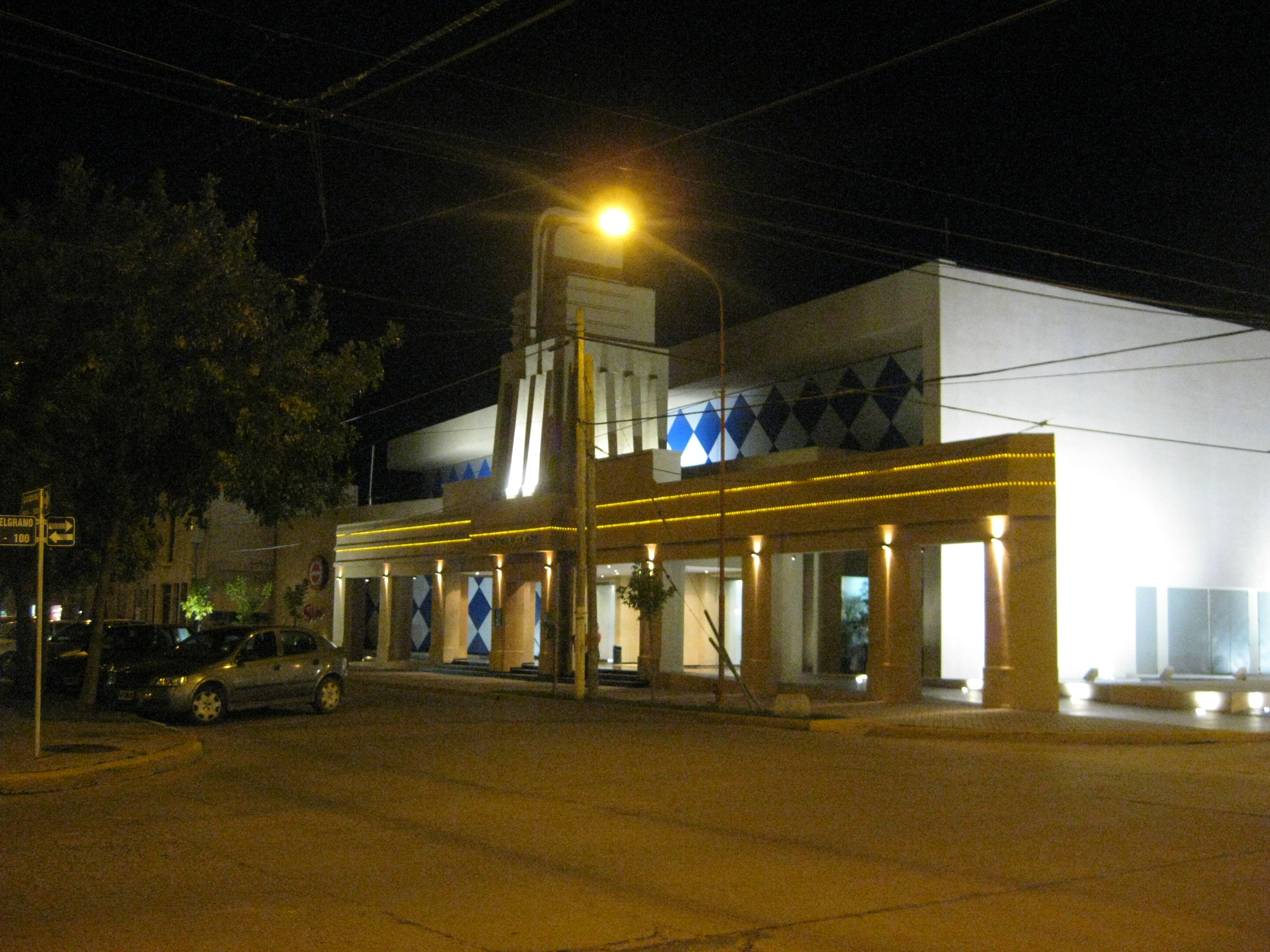
The Casino in Corral.

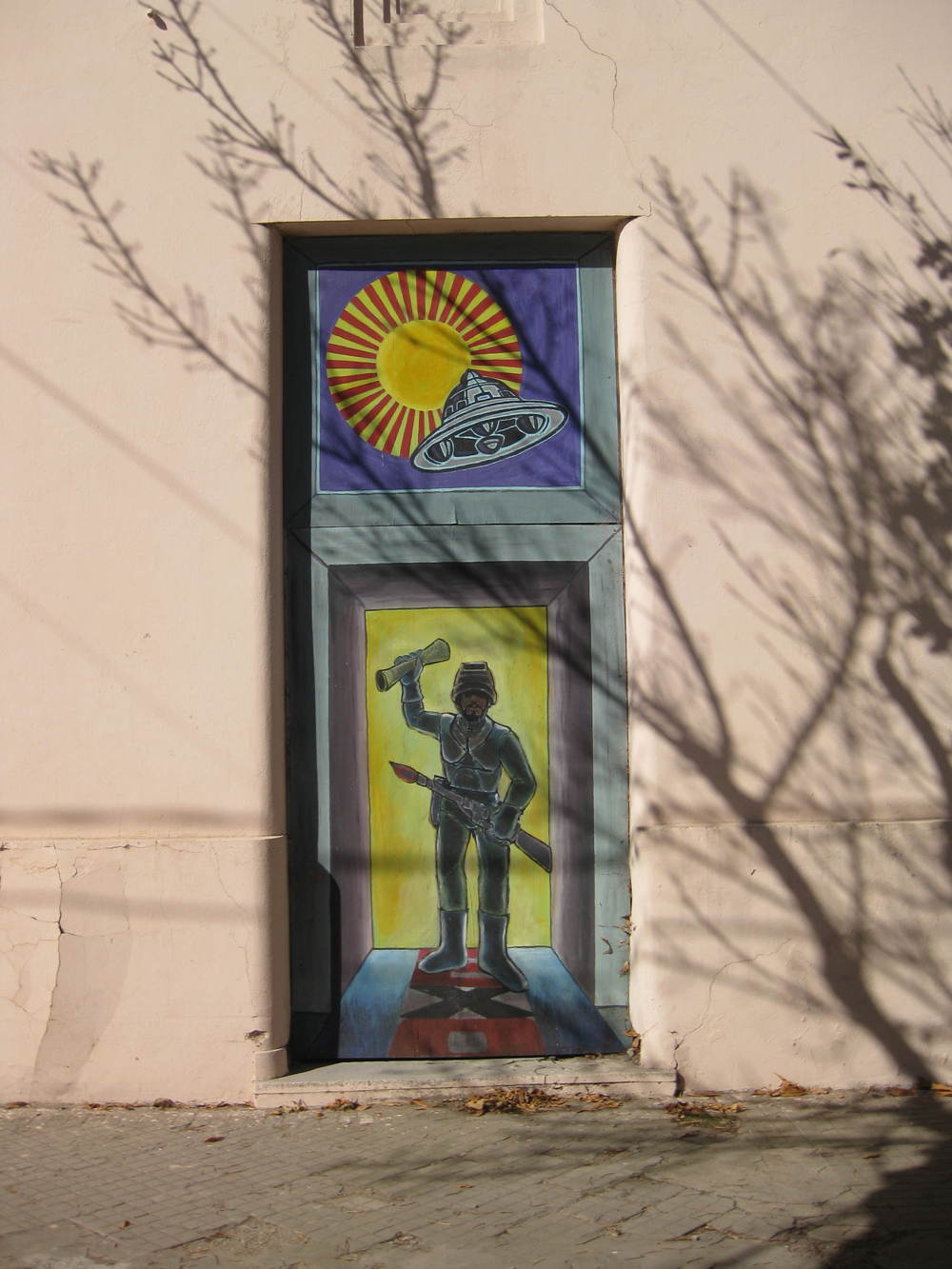
Door in Corral

== Economy ==
The principal economic activity is agriculture, followed by livestock. Trade and industry also have some importance to the local economy, due to the presence of several textile mills.

== Population ==
Corral de Bustos has a population of 11,882 inhabitants as of 2001 (INDEC, 2001) which represents an increase of 5.8% from the previous census with a population of 9,389 in 1991 (INDEC, 1991).

The town is also known as Corral de Bustos - Ifflinger, the second part of the name corresponds to the original name of the locality, which as the time passed the was designated to a part of the town known as barrio Ifflinger. It is a common to hear the residents of the city refer to themselves as 'Corrales'.

The city has two sports institutions, Sporting Club and Club Atlético Social Corralense; in football matches are usually spread throughout the South Regional Soccer Championships League.
