= Channel 10 (Mar del Plata, Argentina) =

TV station in Mar del Plata, Argentina

LU 82 TV Canal 10
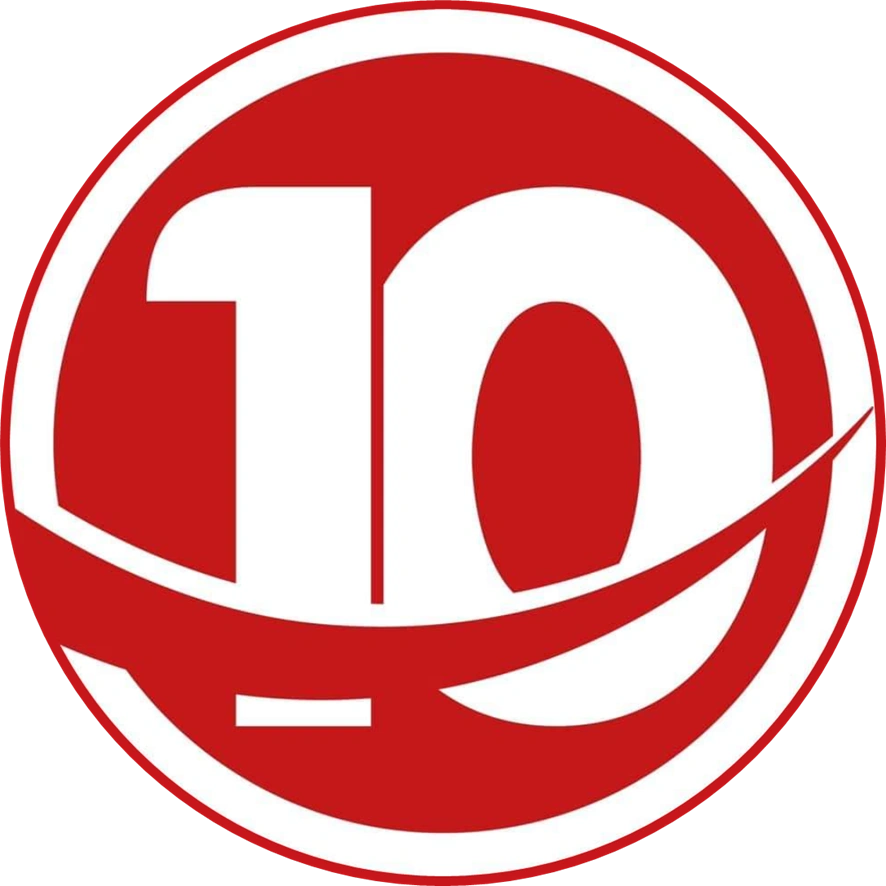

Mar del Plata, Buenos Aires; Argentina
- Channels: Analog: 10 (VHF)
- Branding: El Diez

Programming
- Affiliations: El Trece

Ownership
- Owner: Grupo Olmos; (TV Mar del Plata S.A.)

History
- First air date: March 16, 1963
- Former affiliations: Canal Nueve (until 2004)

Technical information
- Licensing authority: ENACOM

Links
- Website: www.canal10mardelplata.tv

El Diez (call sign LU 82 TV) is a television station broadcasting from Mar del Plata, Buenos Aires, Argentina carrying programs from El Trece and serving as Artear's official representative for said city. Founded in 1966, the station currently produces its own newscast, plus some local entertainment and public affairs programming shown on weekends.

== Local programming ==
- 10 Noticias - noon newscast
- Ahora Noticias - central evening news
- Canal 10 Informa - midnight newscast
- Agenda Agraria - country news
- Sentidos: Vino, Gastronomía y Buen Vivir - cooking
- Sabores para ver de Viaje - tourist
- Octano - motoring
