= Ente Nacional de Comunicaciones =

National communications and media regulator of Argentina

National Communications Entity
- Ente Nacional de Comunicaciones
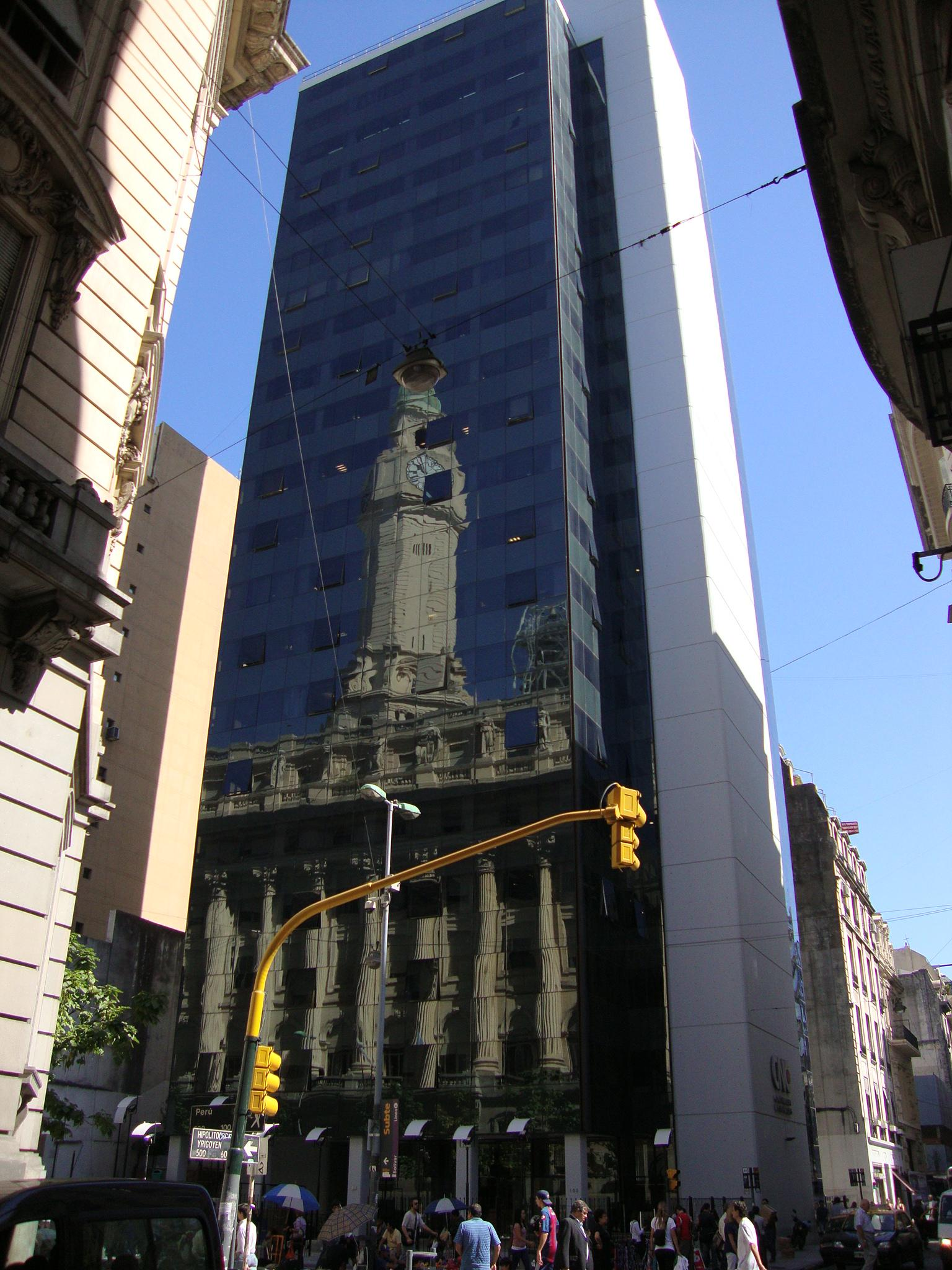
- ENACOM offices in Buenos Aires

Agency overview
- Formed: 5 January 2016; 10 years ago
- Preceding agencies: Federal Authority for Audiovisual Communication Services; Federal Authority for Information and Communication Technologies
- Jurisdiction: Government of Argentina
- Headquarters: Calle Perú 103, Buenos Aires, Argentina; 34°35′42″S 58°22′47″W
- Employees: 360 (2018)
- Annual budget: AR$ 5.15 billion (2019)
- Agency executives: Claudio Ambrosini, President; Gustavo F. López, Vice-president
- Website: enacom.gob.ar

The National Communications Entity (Spanish: Ente Nacional de Comunicaciones, mostly known by its acronym ENACOM) is the national communications and media regulator of Argentina. It was created by a presidential decree in 2016 and combines the former Federal Authority for Audiovisual Communication Services (AFSCA) and the Federal Authority for Information and Communication Technologies.

ENACOM is an agency under the Chief of the Cabinet of Ministers.

== History ==
=== Creation ===
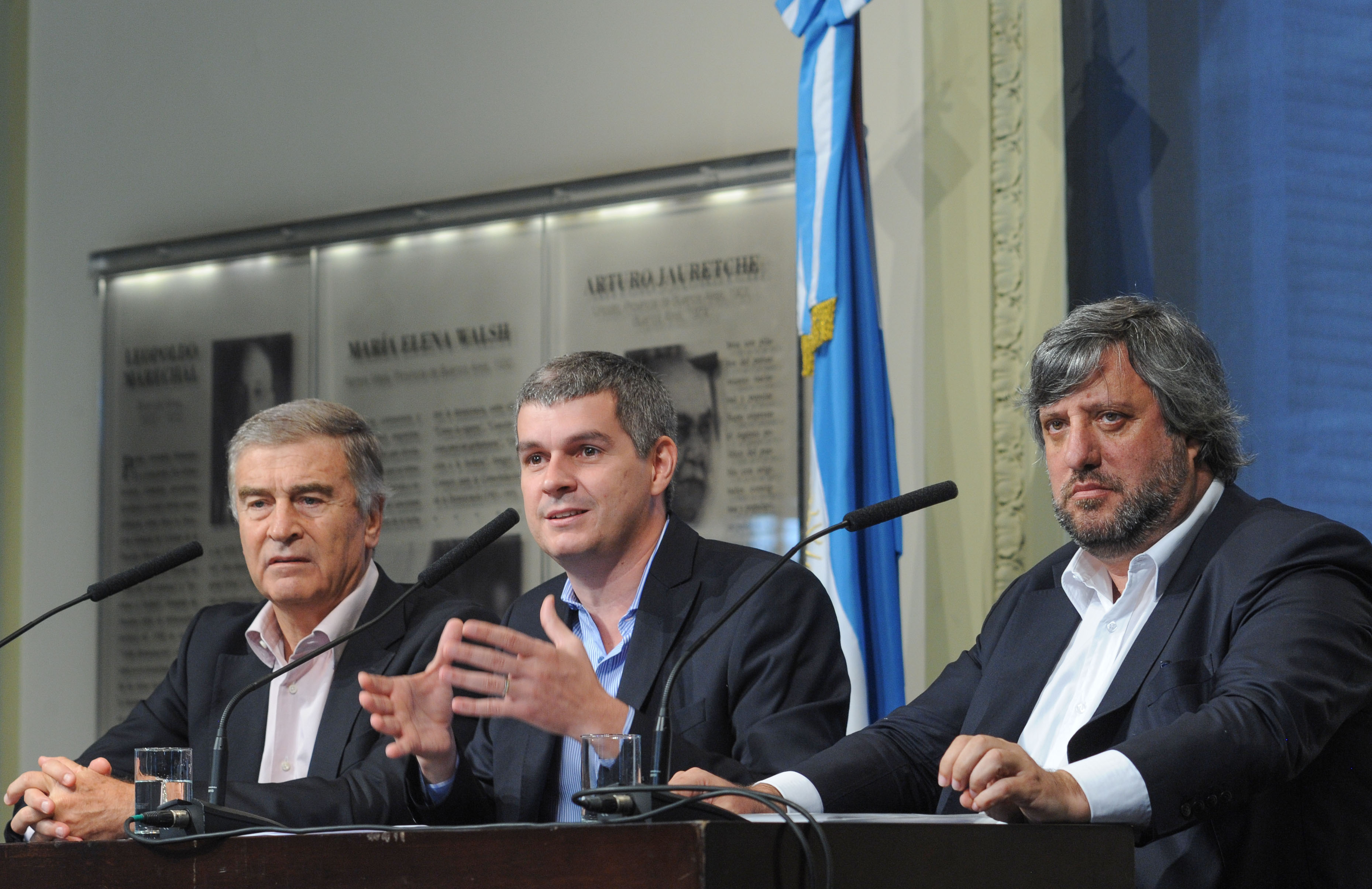
Press conference held by Oscar Aguad, Marcos Peña y Miguel De Godoy, announcing the creation of ENACOM on 30 December 2015

On 23 December 2015, President Mauricio Macri issued Necessity and Urgency Decree (DNU) 243, intervening in the operations of AFSCA and AFTIC. Luis Arias, an administrative law judge in La Plata, had granted a motion seeking to prevent the intervention, but the government moved forward with the changes.

By Decree 267/2015, issued by President Macri on 29 December, AFSCA and AFTIC were combined under the name Ente Nacional de Comunicaciones (ENACOM). The new agency would be placed under the new Ministry of Communications. All active communications licenses were extended for an additional 10 years, limits on how many licenses one group may hold were relaxed, and license transfers were also permitted.

The creation of ENACOM was met with outrage from the opposition, particularly over the use of a DNU to modify a law passed by Congress, which was in recess during January. Martín Sabbatella, who was the president of AFSCA until its intervention, called the decree "brutal, illegal, and anticonstitutional", highlighting that its creation violated a court order. Cinthia Ottaviano, the Public Defender for Audiovisual Communications Services, demanded an urgent meeting of the Organization of American States and an intervention from the Inter-American Human Rights Commission, claiming that the merger "infringed international standards for autonomy, independence, and diversity".

=== ENACOM under Miguel de Godoy and Silvana Giudici ===
By Decree 7/2016, Miguel de Godoy} was officially named as the agency's president, and President Macri named its three directors: Heber Martínez, Alejandro Pereyra and Agustín Garzón. Garzón, former intervenor of AFSCA, was a placeholder until Silvana Myriam Giudici could resign from the Buenos Aires legislature.

In May 2018, Miguel de Godoy presented his resignation, effective 1 June. Giudici was tapped to replace him and remained in the position until the Macri government ended on 10 December 2019.

==== Spectrum reorganization ====
During the Macri government, 195 FM radio stations that had previously operated under provisional permits (Permisos Precarios y Provisorios, PPP) received definitive licenses to operate.

However, some stations were closed. ENACOM resolutions 2064-E/2017 and 9435, which were published on 31 March 2017, gave the agency the right to order "the closure, sequester, warning, fine or seizure of radio stations that are unauthorized or in violation, using force if necessary". A number of stations, including community broadcasters, were soon met with closure notices:

- Entre Ríos: FM Radio Mix 106.5 (Diamante)
- Formosa: FM Popular, FM La Torre, FM Milenium
- Buenos Aires Province: FM Radio M 104.1 (Virrey del Pino), FM Fórmula 87.7 (Merlo), FM Ocupas (Moreno), FM Sol y Verde (José C. Paz)
- San Luis: Radio Masi
- Salta: FM Rosicler 91.3 La Voz del Migrante

The National Alternative Media Network declared the program an attempt to "silence alternative, community and popular voices", criticizing the discretion given to ENACOM to act on "dissident voices". The Union of Audiovisual Communicators of La Matanza decried the move by the government to "cut off, silence and do away with public media".

==== 4G licenses ====
In 2016, ENACOM authorized Nextel Argentina, a subsidiary of Grupo Clarín, to provide 4G services without a public bid or a payment for the spectrum. This prompted the Communications and Freedom of Expression Commission of the Senate to ask ENACOM officials for an explanation and competitor Telefónica to announce legal action for "discriminatory treatment", as it had to pay for its 4G spectrum in a 2014 auction.

==== Correo Argentino fine ====
At the same time that ENACOM was created, state-owned satellite company Argentina Soluciones Satelitales S.A. (ARSAT) y Correo Argentino (CORASA) were transferred to the Ministry of Communications, with ENACOM gaining oversight functions over the two agencies.

In 2017, opposition federal deputy Rodolfo Tailhade claimed that ENACOM had failed to fine Grupo Macri, the president's private businesses, a fine of 300,000 pesos that it had incurred when it owned Correo Argentino and which was upheld in a 2015 court ruling.

=== ENACOM under Claudio Ambrosini ===
Claudio Ambrosini, who had previously been one of the congressionally appointed directors, was named by incoming president Alberto Fernández to head ENACOM in December 2019, with his appointment being formalized on 16 January 2020.

== Board of directors ==
The ENACOM has seven directors, three of which (alongside the president) are named by the executive branch and three from the National Congress of Argentina, by way of a bicameral commission; the seats are allocated to the three largest groups in the legislature. There are currently several vacancies.

Decree 267/2015, which established ENACOM, provides that the directors serve four-year terms, which may be renewed once. The executive branch has the power to remove directors "directly and without cause".

- Designated by the president:
  - Claudio Ambrosini, President(designado por el Poder Ejecutivo)
  - Raúl Quilodran Llamas (designado por el Poder Ejecutivo)
  - Maria Florencia Pacheco (designado por el Poder Ejecutivo)
  - Gustavo López
- Designated by the Congress:
  - Miguel Ángel Giubergia
