= Channel 10 =

Channel 10 or TV10 may refer to:

== Television ==
- Canal 10 (Nicaragua), a television channel from Nicaragua
- Canal 10 (Uruguay), a television channel from Uruguay
- Channel 10 (Israel), a defunct Israeli television channel
- Channel 10 (Córdoba, Argentina)
- Channel 10 (Junín, Argentina)
- Channel 10 (Río Negro, Argentina)
- Channel 10 (Mar del Plata, Argentina)
- Channel 10 (Tucumán, Argentina), a free-to-air channel in the province of Tucumán, Argentina
- Network 10, an Australian commercial television network
  - TEN (TV station), an Australian television station, part of Network 10
- CCTV-10, a Chinese television channel
- Ten (Spanish TV channel), a free-to-air channel in Spain
- TV10 (Dutch TV channel), a proposed Dutch commercial television channel in 1989
- TV10 (Sweden), a television channel in Sweden specializing in sports and documentaries
- TV10 (Rwanda), a Rwandan television channel
- TVES (El Salvador), a Salvadoran public television network
- TV10 Gold, a former Dutch television that aired between 1995 and 1998, now called Veronica
- Canal 10 (France), a proposed French television channel
- Canal 10 (Spain), a defunct Spanish television channel
- BS10 (TV channel), a Japanese television channel
  - BS10 Premium, a Japanese premium television channel
- F10 (TV channel), a Bolivian television channel
- TV10 Israel, an Israeli business television channel
- Tien (TV channel), a defunct Dutch television channel
- Channel Ten (Tanzania), a Tanzanian television channel

== Other uses ==
- Channel 10 (album), a 2009 album by rap duo Capone-N-Noreaga

== See also ==
- Channel 10 branded TV stations in the United States
- Channel 10 virtual TV stations in Canada
- Channel 10 virtual TV stations in Mexico
- Channel 10 virtual TV stations in the United States

For VHF frequencies covering 192-198 MHz:

- Channel 10 TV stations in Canada
- Channel 10 TV stations in Mexico
- Channel 10 digital TV stations in the United States
- Channel 10 low-power TV stations in the United States
