= Artear =

Argentine media company

- Artear logo since 2024
- Trade name: Arte Radiotelevisivo Argentino
- Type: Private
- Industry: Television; Radio; Television producer; Digital media
- Founded: 22 December 1989; 36 years ago
- Headquarters: Ave. San Juan 1160/Lima 1261; Constitución, Buenos Aires, Argentina
- Area served: Argentina; International
- Revenue: ▲US$92 million (2009)
- Net income: ▲US$80 million (2009)
- Owner: Clarín Group (96.87%); GC Minor S.A.U. (0.3188%); AGEA (2.0706%); Ana Cecilia Gollán (0.7362%)
- Parent: Clarín Group
- Website: www.artear.com

Arte Radiotelevisivo Argentino S.A., commonly known as Artear, is an Argentine mass media company owned by the Clarín Group. It operates television stations and pay television networks, produces television and film content, and distributes content through digital platforms. Its flagship television station is El Trece, a Buenos Aires-based broadcast network.

Artear operates and produces content for several television services, including El Trece and Todo Noticias (TN), as well as a number of cable and international channels. The company also has interests in television and film production companies, including Pol-Ka Producciones and Patagonik Film Group.

Its main production facilities are located in the Constitución neighbourhood of Buenos Aires, where Artear operates television studios and technical facilities. In 2017, the company inaugurated a new large-scale media production centre.

== History ==
=== Foundation and acquisition of Canal 13 ===
Artear was founded in 1989 to participate in the privatization process for the television licenses of Channel 11 and Channel 13 in Buenos Aires, which were then operated by the Argentine state.

On 22 December 1989, Artear was awarded the license for LS 85 TV, the license of Channel 13 Buenos Aires, which it continues to operate.

As part of the privatization, Artear acquired the assets and assumed responsibility for the personnel previously belonging to Proartel S.A., or Producciones Argentinas de Televisión, the company founded by Goar Mestre and his associates that had operated Channel 13 before its nationalization in 1973. Proartel was subsequently liquidated by the Argentine state in 1989 in connection with the privatization of the station.

Among the assets associated with Proartel was the property at Cochabamba 1153 in Constitución, where Artear subsequently established its headquarters and television studios. The legal status of the property became the subject of a dispute between Artear and Argentine authorities.

In 2010, the newspaper Tiempo Argentino reported that the property was still owned by the Argentine state and had been made available to Artear under a lease agreement with an option to purchase. The newspaper reported that the agreement had subsequently expired and that Artear continued to occupy the property under an extension granted by the government.

Artear disputed the newspaper's account, stating that the property had been acquired through the purchase option contained in the decree awarding the Channel 13 license and that the property had been registered in Artear's name.

=== Expansion into regional television ===
On 14 December 1998, Artear and Radio Televisión Río Negro, the operator of Channel 10 General Roca, agreed to establish a temporary business association to operate the station and its network of repeaters. Artear held an 85% interest in the association. The license itself remained with the government of Río Negro Province. The agreement was ratified by the provincial legislature through Law No. 3276 on 29 December 1998.

The association assumed operation of Channel 10 on 10 March 1999.

On 25 February 2000, Artear acquired 50.185% of the shares of Telecor S.A., the licensee of Channel 12 Córdoba, from Sociedad Argentina de Medios S.A. and José María Buccafusca. On 16 March of the same year, it acquired an additional 35% from Aron Braver and Francisco Quiñonero.

On 11 November 2000, Artear acquired Teledifusora Bahiense, the licensee of Channel 7 Bahía Blanca, through the acquisition of shares belonging to Carlos D'Amico and Imagen del Trabajo S.A. Imagen del Trabajo was subsequently absorbed by Artear on 9 October 2003. The transactions were approved by the National Communications Agency (ENACOM) in 2016.

=== Bariloche operations ===
On 4 July 2007, Artear acquired Bariloche TV S.A., the licensee of Channel 6 and Radio Seis in San Carlos de Bariloche, for approximately US$1.1 million.

The following day, Artear transferred 0.1% of Bariloche TV's shares to GC Minor, another Clarín Group subsidiary. The transfers were approved by ENACOM in April 2016.

On 4 July 2007, Teledifusora Bahiense also acquired FM del Lago, a Bariloche radio station previously owned by Jorge Frettes. On 17 December 2007, the station was transferred to Radio Mitre.

=== End of the Channel 10 management agreement ===
In November 2008, the Government of Río Negro Province announced that it would not renew its management agreement with Artear for Channel 10 General Roca and that the station would return to provincial control.

The management agreement ended on 10 March 2009. Artear nevertheless retained the station's national commercial management for a period following the end of the operating agreement.

=== 2009 satellite interference ===
In March and May 2009, several Artear television and radio services, including El Trece Satelital, Todo Noticias and Radio Mitre, experienced intermittent satellite interference.

The interference occurred on 24–26 March and 5–6 May and was attributed to the unintentional malfunction of a high-power amplifier operated by another Intelsat customer using the IS-3R satellite.

=== Constitución facilities controversy ===
In 2011, residents of Constitución reportedly complained that Artear had occupied a plot of land opposite its headquarters since 2009 without authorization. The land, located on Lima Street beneath the interchange of the 9 de Julio Avenue expressways, was reportedly owned by the Government of the City of Buenos Aires and used as a private parking area.

Following the complaints, Artear and the city government reportedly reached an agreement in June 2011 concerning the use of the property.

=== 2016 fire ===
On 31 January 2016, a fire broke out in Artear's Constitución building, which houses facilities used by El Trece and TN. The incident resulted in the evacuation of the building and temporarily interrupted several of the company's television services.

El Trece and TN, along with other Artear channels including Ciudad Magazine, Volver and Quiero música en mi idioma, temporarily went off the air while the building was evacuated.

No serious injuries were reported. The fire reportedly originated in a storage room and affected parts of the studios and offices.

El Trece returned to the air later that afternoon with a broadcast of Almorzando con Mirtha Legrand from Mar del Plata.

TN subsequently resumed broadcasting from an emergency location outside the building.

=== Latin American Information Alliance ===
On 1 January 2020, Artear joined the Latin American Information Alliance, with El Trece and Todo Noticias representing the company in the alliance.

=== Sale of Bariloche TV ===
On 22 July 2021, Clarín Group sold 99% of Bariloche TV and its media assets—including Channel 6, Radio Seis and three news websites—to Televisión Litoral S.A., the owner of Channel 3 Rosario. The remaining 1% was sold to Margarita Scaglione. The transaction was valued at US$600,000.

== Assets and operations ==
=== Broadcast television stations ===
Station	Province	City of license	Call sign	Analog	Digital	Operated since
El Trece	Buenos Aires	Buenos Aires	LS 85 TV	13	33	1990
Channel 12 Córdoba	Córdoba Province	Córdoba	LV 81 TV	12	27	2000 (Note: Artear holds 85.185% of the shares of Telecor S.A.C.I., the licensee of Channel 12 Córdoba. The remaining shares are held by Francisco Quiñonero.)
Channel 7 Bahía Blanca	Buenos Aires Province	Bahía Blanca	LU 81 TV	7	28	2000

=== Pay television channels ===
Channel	Genre	Coverage	Notes
Todo Noticias (TN)	News	Argentina and international	
El Trece Satelital	General entertainment	Argentina	Regional feed of El Trece
El Trece Internacional	General entertainment	Argentina, the Americas and Europe	International feed of El Trece
Ciudad Magazine	Variety	Argentina and the Americas	
Metro	Variety	Argentina and the Americas	Produced by Artear
Volver	Classic Argentine film and television	Argentina and the Americas	Features programming from Artear's archives
Quiero música en mi idioma	Music	Argentina and the Americas	Spanish-language music
Canal (á)	Culture	Argentina and the Americas	
América Sports	Sports	Argentina and the Americas	
El Garage TV	Automotive	Americas and Spain	
Canal Rural	Agriculture	Argentina and the Americas	

== Former operations ==
=== Radio ===
Province	City of license	Station	Frequency	Management period	Notes
Río Negro Province	San Carlos de Bariloche	LRG 346 (Radio Seis)	103.1 MHz	2007–2021	Sold to Televisión Litoral S.A.
Río Negro Province	San Carlos de Bariloche	LRG 435	92.1 MHz	July–December 2007	Transferred to Radio Mitre.

=== Television ===
Province	City of license	Station	Channel	Management period	Notes
Río Negro Province	General Roca	LU 92 TV	10	1999–2009 (Note: The station was owned by the Government of Río Negro. Artear operated it through a temporary business association in which it held 85%, under a management agreement with the state-owned Radio Televisión Río Negro.)	Operated by Radio Televisión Río Negro S.E.
Río Negro Province	San Carlos de Bariloche	LU 93 TV	6/27	2007–2021	Sold to Televisión Litoral S.A.

== Logos ==
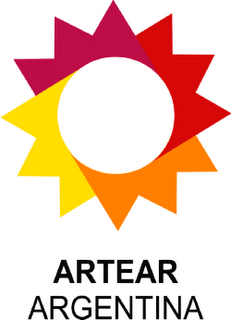
1994–2008

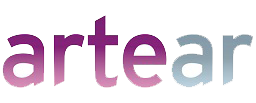
2008–2024

2024–present

== Production companies ==
=== Pol-Ka Producciones ===
Pol-Ka Producciones is an Argentine television production company founded by Fernando Blanco and Adrián Suar. It specializes primarily in scripted television fiction. Artear holds a 55% interest in the company.

=== Patagonik Film Group ===
Patagonik Film Group is an Argentine film production company. Artear holds a 33% interest in the company.

== See also ==
- Clarín Group
- El Trece
- Todo Noticias
- El Trece Internacional
- Ciudad Magazine
- Quiero música en mi idioma
- Channel 12 Córdoba
- Channel 7 Bahía Blanca
