= Grupo Televisión Litoral =

Argentine media company

- Native name: Televisión Litoral S.A.
- Type: Private
- Industry: Broadcasting; Television production; Mass media; Publishing
- Genre: Media conglomerate
- Founded: 1965
- Founder: Alberto Gollán
- Headquarters: Ave. Presidente Perón 8101, Rosario, Santa Fe Province, Argentina
- Area served: Argentina
- Key people: Gustavo Scaglione (CEO); Adrián Gallo (General manager)
- Products: Television channels EltresTV ElseisTV ElochoTV ElnueveTV ElonceTV; Radio stations Radio 2 LV2 FM Vida Frecuencia Plus Radio Cataratas Radio Seis Radio One; Print media La Capital Ámbito Financiero (40%) El Diario (Paraná); Digital media Rosario3.com Bariloche2000.com GNRNoticias.com VDMNoticias.com
- Owner: Gustavo Scaglione (27.45%); Josefina Daminato (27.45%); Ana Cecilia Gollán (19.84%); Carlos Ernesto Daumas (12.88%); Katester family (5.40%); Angel Cardoso (3.24%); Other shareholders (3.74%)
- Subsidiaries: Grupo Telefe; Bariloche TV S.A.
- Website: www.grupotelevisionlitoral.com

Grupo Televisión Litoral (legally Televisión Litoral S.A.) is an Argentine mass media and audiovisual production company headquartered in Rosario, Santa Fe Province. Founded in 1965 by businessman Alberto Gollán, the company began as a terrestrial television broadcaster and subsequently expanded into radio broadcasting, digital news media, publishing and audiovisual production.

The group operates television stations, radio stations, newspapers and digital news outlets in several Argentine provinces. Its principal operations originated in Rosario and include EltresTV, Radio 2 AM 1230, FM Vida 97.9, Frecuencia Plus 93.1 and Rosario3.com. The company subsequently expanded through acquisitions and investments in media outlets in Río Negro Province, Tucumán Province, Buenos Aires Province, Salta Province, Córdoba, Entre Ríos Province, Misiones Province and the Autonomous City of Buenos Aires.

In October 2025, the holding led by Gustavo Scaglione announced the acquisition from Paramount Skydance of the entire share capital of Telefe (Televisión Federal S.A.), Argentina's leading television network. The transaction was announced on 23 October 2025. José Luis Manzano's Integra Capital participated as financial adviser and transaction structurer.

== History ==
=== Foundation and launch of Channel 3 ===
The company was established in the mid-1960s by businessman Alberto Gollán, together with Ernesto Juan Daumas, José Juan Bertagni and Rodolfo Pedro Dianda, with the objective of establishing a terrestrial television station in Rosario.

The company's first television station, LT 83 TV Canal 3, began regular broadcasting on 20 June 1965, coinciding with Flag Day, an Argentine national holiday.

The licence for Channel 3 had been awarded by the Argentine national government in 1964. The station subsequently became the group's flagship operation in Rosario.

=== Expansion into radio broadcasting ===
In December 1982, the group acquired LT2 Radio General San Martín, a radio station founded in 1942, which was subsequently known as Radio 2.

In May 1984, the group launched an FM station on 97.9 MHz, now known as FM Vida. In the same period, the company expanded its radio operations into Misiones Province through Radio Cataratas.

In 1994, the company opened its Communications Center at Avenida Presidente Perón 8101 in Rosario. The complex occupies approximately four hectares and includes television studios and production facilities.

=== Digital media and diversification ===
In 2005, the group launched the Rosario3.com news website. In 2006, it added Frecuencia Plus on FM 93.1.

The expansion marked a broader diversification of the company beyond terrestrial television and radio into digital news and multimedia content.

=== Change in ownership and management ===
Alberto Gollán died on 24 November 2014 at the age of 96, after leading the company for almost five decades.

Following his death, the company's ownership structure was reorganized. In March 2015, a group of local businessmen acquired a 55% stake in Televisión Litoral.

In April 2015, control of the company passed to businessmen Gustavo Scaglione and Josefina Daminato.

On 11 April 2018, Adrián Gallo was appointed general manager of Grupo Televisión Litoral.

The company's ownership structure has been reported as including Gustavo Scaglione, Josefina Daminato, Ana Cecilia Gollán and other shareholders. Media Ownership Monitor identifies Scaglione as the controlling shareholder and Daminato as a major shareholder.

=== National expansion ===
==== Bariloche ====
On 22 July 2021, Televisión Litoral acquired 99% of Bariloche TV S.A. from Grupo Clarín in a transaction reported at US$600,000. The transaction included Channel 6 Bariloche, Radio Seis and the digital outlets Bariloche2000, GNR Noticias and VDM Noticias.

Following the acquisition, Channel 6 adopted the commercial name ElseisTV and became part of the Televisión Litoral network.

==== Tucumán ====
On 31 January 2023, Televisión Litoral took control of Channel 8 Tucumán, subsequently branded ElochoTV. The station continued carrying programming from Telefe.

==== Bahía Blanca ====
On 31 August 2023, Televisión Litoral entered into a partnership with businessman Gustavo Elías, owner of La Nueva, to acquire 50% of Channel 9 Bahía Blanca. The station was subsequently branded ElnueveTV and continued carrying programming from Telefe.

==== Salta ====
On 29 September 2023, the group announced the acquisition of Channel 11 Salta. The station was subsequently branded ElonceTV and continued carrying Telefe programming.

==== Radio Cataratas ====
In August 2024, the Ente Nacional de Comunicaciones (ENACOM) declared illegal the FM broadcasting service operated under the name Radio Cataratas on 105.3 MHz in Puerto Iguazú, Misiones Province. Resolution 343/2024 ordered the immediate and definitive cessation of transmissions and the dismantling of the facilities associated with the service.

==== Radio One ====
In August 2025, the group announced that Grupo Indalo had transferred the licence for Radio One to Televisión Litoral. The transfer was subsequently approved by ENACOM in September 2025.

==== Acquisition of Telefe ====
On 23 October 2025, the holding led by Gustavo Scaglione announced the acquisition from Paramount Skydance of the entire share capital of Telefe (Televisión Federal S.A.).

The transaction brought Telefe into the media group led by Scaglione, which already controlled Televisión Litoral S.A. and La Capital Multimedios. According to Telefe's announcement, Integra Capital, led by José Luis Manzano, participated as financial adviser and transaction structurer.

Following the transaction, Darío Turovelzky remained CEO of Telefe.

== Media assets ==
=== Television ===
Station	Callsign	Launch	Location	Network affiliation / programming
EltresTV	LT 83 TV	20 June 1965	Rosario	Carries programming from El Trece and produces local news and entertainment programming.
ElseisTV	LU 93 TV	1 May 1978	San Carlos de Bariloche	Carries programming from El Trece and produces local programming, including Noticiero Seis.
ElochoTV	LRK 458 TV	8 December 1983	San Miguel de Tucumán	Carries programming from Telefe and produces local news programming.
ElnueveTV	LU 80 TV	15 August 1965	Bahía Blanca	Carries programming from Telefe and produces local programming.
ElonceTV	LW 82 TV	1 April 1966	Salta	Carries programming from Telefe and produces local news programming.
Telefe	LS 84 TV	15 January 1990	National	National television network owned by the group through Televisión Federal S.A.
Telefe International	N/A	6 April 1998	International	International distribution of Telefe programming.

The group describes elTresTV as its flagship station. Its signal reaches parts of Santa Fe, Buenos Aires, Córdoba and Entre Ríos provinces through its terrestrial transmission network.

=== Radio ===
Station	Frequency	Location	Format
Radio 2	AM 1230	Rosario	General
FM Vida	FM 97.9	Rosario	Music and entertainment
Frecuencia Plus	FM 93.1	Rosario	News and music
LV2	FM 99.7	Córdoba	General
Radio Seis	FM 103.1	San Carlos de Bariloche	News and general interest
Radio One 103.7	FM 103.7	Buenos Aires	Music
Radio Cataratas	FM 105.3	Puerto Iguazú	General

Radio Cataratas was ordered to cease operations by ENACOM in 2024 after being declared an illegal FM broadcasting service.

=== Print media ===
Publication	Founded	Location	Focus
La Capital	15 November 1867	Rosario	General news
El Diario	15 May 1914	Paraná	General news
Ámbito Financiero (40%)	9 December 1976	Buenos Aires	Business, economics and politics

=== Digital media ===
Website	Main coverage
Rosario3.com	Rosario and metropolitan area
LaCapital.com.ar	Rosario and metropolitan area
LVdos.com.ar	Córdoba
ElDiario.com.ar	Paraná and metropolitan area
Bariloche2000.com	San Carlos de Bariloche
GNRNoticias.com	General Roca and the Upper Río Negro Valley
VDMNoticias.com	Viedma
Elocho.tv	San Miguel de Tucumán
Elonce.tv	Salta and metropolitan area
MiTelefe.com	Argentina
Ambito.com (40%)	Argentina

=== Audiovisual production ===
The group's audiovisual production interests include investments in production companies and television studios, including La Corte and Ideas HD.

Company	Location	Ownership
La Corte	Buenos Aires	38%
Ideas HD	Córdoba	Minority interest

== Infrastructure ==
The group's principal headquarters and production complex is located at Avenida Presidente Perón 8101 in the Godoy area of Rosario. The complex occupies approximately four hectares and includes television studios, editing and post-production facilities and equipment for high-definition broadcasting.

The company also maintains an office in Buenos Aires at Cerrito 774, 6th floor.

== Notable events ==
The company's itinerant programme Cultura Más Vos was declared of interest by the Rosario City Council on 30 November 2018 in recognition of its social and educational impact.

In December 2022, the facade of the group's headquarters in Rosario was attacked by gunfire on two occasions. The incidents occurred amid a series of threats against media organizations in the city and were condemned by provincial authorities and journalists' organizations.

== Controversies ==
In June 2017, the company dismissed its chief executive officer and another manager as part of an internal restructuring. The company has also faced criticism from political and trade-union sectors concerning its editorial policies and position in the regional media market.

== See also ==
- Telefe
- EltresTV
- ElseisTV
- ElochoTV
- ElnueveTV
- ElonceTV
- La Capital
- Ámbito Financiero
