= Quiero música en mi idioma =

- Country: Argentina
- Broadcast area: Argentina; Chile; Bolivia; Colombia; Ecuador; Peru; Uruguay; Paraguay; Venezuela; Costa Rica; Honduras; Dominican Republic
- Headquarters: 1160/1261 San Juan Avenue, Constitución, City of Buenos Aires

Programming
- Picture format: 1080i HDTV (upscaled to 16:9 480i/576i for the channel's standard-definition feed)

Ownership
- Owner: Grupo Clarín
- Parent: Artear

History
- Launched: August 4, 2008
- Replaced: BitBox TV
- Former names: Rock & Pop TV (2004–2008); BitBox TV (2008)

Links
- Website: qmusica.tv

Quiero música en mi idioma (simply Quiero) is an Argentinan subscription television channel dedicated to Spanish-language music. It is operated by Artear, a division of Grupo Clarín.

== History ==
It was launched on 4 August 2008, replacing the temporary channel BitBox TV, which in turn had replaced Rock & Pop TV (2004–2008).

On 20 October 2010, the Promax/BDA Awards were held at the Marriott Plaza in Buenos Aires, honoring the best promotional work in Latin America. Quiero received a Silver award in the "Special Project Promotion" category for the campaign "Gustavo Quiero verte bien". The campaign aimed to bring to the public a large flag on which people could leave messages of encouragement for musician Gustavo Cerati after he suffered a stroke in Venezuela. The flag toured several provinces of Argentina, eventually reaching 150 meters in length and carrying more than 15,000 messages for the musician. The flag is now in the possession of Cerati’s closest associates. While it was displayed outside the channel’s headquarters in Buenos Aires, as well as in Mar del Plata, Mendoza, Córdoba, Rosario, the Fleni Institute and the Planetarium, thousands of people left their hopes, tears, and best wishes there.

On 4 July 2011, Quiero’s program Escuela de Música, alternately hosted by Carolina Ibarra and Bebe Contepomi, received an Honorable Mention at the 17th Premios Fund TV (broadcast by Volver) for productions aired in 2010. The Fund TV Award recognizes programs and advertising pieces with educational value that benefit their audiences.

In August 2014, as part of its compliance with the Audiovisual Communication Services Law, Grupo Clarín decided to sell its shares in IESA (Inversora de Eventos S.A.) to the U.S.-based investment fund 34 South Media LLC. Before its sale, the channel was added to IESA, previously owned by Artear.

== Awards ==
Since 2009, the Premios Quiero have been awarded, recognizing Latin American singers. Eligible nominees are those artists with recently released albums whose music has been broadcast on Quiero.

== See also ==
- Premios Quiero
- El Trece
- Ciudad Magazine
