= Mass media in Rwanda =

There are several different types of mass media in Rwanda: television, radio and magazines. Apart from the internet and social media, its purpose are both to disseminate necessary information to the Rwandan community. The mass media is usually self-censored to avoid offending the government, and the most popular forms of mass media is radio, followed by television.

== Media industry profiles ==
=== Radio ===
Radio is the most popular medium of information in Rwanda, and is generally regarded as more trustworthy than other forms such as social media.

Radio broadcasting in Rwanda is primarily conducted through a subsidiary of the Rwanda Broadcasting Agency (RBA), Radio Rwanda. The station transmits on FM 100.7 and offers programming in Kinyarwanda, English, French and Kiswahili. Radio Rwanda complements other national and private media outlets, which mainly broadcast in English and Kinyarwanda, the two most widely used languages in Rwanda and the country's working and national languages, respectively.

In recent years, as Rwanda's economy has expanded and access to digital platforms has improved, radio has experienced a relative decline in audience share, while government and private investment have increasingly focused on the television and digital media sectors.

=== Newspapers ===
Rwanda no longer uses printed newspapers, with its last hard-copy paper being from The New Times in 2020, which was also the oldest newspaper established and used in Rwanda, which also owns a newspaper joint in Kinyarwanda, called Izuba Rirashe. Since then, newspapers have shifted digital, with digital media in general being the third most consumed source of information, although only 34% of Rwandans owning a smartphone (84% owning a phone).

The New Times has been criticized for being "too servile" to the ruling party of Rwanda, and being "excessively optimistic". As such, competitors in the English-language newspaper industry have sprung up, with the formation of another large-scale English newspaper News of Rwanda in 2011. Other minor newspapers have also been created to counter the pro-establishment role of the newspaper, such as The Rwandan, Rwanda Eye and Business Daily. Several newspaper publishers also provide Kinyarwanda-language newspapers, including both News of Rwanda and The Rwandan. In June 2018, News of Rwanda closed.

==== News websites ====
Title	About	Website	Established
The New Times	Leading news website in Rwanda, private but adopts a strong government stance.	https://www.newtimes.co.rw/	1995
Igihe	Privately owned but adopts a pro-government stance.	https://en.igihe.com/index.php	2009
Umuseke	Popular, privately owned.	https://umuseke.rw/	2010
Kigali Today	Affiliated with the Rwandan Defence Force but primarily focuses on national developments rather than operations.	https://www.kigalitoday.com/	2011
Rwanda today	Part of a Kenyan-based conglomerate.	https://rwandatoday.africa/	2018

=== Television ===
The Rwandan television industry is made up of 12 TV stations. 84% of TV stations are owned by private companies (10 out of 12), while the remaining 8% each are owned by public and religious organisations respectively. The state-owned Rwandan Broadcasting Agency runs the TV station Rwanda Television (RTV).

The first private television station, TV10, made its first broadcast on 1 March 2013. Its launch led to a surge in private channels, primarily dependent on foreign content.

=== Book publishers ===
A major share of the market is controlled by nine indigenous publishers, among which four have opened bookshops in the country. Before the genocide against the Tutsi, there were no publishing houses in Rwanda. The situation improved after the incident, with the first indigenous publisher established in the country, Bakame Editions. Since the turn of the century, major publishers from all across the world such as Oxford University Press and Macmillan Publishers have begun making inroads into the local publishing industry. However, the establishment of publishing houses locally and from abroad has not instituted a healthy reading culture in Rwanda, and local publishers have decried the fact that the younger generation does not often participate in this pastime. Despite the boom in the local publishing industry, a similar spell of growth has yet to be seen in the commercial trading of books. Bookstores remain a rare sight in Rwanda, and the first library in the country was established in 2012 in Kigali.

== Legal regulation of media ==
A statutory authority has been established according to the Constitution of Rwanda, called The Media High Council. The official mission of the council is to guide the industry in reflecting trends of globalization, to equip the industry with the skills required, and to conduct necessary research to improve the sector. The legal responsibilities of the council is further elaborated in section Nº03/2013 of the law. Freedom of the press in Rwanda is enshrined within Article 34 of the Constitution of Rwanda:

"Freedom of the press and freedom of information are recognized and guaranteed by the State.

Freedom of speech and freedom of information shall not prejudice public order and good morals, the right of every citizen to honour, good reputation and the privacy of personal and family life. It is also guaranteed so long as it does not prejudice the protection of the youth and minors.

The conditions for exercising such freedoms are determined by law.

There is hereby established an independent institution known as the "High Council of the Press ».

The law shall determine its functions, organization and operation."

As such, it is imperative for the government and the people to recognize the freedom of the press in Rwanda, as stated in the Constitution of Rwanda. The media should be free from all government intervention, and is only governed by the autonomous Media High Council.

== Freedom of the press ==
According to Freedom House, Rwanda's Press Freedom score was 79 in 2015 (0 represents the best score, 100 represents the worst score), and was considered "not free" by its standards. Throughout the years, journalists have faced continuous harassment from the government, including arbitrary arrests and threats. Journalists also practice self-censorship for fear of government retaliation, dealing a severe blow to Rwanda's freedom of the press. The government also actively participated in potentially unconstitutional acts of interfering with the media, by banning BBC's Kinyarwanda service in Rwanda due to the airing of a controversial documentary.

== See also ==
- Elections in Rwanda
- Telecommunications in Rwanda
- Press Freedom
- Constitution of Rwanda
- Media of Africa

== Bibliography ==
- "Rwanda: Directory: Broadcasting and Communications". Africa South of the Sahara 2004. Regional Surveys of the World. Europa Publications. 2004. p. 893. ISBN 1857431839.
