= El Trece Internacional =

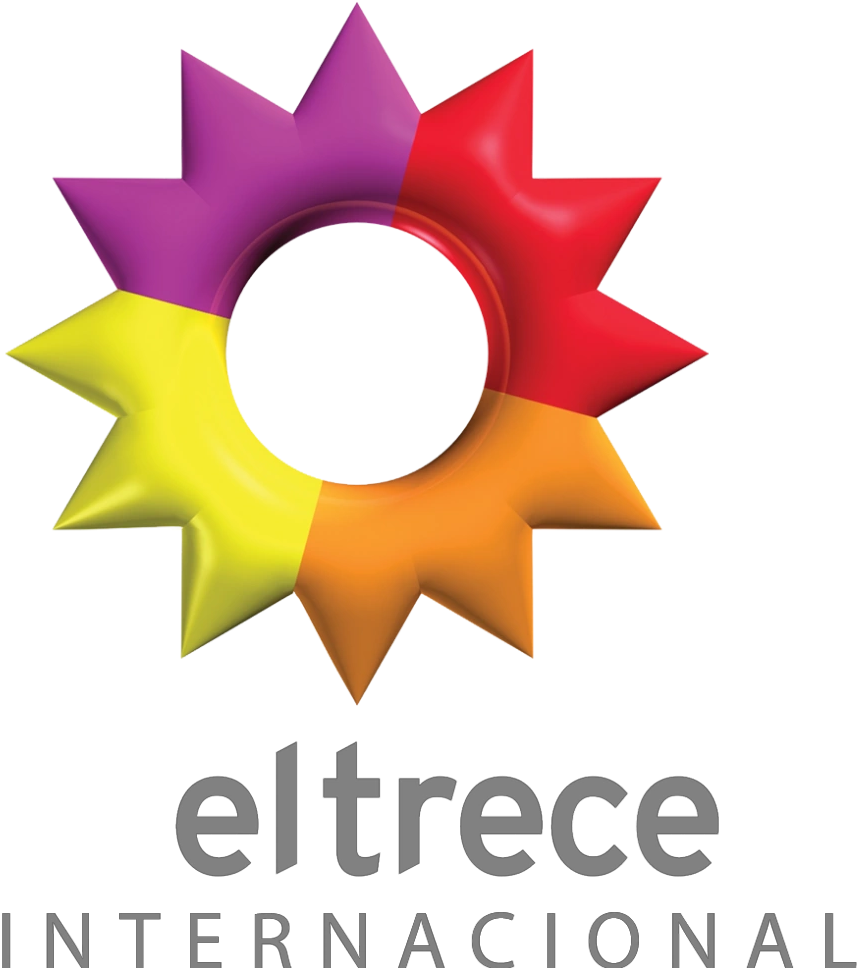
- Country: Argentina
- Broadcast area: Argentina, Americas and Europe
- Network: El Trece
- Headquarters: Buenos Aires, Argentina

Programming
- Picture format: HDTV 1080i (downscaled to 576i/480i for the SD feed)

Ownership
- Owner: Artear
- Sister channels: El Trece; TN; Volver; TyC Sports Internacional; Ciudad Magazine

History
- Launched: April 6, 2009

Links
- Website: http://www.eltrecetv.com.ar/ In English

Availability

Streaming media
- Sling TV: Internet Protocol television

El Trece Internacional is the international signal of El Trece from Argentina. It is a Spanish-language cable channel which broadcasts telenovelas, series, teen and children's series, comedies, entertainment programs, etc. produced by Pol-ka and Ideas del Sur. It was launched on April 6, 2009. El Trece Internacional is available in Argentina, Americas and Europe.

Their signal is broadcast by Intelsat 11. Also El Trece has an HD signal that was available in Vodafone and VTR.

== History ==
The signal was launched on April 6, 2009. Initially, the signal used to broadcast a block called Animatic TV. In August 2014, it was broadcast on the channel Volver.

In 2014, eltrece Internacional launched its version in HD.

Since 2015, the channel broadcasts segments showing different landscapes of Argentina, called "Argentina Mía", during breaks.

In February 2018, Eltrece Internacional is incorporated into the Flow Uruguay grid.

In Argentina, eltrece Internacional is also available in the that country and the channel is carried by other Argentine TV operators.

== Signal structure ==
- International signal: covers all Latin American, the Caribbean and European countries including Argentina, as well as the United States. Use as reference the timetables of Santiago (UTC-4/-3 DST), Bogotá (UTC-5), San José (UTC-6) and Madrid (UTC+1/+2 CET).

== Programming ==
- Esperanza mía
- Lobo
- Socias
- El puntero
- Signos
- Guapas
- Showmatch
- Real o no Real
- A todo o nada
- Los 8 escalones
- El diario de Mariana
- Este es el show
- La mesa esta lista
- Como anillo al dedo
- Arriba Argentinos
- Noticiero Trece
- Telenoche
- Sintesis
