= Radio Suaritos =

Havana; Cuba
- Broadcast area: Province of Havana
- Frequency: 860 kHz
- Branding: CMBL Radio Suaritos

Programming
- Language: Spanish

History
- First air date: 1935
- Former call signs: CMCB
- Call sign meaning: CMBL (AM); COCM (SW)

Radio Suaritos was a radio station broadcasting from Havana, Cuba, owned by the Laureano Suárez Valdés ("Suaritos"), initially on AM 750 kHz and later on AM 860 kHz. The station broadcast for 21 years, between 1935 and 1956, until it filed for bankruptcy due to lack of advertisers and audience, being sold to new owners.

== History ==
In 1933 the CMCB was inaugurated on the top of a Vedadense building (Calle 25 number 1111, between 6 and 8), by Miguel Gabriel Juri and Angel Cambó. Later, CMCB changed its address to Monte y Cárdenas.

In 1935 Laureano Suárez Valdés ("Suaritos") purchased the old CMCB location and equipment, installed its radio there. Valdés is a businessman, technician, recorder, announcer and advertiser. The new poseor increases the power of the station, bringing signals to the entire Caribbean area and further expanding the musical collection in the history of Cuban radio.

Figures that achieved stardom were their first artistic weapons on Radio Suaritos: Merceditas Valdés, Xiomara Alfaro, Celina y Reutilio, among others, thanks to the broadcaster. With the orchestra on the radio, they recorded global idols, such as Pedro Vargas, Tito Guizar and Toña la Negra.

Suaritos created anti-pirate programming, as some Cuban stations recorded songs that were played exclusively on Radio Suaritos, when in the midst of any song, unexpectedly he heard his voice saying: "¡Aquí Radio Suaritos!" ("Here Radio Suaritos!"). Suaritos created a new advertising genre: double-meaning advertisements, with which the public rebels with laughter.

In 1956, due to administrative problems at Radio Suaritos, Goar Mestre (owner of Circuito CMQ) tried to buy the station, but Laureano Suárez Valdés rejected the offer. A few months later, the "Cadena Suaritos" went bankrupt and Suaritos was forced to file for bankruptcy. The station went bankrupt due to lack of advertisers, selling all its frequencies to other entrepreneurs. "CMBL Radio Suaritos" was renamed "CMBL Radio Aeropuerto Internacional" to broadcast flight departures and arrivals and interviews with travelers in the capital Havana.

In 1958, two years after the bankruptcy of "Cadena Suaritos" and its sale, Laureano Suárez Valdés dies.

== Collection ==
Little or nothing is known about the fate of the extinct broadcaster's collection, as it is shared among hundreds of people. Some claim that María Teresa Vera left around nine hundred recordings on this station.

== Frequencies ==
Location	Call sign	Power [kW]	AM Frequency [kHz]	SW frequency [MHz]
La Habana (Havana)	CMBL	5	860	
