= Cristal Festival Europe =

The Cristal Festival (formerly known as the Méribel Ad Festival) is an international festival for professionals in communication, advertising, and the creative world. It is held every year in December in the ski resort of Courchevel in the French Alps. Over 1000 people attend the festival annually, coming for its debates, conferences, and workshops by keynote speakers on industry trends and developments.

Throughout the year, the festival provides networking and knowledge-sharing through the Cristal Academies: national clubs (in France, Spain, Russia, and the UK), built around the advertising industry, such as media and production. The winners of this festival are included in the ABC Show.

== History ==
Originally taking place in Méribel, the festival commenced in 2001. It moved to Crans Montana in the Swiss Alps in 2009. Since 2004, it has opened up to the world with an increasing number of participants and visitors. Over 1,000 delegates attended the 2008 edition, with many clients. In 10 years, the event has become an important venue for the communication world in December.

The festival seeks to promote advertising creativity and showcase works from the industry through several competitions and through knowledge-sharing. The competitions therein mark the closure of and announce the broad tendencies of the coming international Prizes.

The Cristal Lab, created from the beginning, is the moment to get an overview of the latest trends and developments in the industry, and is a meeting place for European and international specialists. It consists of debates, Keynote speaker conferences, and workshops. The Cristal Lab is also a place used for business and creative exchanges.

== Awards ==
The Cristal Festival is a 5-day competition where creativity in the advertising world is rewarded & highlighted. A President of the Festival is appointed every year.

Here are some of the previous presidents:
– 2010 : Mark Tutssel, Chief Creative Officer – Leo Burnett Worldwide
– 2009 : David Jones, Global CEO – Havas Worldwide
– 2007 : Howard Draft – Chairman & CEO – Draftfcb Worldwide
– 2006 : Kevin Roberts – CEO – Saatchi & Saatchi Worldwide

11 prizes are awarded by several juries composed of advertising professionals and advertisers. Prizes are awarded to advertising agencies, producers, and advertisers. They have to come from European countries.

Each of the following prizes includes a Cristal (product categories) and a Grand Cristal, independent of the category.

The Film and Radio Cristals. In 2010, the Jury President of both prizes was Olivier Altmann, Chief Creative Officer at Publicis Worldwide

The International Production Cristal. In 2010, the president of the jury was James Covill, executive producer at Grey London

The Outdoor, Press and Print Craft Cristals. In 2010, the Jury President was Paul Smith, Regional Creative Director EAME at Ogilvy & Mather

The Media Cristal awards the success of a media strategy. In 2010, the Jury President was Mauricio Sabogal, Worldwide Managing Director at Initiative, and President at Mediabrands Latin America

The Integrated and Brand Content Cristals. In 2010, the jury president was Tom O’Keefe, Executive Creative Director at Draftfcb North America

The Consumer Marketing Cristal Prize involves different product categories, such as Client Loyalty, Marketing Action to Premium Client, and Technologic Innovation. In 2010, the jury president was Daniel Morel, Chairman & CEO at Wunderman

The Digital & Mobile Cristal rewards creativity in online campaigns. Indeed, this prize rewards 25 categories such as Home Page Customization or Viral Film. In 2010, the Jury President was Fernanda Romano, Global Creative Director of Digital & Experiential at Euro RSCG

Each year, several people have been awarded the Cristal of Honour during the festival, such as Bryan Buckley, director at Hungry Man USA, who is particularly known for creating Super Bowl classics.
