= Channel 3 (Rosario, Argentina) =

TV station in Rosario, Santa Fe, Argentina

LT 83 TV Canal 3
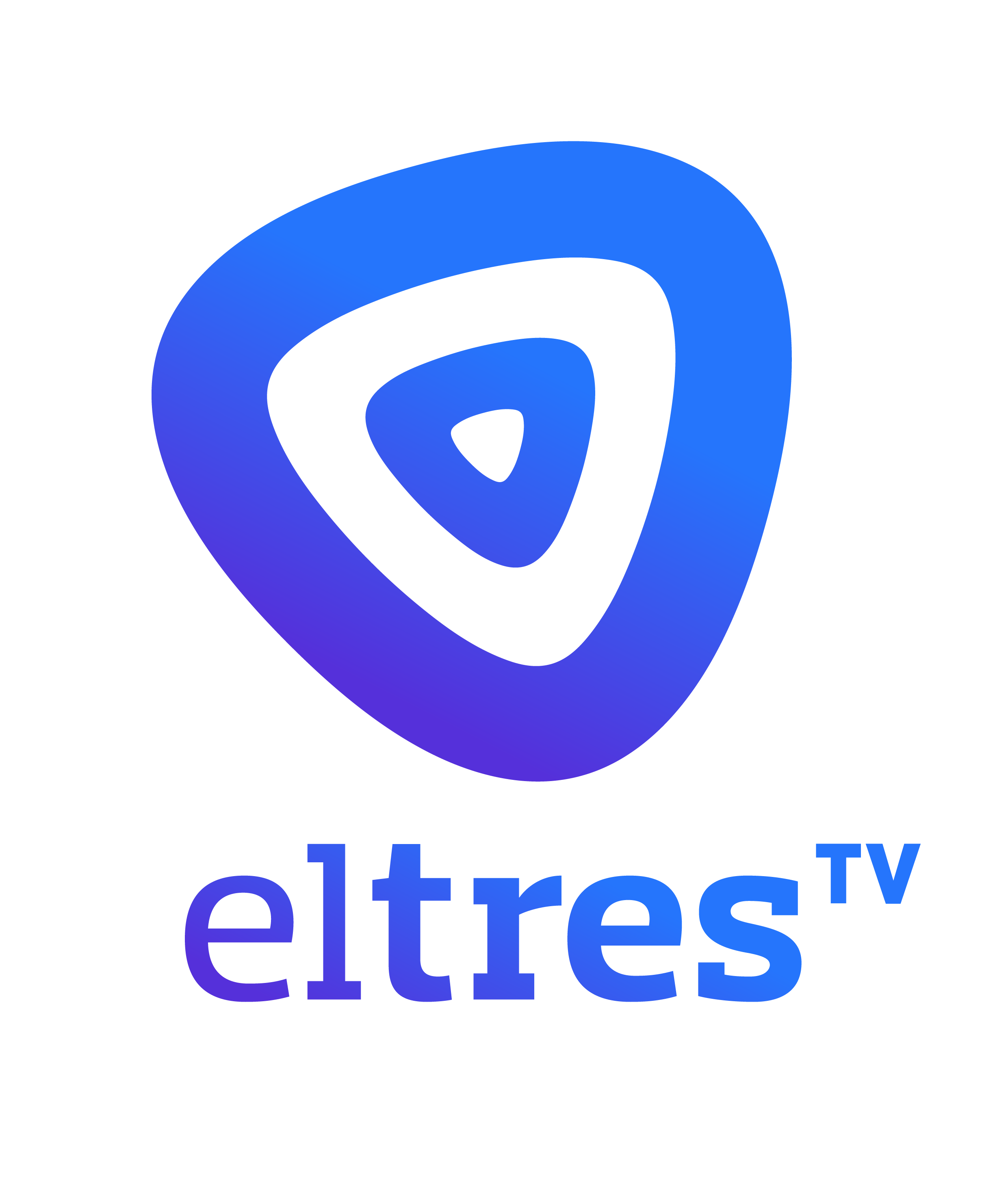
- Rosario, Santa Fe; Argentina
- Channels: Analog: 3 (VHF); Digital: 32 (UHF)
- Branding: eltres TV

Programming
- Affiliations: El Trece

Ownership
- Owner: Televisión Litoral, S.A.
- Sister stations: elseis TV elocho TV elnueve TV elonce TV

History
- Founded: 20 June 1965
- Former names: Canal 3 Rosario (1965–2011); El Tres (2011–2018)

Technical information
- Licensing authority: ENACOM

Links
- Website: www.rosario3.com

Eltres TV (call sign LT 83 TV) is an Argentine private, over-the-air television station broadcasting from Rosario, province of Santa Fe as El Trece's commercial representative in that area. The station is the flagship property of locally-based Grupo Televisión Litoral, alongside two radio stations, Plus FM on 93.1 MHz FM and Radio 2 on 1230 kHz AM.

== History ==
LT 83 TV received its federal license in August 1964 and signed on 20 June 1965, some years after shareholders exploited the foundation of a television station. It moved its studios several times in the 1960s and early 1970s to cope with a growing demand for television in the region.

Channel 3 started broadcasting in color on 1 May 1980, using the PAL-N system as with every other TV station in the country. Full color programming began with a military parade on June 20 of that year. The station also produced such important local programming as the matches held in Rosario during the 1978 FIFA World Cup and Pope John Paul II's visit to the city in 1987.

In 2007, LT 83 suffered the second tower collapse in its history, causing damage to the station's studios. In 2011, it rebranded as El Tres.

In 2015, after the death of owner Alberto Casiano Gollán, a 55% share in Televisión Litoral, the license holder, was sold to local businessmen associated with the Fundación Libertad group, for around US$13 million.

Currently, the station operates with a 30 kW transmitter, using four translators to reach all the province.

== Programming ==
Channel 3 holds an affiliation with Artear's El Trece and primarily airs its national programs. However, it also is involved in the production of local news and other programs. The local news on El Tres tends to focus specifically on the Rosario metropolitan area, with little if any coverage of southern Santa Fe province or the cities where repeaters are located. Local programs include Antes de salir, a morning show, De 12 a 14 at midday and a local version of Actualidad 3 aired at night And at midnight, División Telenoticiosa.

== See also ==
- Telefe Rosario, Channel 3's only competitor.
