= Channel 9 (Bahía Blanca, Argentina) =

TV station in Bahía Blanca, Buenos Aires Province, Argentina

LU 80 TV Canal 9
- Bahía Blanca, Buenos Aires; Argentina
- Channels: Analog: 9 (VHF)
- Branding: elnueve TV

Programming
- Affiliations: Telefe

Ownership
- Owner: Televisión Litoral S.A. (50%); La Nueva Provincia (50%)
- Sister stations: eltres TV elseis TV elocho TV elonce TV

History
- First air date: September 24, 1965
- Former names: Telenueva Bahía Blanca (1965-2001); Canal 9 (2001-2018); Telefe Bahía Blanca (2018-2023

Technical information
- Licensing authority: ENACOM

Links
- Website: www.grupotelevisionlitoral.com/elnuevetv/

Elnueve TV (call sign LU 80 TV) is an Argentine television station that broadcasts from the city of Bahía Blanca. The station can be seen in part of the southwest of the province of Buenos Aires through repeaters. It carries programs from Telefe and is jointly owned by Grupo Televisión Litoral and La Nueva Provincia.

== History ==
On October 10, 1963, through Decree 9089 (published on January 11, 1964), the National Executive Branch awarded newspaper La Nueva Provincia SRL a license to exploit the frequency of channel 9 in the city of Bahía Blanca, province of Buenos Aires. The company was made up of 18 partners, among whom were Diana Lía Julio Pagano de Massot, Lía Esther Manuela Julio de Contal, Benita Haydeé Julio de Errea and Emma Rita Juliana Julio de Latorre.

Channel 9 of Bahía Blanca began broadcasting on August 15, 1965, although its official inauguration was on September 24. The channel, which at that time was operated commercially as Telenueva, was founded by the same newspaper.

In 1971, the LU 80 license was re-awarded to the company Telenueva SA.

On November 12, 1982, through Decree 1207 (published on November 17), the National Executive Branch renewed the license granted to Channel 9.

== Local programming ==
- Audiomotor
- Vivo Bahía Blanca - newscast
- De Shopping - variety
- A las Chapas - motoring
- Por Bahía - public affairs
- Rebelion en la Chacra
- Codigo femenino
- Inversiones del Sur
- Bahia directo
- Olimpo es de Primera - sports program

== See also ==
- Channel 7 (Bahía Blanca, Argentina), Channel 9's only competitor.
