= FIAP =

FIAP, an acronym, may refer to:

- Fédération Internationale de l'Art Photographique, the International Federation of Photographic Art
- Festival Iberoamericano de Publicidad, the Ibero-American Advertising Festival
- Federation of Inter-Asian Philately
- Federazione italiana associazioni partigiane
- Fellow of the Institution of Analysts and Programmers
