= El Doce =

TV station in Córdoba, Argentina

El Doce (LV 81 TV Canal 12)
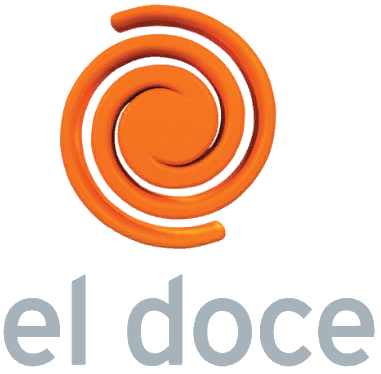
- Córdoba; Argentina
- City: Córdoba, Argentina
- Channels: Analog: 12 (VHF); Digital: 40 (UHF)
- Branding: El Doce

Programming
- Affiliations: El Trece

Ownership
- Owner: Grupo Clarín (85.185%) Francisco Quiñonero (14.815%); (Artear/Telecor S.A.C.I.)

History
- First air date: 18 April 1960
- Former names: Canal 12 (1960-2009)

Technical information
- Licensing authority: ENACOM

Links
- Website: www.eldoce.tv

Channel 12 (commonly known as El Doce) is an Argentine free-to-air television station affiliated with El Trece and based in Córdoba. The station broadcasts throughout much of Córdoba Province, as well as parts of Catamarca Province and Santa Fe Province through a network of repeaters. It is primarily operated by Artear, a subsidiary of Clarín Group, through Telecor S.A.C.I.

== History ==
The station began regular transmissions on 18 April 1960 as LU1-H TV Channel 13 Córdoba. It was founded by Telecor S.A.C.I. and became the first over-the-air television station in the interior of Argentina, the second television station in the country and the first privately owned station in Argentina.

On 10 October 1963, through Decree 9088, the National Executive Power authorized Telecor S.A.C.I. to move the station to channel 12 of the VHF band. Its call sign was consequently changed from LU1-H to LV 81 TV.

On 18 April 1967, Canal 12 installed its first repeater on the summit of Cerro La Rosilla. On 3 August 1970, after the repeater's facilities had been inspected and found to be operating correctly, the National Broadcasting and Television Authority authorized its regular operation.

In 1971, the station established its first live link with Buenos Aires when it broadcast the news program Telenoche from El Trece.

On 1 April 1980, Canal 12 began experimental colour broadcasts.

On 12 November 1982, through Decree 1207, published on 17 November, the National Executive Power renewed the license granted to Channel 12.

=== Catamarca repeater dispute ===
In November 1987, the then governor of Catamarca Province, Vicente Saadi, ordered the forcible takeover of Channel 11, a repeater operated by Channel 12 in the Sierra de Ancasti. The takeover occurred on 12 November, and the repeater was used during the evening to broadcast programming from the provincial public station Catamarca Televisora Color (CTC).

The intervention of the frequency resulted in a dispute between the provincial government and Telecor, the licensee of Channel 12.

CTC ceased broadcasting programming in 1989.

In 1990, the government of Catamarca, then headed by Ramón Saadi, and Telecor reached an agreement, ratified by Provincial Decree 2082/90, under which the province recognized Telecor's use of Channel 11 and the facilities used to retransmit Channel 12's signal. The province also agreed to assume the expenses resulting from the litigation.

=== Ownership changes ===
On 7 June 1997, Guillermo Liberman acquired 49.815% of Telecor's shares. On 25 March 1998, Liberman transferred those shares to Sociedad Argentina de Medios S.A.

On 25 February 2000, Arte Radiotelevisivo Argentino (Artear), a subsidiary of the Clarín Group, acquired 50.185% of Telecor's shares previously held by Sociedad Argentina de Medios S.A. and José María Buccafusca. Ricardo R. Blanco was appointed to lead the company. On 16 March of the same year, Artear acquired an additional 35% of Telecor's shares from Aron Braver and Francisco Quiñonero.

The transfer of 85.185% of Telecor's shares to Artear was approved by the Secretariat for Competition and Consumer Defence on 30 August 2000 and by ENACOM on 5 April 2016.

On 2 November 2002, shareholder Aron Braver died. His Telecor shares passed to Carmen Victoria Quiñonero and her nephew Francisco Quiñonero, who was also a shareholder of the station.

Carmen Quiñonero died on 30 December 2012. On 22 July 2013, the shares she had held were transferred to Francisco Quiñonero. The transfer was approved on 12 April 2016.

=== Digital television ===
In December 1998, through Resolution 2611, the Secretariat of Communications authorized Canal 12 to conduct tests in digital terrestrial television under the ATSC standard. The standard had been established through Resolution 2357. Channel 13 in the VHF band was assigned to the station for the tests.

On 8 November 2011, the Federal Authority for Audiovisual Communication Services authorized Canal 12, through Resolution 1663, to conduct digital terrestrial television tests using the ISDB-T standard. Argentina had adopted the standard through Decree 1148/2009. Channel 40 of the UHF band was assigned to Canal 12 for the tests.

On 28 May 2012, Canal 12 began broadcasting programming in HD, becoming the first television station in the Argentine interior to broadcast in the format.

On 26 February 2015, the Federal Authority for Audiovisual Communication Services assigned Canal 12 UHF frequency 27 for regular digital terrestrial broadcasting in HD through Resolution 35/2015. By April of that year, Canal 12 was broadcasting on Argentine Digital Terrestrial Television using virtual channel 27.1.

=== Clarín Group regulatory process ===
On 4 November 2013, the Clarín Group submitted a voluntary restructuring plan to the Federal Authority for Audiovisual Communication Services in order to comply with the Audiovisual Communication Services Law. Among other measures, the plan proposed dividing the group into six units. Channel 12 was assigned to Clarín Group, which included Artear, Radio Mitre and 24 cable television licenses previously belonging to Cablevisión.

The plan was approved on 17 February 2014.

In October 2014, however, AFSCA reversed its approval of the voluntary restructuring plan and decided to proceed with a compulsory restructuring process, citing alleged irregularities involving cross-shareholdings among the licensees and units.

On 31 October, federal civil and commercial judge Horacio Alfonso issued a precautionary measure suspending the compulsory restructuring process. On 10 December, a six-month injunction was issued and was renewed for a further six months in June 2015.

On 29 December 2015, Decree 267/2015 amended several provisions of the Audiovisual Communication Services Law.

Following the changes, the Clarín Group was no longer required to divide itself into six units.

In January 2016, Clarín suspended its restructuring plan.

On 2 February, ENACOM, the successor to AFSCA, decided to archive the restructuring plans, including Clarín's. As a result, the Clarín Group was no longer required to divide itself or sell its licenses.

=== Satellite television ===
On 23 October 2020, Channel 12 announced that a special feed of the station containing local programming would be added to the DirecTV satellite television lineup from 26 October. This made it the first television station in the city of Córdoba to join the platform.

== Programming ==
Part of Channel 12's programming consists of programs retransmitted from El Trece in Buenos Aires, the flagship station of the Artear/El Trece network.

The station also produces local programming, including local newscasts such as Arriba Córdoba, Noticiero Doce, Todo Córdoba, Telenoche and Buenas Noches Córdoba.

Other local programs have included Agroverdad, an agricultural program, Deportes en Marcha, a sports program, El Show del Lagarto, a morning magazine program, Seguimos en El Doce, a midday magazine program, De acá para allá, an afternoon magazine program, and Vamos a Jugar, an entertainment program.

== News service ==
Canal 12 operates a news service focusing primarily on local, national and international news.

The station's news programming has included five weekday newscasts: Arriba Córdoba at 7:00, Noticiero Doce at 12:00, Todo Córdoba at 19:00 on the secondary feed, Telenoche at 20:00, and Buenas Noches Córdoba at midnight on the secondary feed.

In 2022, El Doce announced additional locally produced content for multiple platforms, including television, social media and DirecTV.

== Retransmitters ==
Canal 12 has retransmitters throughout Córdoba Province, Catamarca Province, La Rioja Province and San Luis Province. According to the station's public access documentation, it has been authorized to operate 24 retransmitters, although only 19 were recognized as operational at the time of the cited documentation.

=== Córdoba Province ===
Channel	Repeater location
24	Altos de Chipión
54	Arroyito
66	Bell Ville
32	Cerro Colorado
6	Cumbres de Achala
2	Deán Funes
61	Del Campillo
38	Calamuchita Valley (out of service)
50	General Levalle
56	Jovita
52	La Brianza
64	La Francia
37	Las Varas
8	Laboulaye
5	Los Cocos / Punilla Valley
57	Marcos Juárez
35	San Francisco
45	Vicuña Mackenna
59	Villa Carlos Paz (out of service)
38	Villa María

=== Catamarca Province ===
Channel	Repeater location
11	Ancasti
8	Minas Capillitas (out of service)

=== La Rioja Province ===
Channel	Repeater location
11	Chilecito

=== San Luis Province ===
Channel	Repeater location
7	Merlo (out of service)

== See also ==
- Channel 10 Córdoba
- Telefe Córdoba
- Television in Argentina
