= GTO =

GTO may refer to:

== Entertainment ==
- Great Teacher Onizuka, a manga, anime, live-action series, and film
- GameTable Online, a game portal

=== Music bands ===
- GTO (band), an Australian band
- The GTOs, an American girl group
- Giraffe Tongue Orchestra, an American band
- Greater Than One, an English electronic music band

=== Other music uses ===
- GTO: Gangsters Takin' Over, an album by Oran "Juice" Jones
- GTO Records, a British record label
- "GTO" (Ronny & the Daytonas song), 1964
- "GTO" (Sinitta song), 1987
- "GTO", a 2017 song by Europe from the album Walk the Earth

== Science and technology ==
- Gate turn-off thyristor
- Gaussian-type orbital
- Geostationary transfer orbit
- Golgi tendon organ

== Transport ==
- Gorton railway station, in Greater Manchester, England
- Jalaluddin Airport (IATA: GTO) in Gorontalo, Indonesia
- Grand Touring Over, a category for production cars
- Gran Turismo Omologata, a model name of several grand tourer automobiles:
  - Ferrari 250 GTO
  - Ferrari 288 GTO
  - Ferrari 599 GTO
  - Pontiac GTO
  - Mitsubishi 3000GT (Mitsubishi GTO in Japan)
  - Mitsubishi Galant GTO
  - HSV GTO

== Other uses ==
- Geographic targeting order issued by the United States Secretary of Treasury
- Guanajuato, Mexico
- Ready for Labour and Defence of the USSR (Russian: Готов к труду и обороне СССР, Gotov k trudu i oborone SSSR), a Soviet physical training programme
- Game theory optimal — poker strategy calculation
