= Channel 10 (Tucumán, Argentina) =

TV station in Tucumán, Argentina

LW 83 TV Canal 10
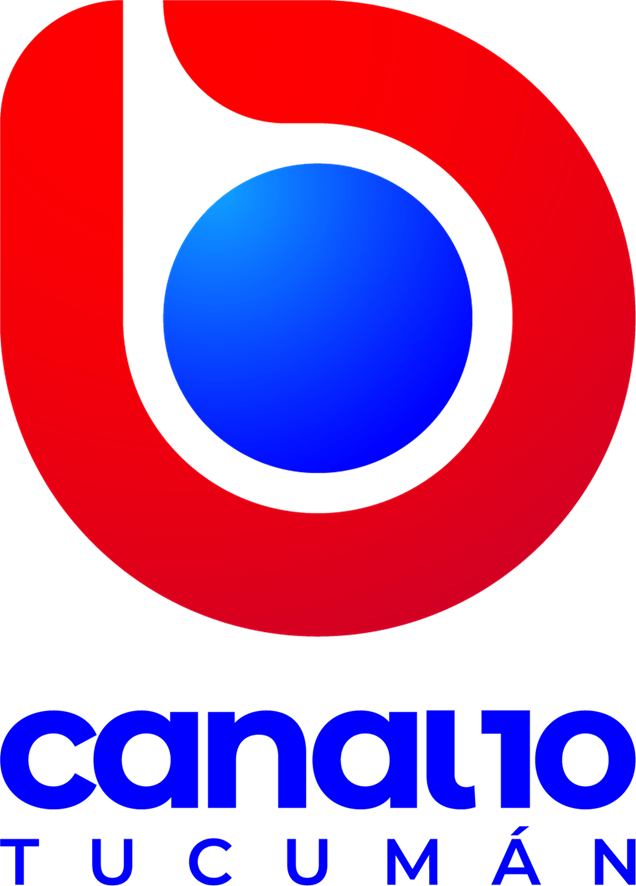
- Tucumán; Argentina
- City: Yerba Buena
- Channels: Analog: 10 (VHF); Digital: 27 (UHF)
- Branding: Canal 10

Programming
- Affiliations: El Trece

Ownership
- Owner: Universidad Nacional de Tucumán Government of Tucumán; (Televisora de Tucumán S.A.P.E.M.)

History
- Founded: July 9, 1966

Technical information
- Licensing authority: ENACOM

Links
- Website: canal10tucuman.com.ar

Canal 10 (call sign LW 83 TV) is one of the two free-to-air channels in the province of Tucumán, Argentina. It is owned and run by the National University of Tucumán. Its headquarters and studios are located in Yerba Buena with transmitter in Villa Nougués.

Channel 10 went on air on July 9, 1966 At first, it began broadcasting cultural programming, but soon it turned into a more commercial station. Color transmission began in 1980, and it remained the only free-to-air channel until 1983 when LRK 458 TV Channel 8 was founded. Since the 1990s, Canal 10 has primarily rebroadcast the national programming of El Trece in Buenos Aires.

== Local programs ==
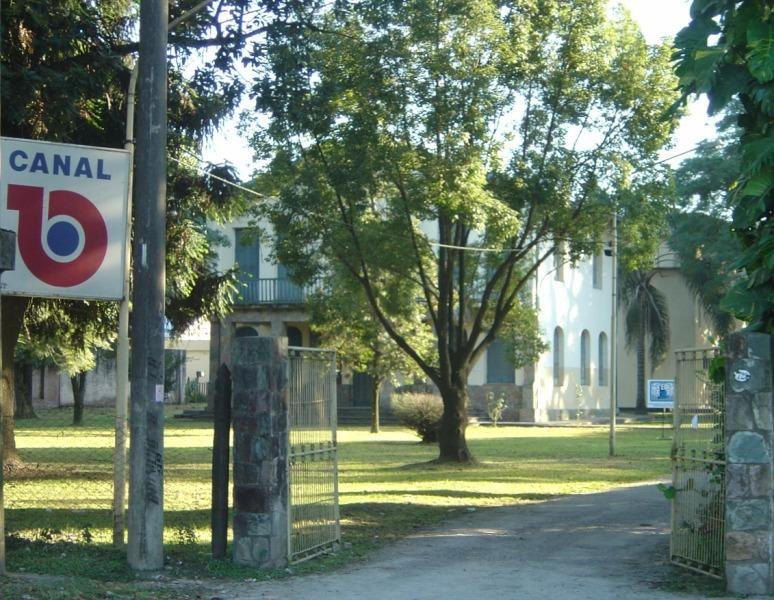
The Canal 10 studios

Current local shows

- La Mañana es Noticia (Morning is News): Mon-Fri from 6:30am to 9:30am
- TV Prensa (News): Mon-Fri at 1:00pm and 9:00pm
- La Santa Misa (Religion): Sundays at 11:00am
- Esto es Noticia (This is News): Saturdays at 8:00pm
- Un Día a la Semana (Miscellaneous): Saturdays at 2:00pm

Local shows featured in the past

- Canal 10 Informa (News)
- Sábados para Todos (Miscellaneous)
- Deportivo 10 (Sports)
- Ciudadanos (Current Affairs)

== Repeaters ==
Canal 10 has repeaters in Choromoro (channel 2), Tafí del Valle (channels 4 and 10), Trancas (channel 5) and San Pedro de Colalao (channel 7).
