= GTO (band) =

- Origin: c 1999
- Genres: industrial-pop
- Years active: c 1999-
- Past members: Matt; Cheyne; Megs; Drew

GTO (previously called WTO) are an Australian band formed in Auckland. Their single, "Superstars of Modern Love", reached #92 on the ARIA Singles chart and was used by Channel 10 for a promo clip.

Guitarists Drew Cain and Megan K were both members of Sydney industrial act Bionic from the early-mid 1990s. This band also featured Martin Kemp on drums and keyboardist Craig Sue. In 1996 Bionic released two EPs, 'stay'; and 'the stink'. The video for 'stay' was played on rage a number of times. Around 1997, Craig Sue left to concentrate on Killers On The Loose, a rave project he shared with Cain; and Genetic, a solo drum&bass project.

The move forced a lineup change, with Cain moving to keyboards, and new guitarist Cheyne coming aboard. Bionic became WTO (World Trash Orchestra), soon to become GTO (Global Trash Orchestra).

1999 saw GTO release the EP Ears Were Made for Bleeding. It featured the songs "Danke Shoen" and "Hatemail".

The band was soon joined by new drummer Matt, and they released the album 'Superstars Of Modern Love' in 2001 and the single of the same name the following year. GTO had been signed to a major label by this time, having previously self-published on their 'Plasma Sonic Productions' label.

== Discography ==
=== Albums ===
List of albums, with selected details
Title	Album details
Superstars of Modern Love	Released: 2001; Format: CD; Label: Plasma Sonic Productions (PLASCD005)

=== Extended plays ===
List of EPs, with selected details
Title	EP details
Ears Were Made for Bleeding	Released: 1999; Format: CD; Label: Plasma Sonic Productions (PLASCD003)
Hate Mail/Danke Shoen	Released: 2000; Format: CD; Label: Plasma Sonic Productions (PLASCD004)

=== Singles ===
List of singles, with selected chart positions
Title	Year	Peak chart positions	Album
Title	Year	AUS	Album
"Superstars of Modern Love"	2001	92	Superstars of Modern Love
