= Festival Iberoamericano de Publicidad =

Festival Iberoamericano de Publicidad was created in 1969 by Alberto Gollán - a pioneer of Argentine Television. The objective of this first Spanish and Portuguese-speaking advertising festival, has been since then, to promote and integrate the communication of the region.

The globalization of the communications and the use of new techniques made the FIAP to widen its spectrum with the creation of new disciplines matching those changes:

Media Innovation, Audiovisual Production Techniques and Interactive and Direct Marketing are the most relevant.

More than 8500 advertisements compete in the Festival, and around 2000 delegates from Ibero-America, United States and Europe participate of the event every year.

The winners of FIAP are included into ABC Show
