= Premios Quiero =

Argentine award show

- Awarded for: Best in Spanish and International music
- Country: Argentina
- Presented by: Quiero música en mi idioma
- First award: 2009
- Website: http://www.qmusica.tv/Premios

The Premios Quiero are awards presented annually by the Argentine television channel Quiero música en mi idioma, dedicated to broadcasting music videos. The awards recognize audiovisual artistic excellence in Spanish-language music through public voting.

Since their inception, the awards have been broadcast as a special television program, typically hosted by two presenters from the channel. Winners are featured in videos expressing their gratitude for the recognition. The statuette is characterized by being an uppercase "Q", representing the logo of the channel that broadcasts the awards, placed on a base featuring a plaque with the name of one of the awarded categories.

== History ==
The first ceremony was broadcast in 2009 in Argentina by the channel Quiero música en mi idioma as a special television program, a format that has continued to the present, with its hosts changing over the years. In its first edition, the winners included Shakira (Best Video of the Year for "Loba" and Best Female Artist for her album Loba), Axel (Best Male Artist for his album Universo), Miranda! (Best Band Video for "Mentía"), No Te Va Gustar (Best Rock Video for "El camino"), Ricardo Arjona (Best Melodic Video for "Sin ti... sin mí"), Carlos Baute and Marta Sánchez (Best Pop Video for "Colgando en tus manos"), Daddy Yankee (Best Urban Video for "Llamado de emergencia") and Gustavo Cerati (Best Vanguard Video for "Déjà vu").

== Ceremonies and main winners ==
No.	Year	Host(s)		Video of the Year	Male Artist Video	Female Artist Video
1st	2009	Bárbara Attias	Juani Martínez	"Loba" – Shakira	Universo – Axel (Note: Only in the first edition was the artist awarded for their studio album.)	Loba – Shakira (Note: Only in the first edition was the artist awarded for their studio album.)
2010	2010	Bárbara Attias	Juani Martínez	"Yerbatero" – Juanes	"Guapa" – Diego Torres	"Loca" – Shakira
2011	2011	Bárbara Attias	Juani Martínez	"Muñeco de Haití" – Babasónicos	"No alcanzan las flores" – Diego Torres	"Ingenua" – Dulce María
2012	2012	Caro Ibarra	Juani Martínez	"¡Corre!" – Jesse & Joy	"Todo mi mundo" – Axel	"En el amor hay que perdonar" – Belinda
2013	2013	Florencia Ventura	Juani Martínez	"Ciudad mágica" – Tan Biónica	"El buzón de tu corazón" – Carlos Baute	"Tú ya no estás" – Coki Ramírez
2014	2014	Florencia Ventura	Juani Martínez	"La luz" – Juanes	"Corazón en la maleta" – Luis Fonsi	"A bailar" – Lali
2015	2015	Florencia Ventura	Juani Martínez	"¿Y qué?" – Axel	"Juntos" – Juanes	"Del otro lado" – Lali
2016	2016	Florencia Ventura	Juani Martínez	"No soy una de esas" – Jesse & Joy and Alejandro Sanz	"Como te extraño" – Abel Pintos	"Soy" – Lali
2017	2017	Uma Saponaro	Cris Vanadía	"Reggaetón lento (Bailemos)" – CNCO	"Que nos animemos" – Axel	"Si tú te vas" – Tini
2018	2018	Caro Ibarra	Cris Vanadía	"Sólo yo" – CNCO	"Mariposa" – Abel Pintos	"1, 2, 3" – Sofía Reyes
2019	2019	Brenda Di Aloy	Cris Vanadía	"22" – Tini and Greeicy	"Cien años" – Abel Pintos	"22" – Tini and Greeicy
2020	2020	Brenda Di Aloy	Cris Vanadía	"Tusa" – Karol G and Nicki Minaj	"Favorito" – Camilo	"High (Remix)" – María Becerra
13th	2021	Brenda Di Aloy	Cris Vanadía	"Vida de rico" – Camilo	"Eres perfecta" – Luciano Pereyra	"Casualidad" – Sofía Reyes
14th	2022	Daiana Quiroz	Germán Oberti	"La bachata" – Manuel Turizo	"Carretera y manta" – Pablo Alborán	"Cuatro veinte" – Emilia
15th	2023	Germán Oberti	Juliana Kawka	"Corazón vacío" – María Becerra	"Mejor que ayer" – Diego Torres	"Corazón vacío" – María Becerra
16th	2024	Germán Oberti	Juliana Kawka	"Hola perdida" – Luck Ra and Khea	"Mi corazón" – Tiago PZK	"Baum baum" – Lali

== Categories ==
The Premios Quiero are presented in a series of categories, which include general awards and others divided by musical genre. Currently, 12 categories are awarded, covering various musical genres as well as the general categories.

=== General ===
- Video of the Year
- Male Artist Video
- Female Artist Video

=== Specific ===
- Best Rock Video
- Best Pop Video
- Best Urban Video
- Best Melodic Video
- Best Party Video
- Best Rap / Trap / Hip Hop Video
- Best Extraordinary Encounter
- Best Musician Influencer
- Best Band Video

=== Special awards ===
In addition to the competitive categories, the channel occasionally presents special awards:

- Best Telenovela Song
- Career Award

=== Discontinued categories ===
- Best Vanguard Video
- Best Director
- Best Reggae Video
- Best Participation in a Video
- Best Video to Fall in Love
- Best Live Video
- Best Choreography
- Best YouTube Channel
- Best At-Home Video

== See also ==
- Premios Gardel
- MTV MIAW Awards
