= Channel 7 (Bahía Blanca, Argentina) =

LU 81 TV Canal 7
- Bahía Blanca, Buenos Aires; Argentina
- Channels: Analog: 7 (VHF); Digital: 28 (UHF)
- Branding: Canal Siete Bahía Blanca

Programming
- Affiliations: El Trece

Ownership
- Owner: Grupo Clarín; (Artear)

History
- First air date: February 4, 1966

Technical information
- Licensing authority: ENACOM
- Translator(s): 4 (Coronel Dorrego)

Links
- Website: www.canalsiete.com.ar

Canal Siete (call sign LU 81 TV) is a television station broadcasting from the city of Altos del Palihue for Bahía Blanca, Buenos Aires, Argentina as an Grupo Clarín by Artear owned and operated station. Built and signed on in February 1966, the station competes with Telefe Bahía Blanca.

== History ==
On October 10, 1963, through Decree 9089, the National Executive Branch awarded the company Telba Teledifusora Bahiense S.A. a license to exploit the frequency of Channel 7 in the city of Bahía Blanca, province of Buenos Aires. The company was made up of 10 partners, among whom were Orlando Gerónimo Arrechea Harriet, Raúl Alejandro Arrechea, Rubén Marcelo De Carli and Avelino César González Martínez.

On February 19, 2024, Channel 7 started digital terrestrial broadcasts using the already assigned physical channel (28.1).

== Local shows ==
- Siete Mundo Magazine - newsmagazine
- Toda la Gente - public affairs
- A Puertas Abiertas - public affairs
- Arquitectura Paisajista - cultural
- Experiencia 4x4 - Offroad
- Fútbol de Liga - Soccer
- Plan de Obra - Buildings
