= Telecommunications in Rwanda =

Telecommunications in Rwanda include radio, television, fixed and mobile telephony, and the Internet. The sector was liberalized in 2001, moving away from a state-dominated market and opening the sector to private participation.

== Regulation ==
Telecommunications policy, regulation, and implementation are led by separate public institutions:

- Policy: The Ministry of ICT and Innovation (MINICT) leads national ICT policy and sector strategy.
- Regulation: The Rwanda Utilities Regulatory Authority (RURA) functions as the industry regulator. Its mandate includes issuing licenses, managing the frequency spectrum, and enforcing compliance. The organization has administrative and financial autonomy, though its board members and Director General are appointed by the government. Members of RURA's Regulatory Board are appointed by presidential order, as provided in its establishing law.
- Implementation: The Rwanda Information Society Authority (RISA) is a public institution established in 2017 that coordinates and implements government ICT programmes and digital infrastructure initiatives, including Smart Rwanda Master Plan projects.

Following liberalization, the market structure changed significantly:

- The insolvent former operator Rwandatel went into liquidation, and its assets, including copper and fibre network infrastructure, were acquired by Liquid Intelligent Technologies (then Liquid Telecom) in 2013.
- As of 2025, the mobile telecommunications market is dominated by two operators, MTN Rwanda and Airtel Rwanda.

== Radio and television ==
- Radio stations:
  - As of September 2024, there are over 34 licensed FM radio stations operating in the country.
  - Major players include the state-owned Radio Rwanda (with 99% national coverage), and private commercial stations such as Radio 10, Flash FM, KT Radio, and Isango Star.
  - International broadcasters such as the BBC World Service (93.9 FM in Kigali) and Voice of America (104.3 FM in Kigali) are available on FM frequencies.
  - Radio remains the primary source of information for the majority of the population. According to the 2022 Census, approximately 82% of agricultural households use radio for information.
- Television stations:
  - The government monopoly on television ended with digital migration. As of 2024, there are multiple private television stations including Flash TV, TV10, Isango Star TV, and Genesis TV, alongside the state-owned Rwanda Television (RTV).
  - Digital Migration: Rwanda completed the transition from analog to digital terrestrial television (DTT) on July 31, 2014, becoming one of the first countries in sub-Saharan Africa to do so.
  - Pay TV: The market is dominated by satellite and DTT pay-TV providers. In 2024, Canal+ held approximately 71% of the active subscriber market share, followed by Star Africa Media (17%) and Tele 10/DStv (11%).
- Television sets:
  - Ownership has risen significantly from negligible levels in the 1990s. The 2022 Census reported that 12% of private households own a television set, with ownership concentrated in urban areas (approx. 33.5% in urban vs 4.4% in rural).

State TV and radio (RBA) continue to reach the largest audiences due to their national infrastructure, but private media consumption is high in Kigali and secondary cities. "Hate media" remains a sensitive historical subject due to the role of Radio Télévision Libre des Mille Collines (RTLM) in the 1994 genocide.

== Telephones ==
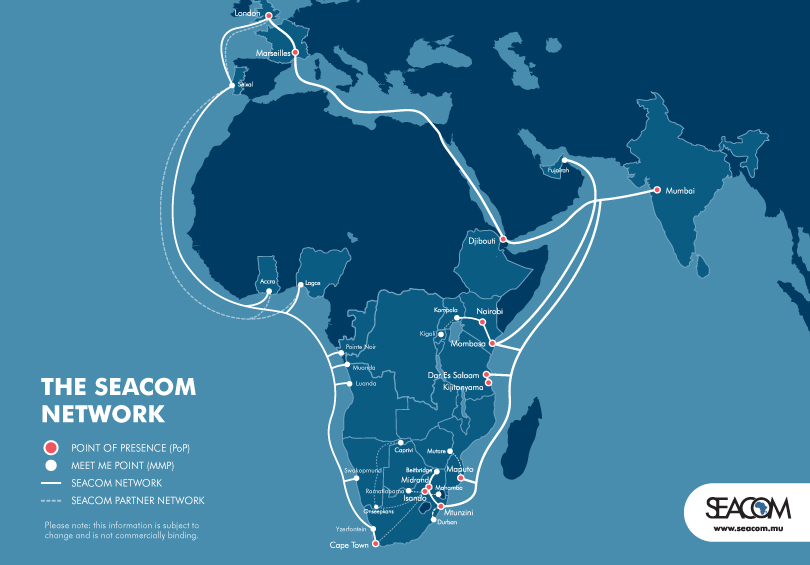
SEACOM-Network Map. Click on map to enlarge.

- Calling code: +250
- International call prefix: 000
- Main lines:
  - 11,215 lines in use, 188th in the world (2019)
  - Fixed lines subscriptions have dropped sharply since 2014
  - Airtel Rwanda controls over 80% of the market
- Mobile cellular:
  - 13.4 million active subscriptions (September 2024).
  - Mobile penetration is approximately 97.8 active SIM cards per 100 inhabitants.
  - The market is a duopoly: MTN Rwanda holds approximately 61.8% of the market, while Airtel Rwanda holds 38.2% (2024).
- Telephone system:
  - A rapidly modernizing system anchored by a national fiber-optic backbone (over 3,000 km) and 4G LTE connectivity.
  - The government-sponsored fiber-optic cable rollout was largely completed by 2011, and 4G LTE coverage now reaches over 97% of the population (2024). 5G services were commercially launched in June 2025.
  - Domestic connectivity relies heavily on the mobile cellular network; fixed-line density is less than 1 telephone per 100 persons.
- Communications cables: landlocked; international connectivity provided via terrestrial fiber links to regional submarine cable landing points, including Eastern Africa Submarine Cable System (EASSy), The East African Marine System (TEAMS), and SEACOM (via Kenya and Tanzania).
- Satellite earth stations:
  - Starlink began operating in Rwanda in February 2023, providing low Earth orbit (LEO) satellite broadband services.
  - Rwanda Space Agency’s Teleport and satellite ground station in Mwulire (Rwamagana District) is intended to support satellite communications and ground-station services (e.g., telemetry, tracking, and command).
  - A commercial ground-station antenna in Mwulire was activated in July 2025 to support space and weather monitoring missions (including COSMIC-2 data delivery for NOAA).

== Internet ==
- Top-level domain: .rw
- Internet users:
  - 5.5 million individual users, ~38% of the population (Mid-2025);
  - 10.1 million active mobile internet subscriptions (2025);
  - 2.65 million users, 21.7% of the population (2018);
  - 450,000 users, 59th in the world (2009);
  - 25,000 users (2002).
- Fixed broadband: 86,173 subscriptions, approx. 120th in the world; 0.6% of the population (2025).
- Wireless broadband: 10.1 million subscriptions, approx. 70% penetration rate (2025).
- Internet hosts: 313,186 hosts (2025).
- IPv4: 314,880 addresses allocated; 22.8 addresses per 1000 people (2025).
- Internet service providers: 2 telecommunication operators (MNOs), 4 Internet service providers (ISPs), 1 wholesaler network service provider, 2 network facility providers, and 23 retail Internet service providers (2025).

Rwanda ranked in first place in Africa for broadband download speeds and 62nd globally with a speed of 7.88 Mbit/s in February 2013.

The Internet has been available from mobile cellular phones since 2007, but the high cost of phones and limited bandwidth restrained its popularity for several years. With completion of the government-sponsored fiber-optic cable expansion project in 2011, telecommunication services throughout the country have improved and the amount of mobile cellular Internet access and use has increased.

In 2009, RURA set up the Rwanda Internet Exchange (RINEX) to connect ISPs and enable the routing of local Internet traffic through a central exchange point without having to pass through international networks. ISPs can also opt to connect via RINEX to the international Internet. As of late 2025, RINEX has grown to approximately 15 connected members, including major content providers and ISPs, a significant increase from just five members in 2013.

Internet access is concentrated in Kigali and other urban areas, and remains beyond the reach of many citizens, particularly in rural areas where low incomes and lower levels of digital literacy continue to limit adoption. Rwanda remains predominantly rural; the 2022 Population and Housing Census reports that 72.1% of the population lives in rural areas. Language barriers also affect effective internet use, as much of the available online content is primarily in English rather than Kinyarwanda.

=== Digital Progress ===
The 2021 UNDP report highlights Rwanda's advancements in incorporating technology in education, specifically aiding students with disabilities. Smart e-learning technology, including smart boards and internet access, has been introduced to support students with visual and hearing impairments.

=== Internet censorship and surveillance ===
Rwanda was rated "partly free" in Freedom on the Net 2013 by Freedom House with a score of 48, somewhat past the midway point between the end of the range for "free" (30) and the start of the range for "not free" (60).

The law does not provide for government restrictions on access to the Internet, but there are reports that the government blocks access to Web sites within the country that are critical of the government.

In 2012 and 2013, some independent online news outlets and opposition blogs were intermittently inaccessible. It is uncertain whether the disruptions are due to government blocking, as was the case in past years, or to technical issues. Some opposition sites continue to be blocked on some ISPs in early 2013, including Umusingi and Inyenyeri News, which were first blocked in 2011. Social-networking sites such as YouTube, Facebook, Twitter, and international blog hosting services are freely available.

The websites of international human rights organizations such as Freedom House, Amnesty International, and Human Rights Watch, as well as the online versions of media outlets such as the BBC, Le Monde, Radio France Internationale, The New York Times, and many others are freely accessible. Websites of national news outlets are also easily accessible. These include the web versions of state-run media and pro-government outlets as well as independent outlets such as The Rwanda Focus, Rushyashya, The Chronicles, Umusanzu, and Rwanda Dispatch.

The constitution provides for freedom of speech and press "in conditions prescribed by the law." The government at times restricts these rights. The government intimidates and arrests journalists who express views that are deemed critical on sensitive topics. Laws prohibit promoting divisionism, genocide ideology, and genocide denial, "spreading rumors aimed at inciting the population to rise against the regime", expressing contempt for the Head of State, other high-level public officials, administrative authorities or other public servants, and slander of foreign and international officials and dignitaries. These acts or expression of these viewpoints sometimes results in arrest, harassment, or intimidation. Numerous journalists practice self-censorship.

In June 2011 a court convicted journalist Jean Bosco Gasasira in absentia of displaying contempt for the head of state and incitement to civil disobedience for his writings in the online publication Umuvugizi and sentenced him to two and a half years in prison.

The constitution and law prohibit arbitrary interference with privacy, family, home, or correspondence; however, there are numerous reports the government monitors homes, telephone calls, e-mail, Internet chat rooms, other private communications, movements, and personal and institutional data. In some cases monitoring has led to detention and interrogation by State security forces (SSF).

== See also ==
- Terrestrial fibre optic cable projects in Rwanda
- Media of Rwanda
