= Channel 10 virtual TV stations in Mexico =

The following television stations operate on virtual channel 10 in Mexico:

== Regional networks ==
- Canal 10 Chiapas in the state of Chiapas
- TV Mar in Baja California Sur and Puerto Vallarta, Jalisco
- Tlaxcala Televisión in the state of Tlaxcala

== Local stations ==
- XHMEE-TDT in Mexicali, Baja California
- XHJUB-TDT (Nu9ve subchannel) in Ciudad Juárez, Chihuahua
- XHTSCO-TDT in Saltillo, Coahuila
- XHA-TDT in Durango, Durango
- XHQMGU-TDT in Guadalajara, Jalisco
- XHTPG-TDT in Tepic, Nayarit
- XHSECE-TDT in Querétaro, Querétaro
- XHCOSL-TDT in Matehuala, San Luis Potosí
- XHSLV-TDT in San Luis Potosí, San Luis Potosí
- XHQ-TDT in Culiacán, Sinaloa
- XHMZ-TDT in Mazatlán, Sinaloa
- XHI-TDT in Ciudad Obregón, Sonora
- XHFW-TDT in Tampico, Tamaulipas
