= Channel 8 (Tucumán, Argentina) =

TV station in San Miguel de Tucumán, Tucumán Province, Argentina

LRK 458 TV Canal 8
- Tucumán; Argentina
- Channels: Analog: 8 (VHF); Digital: 20 (UHF)
- Branding: elochoTV

Programming
- Affiliations: Telefe

Ownership
- Owner: Televisión Litoral S.A.
- Sister stations: eltres TV elseis TV elnueve TV elonce TV

History
- First air date: December 8, 1983
- Former names: TTC Canal 8 (1983-1993); Canal 8 (1993-2018); Telefe Tucumán (2018-2023)

Technical information
- Licensing authority: ENACOM

Links
- Website: www.elocho.tv

elochoTV (call sign LRK 458 TV) is a television station broadcasting on analog channel 8 in San Miguel de Tucumán, the capital of the Argentine province of Tucumán. It carries programs from Telefe and is owned by Grupo Televisión Litoral.

== History ==
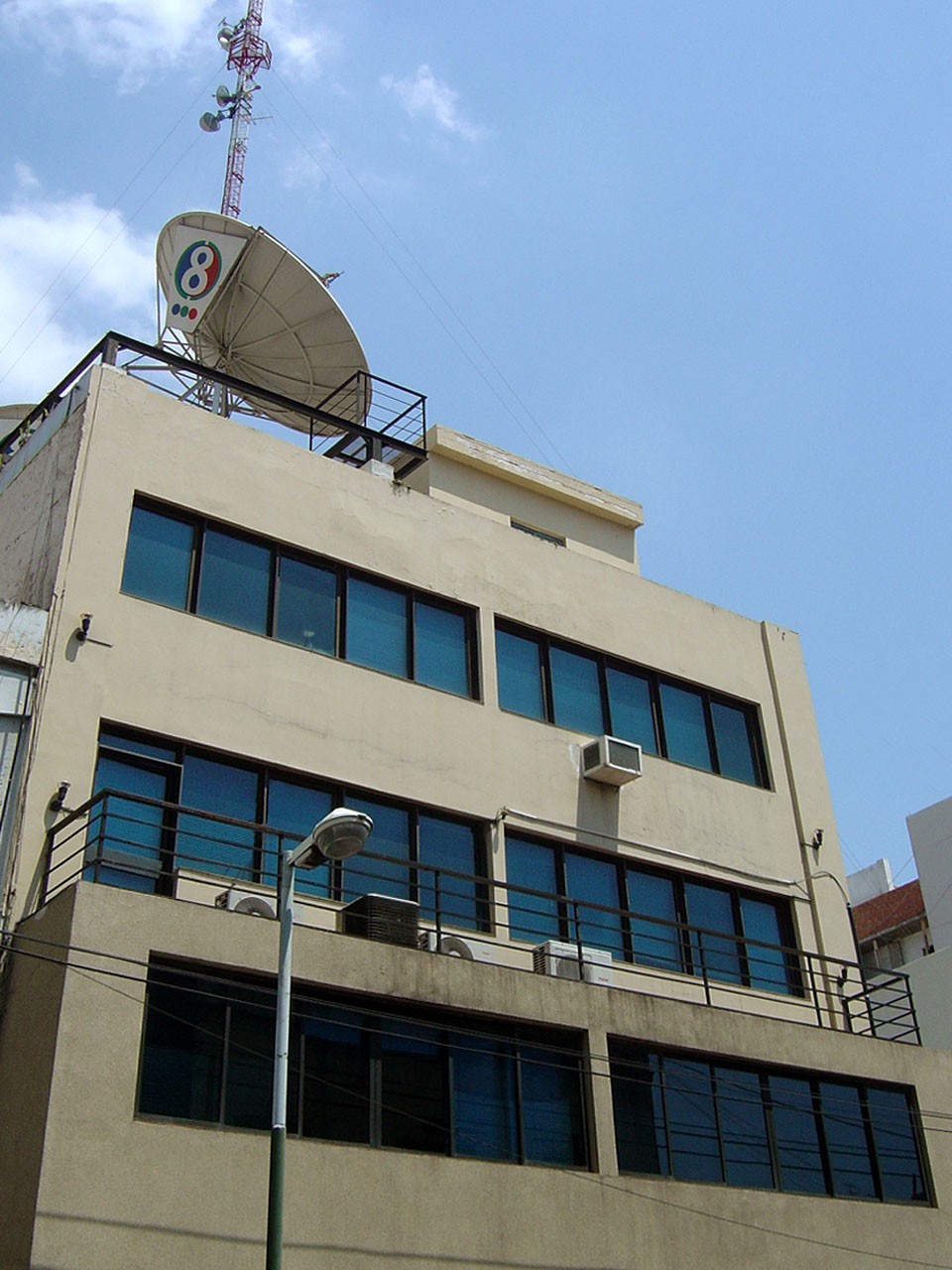
Television studios of elocho TV

Canal 8 signed on in 1983. It was one of the members of the Televisión Federal, S.A., consortium, that acquired the license for channel 11 Buenos Aires when it was privatized in 1989.

In 2018, all of Telefe's stations in interior Argentina dropped their channel number branding to go by "Telefe (city)", including Canal 8, which became Telefe Tucumán; this was done in preparation for the end of analog television.

Telefe sold the Tucumán station to Televisión Litoral, which owns Telefe's rival El Trece's affiliates in Rosario and Bariloche, in 2023. As a result, the station rebranded as "Elocho TV", matching the imaging of the other two stations, on February 1.

=== Local programming ===
Within a few months of beginning transmission, Canal 8 aired its first newscast, called 12 Minutos (12 Minutes). The newscast eventually was changed to a one-hour show, and the name was changed to División Noticias (News Division).

Canal 8 presents music programs such as Conexión Videos, Musica Libre (Free Music), and Elegidos (Elected), which aired from 1987 to 2008.

It has produced series for children and teens such as El Jardín de Florencia Flor (Florencia Flor's Garden), El Payaso Tapalín (The Tapalín Clown), and Tevematch.

Commented Third Time is the first sports show of the channel. Canal 8 was the first channel in the province to air live sporting events.

In the early 1990s the station showed a miniseries set in the Tucumán of the 17th Century called 100 Años Después (100 Years Later).

=== National programming ===
Before the creation of Telefe, Canal 8 was the first channel in the area to rebroadcast news programs from Buenos Aires such as 28 Millones (later called 30 millones), Realidad 84 (Reality 84), Redacción Abierta (Open Drafting), and Buenas Noches Argentina (Good Evening Argentina).
