= Channel 10 (Río Negro, Argentina) =

TV station in Río Negro, Argentina

LU 92 TV Canal 10
- General Roca, Río Negro; Argentina
- Channels: Analog: 10 (VHF)
- Branding: Canal 10

Programming
- Affiliations: El Trece

Ownership
- Owner: Government of Río Negro; (Radio y Televisión de Río Negro S.E.)

History
- Founded: 1982
- First air date: 20 May 1982 (on channel 11)
- Former names: Canal 11 (1982-1985); TV 10 (1985-1989); AireValle (1999-2005); Canal Diez Alto Valle (2005-2008); Canal Diez (2008-2009); El Diez (2011-2014); Televisión Rionegrina (2014-2016)
- Former channel numbers: 11 (analog VHF, 1982-1985)
- Former affiliations: Independent (1982–1998)

Technical information
- Licensing authority: ENACOM

Links
- Website: https://www.diario10.com.ar/

Canal 10 (call sign LU 92 TV) is an Argentine television station located in General Roca, Province of Río Negro. Channel 10 is affiliated with El Trece. The station begins its daily schedule at noon, and offers a variety of shows including news, soap operas, talk shows, comedies and cultural programs. It began operations in 1982 and produces around 20% of its programming.

== History ==
On 13 May 1975, by means of Decree nº 1272, the National Executive Branch gave the Government of Río Negro Province a permit to exploit an "official non-commercial television station" in the city of General Roca.

On 4 August 1981, by means of Resolution 181, the Federal Broadcasting Committee (COMFER) initiated a public contest for the granting of Canal 11's license.

The license started its regular broadcasts on 20 May 1982 as LU 92 TV Canal 11 de General Roca; however, by April 1984, the station had moved to channel 10.
