= Channel 10 TV stations in Canada =

The following television stations broadcast on digital or analog channel 10 in Canada:

== Alberta ==
- CFCN-TV-6 in Drumheller, Alberta

== Nova Scotia ==
- CIMC-TV in Isle Madame, Nova Scotia
- CJCH-TV-1 in Canning, Nova Scotia

== Ontario ==
- CFPL-DT in London, Ontario
- CITO-TV-1 in Kapuskasing, Ontario
- CKNY-TV in North Bay, Ontario

== Quebec ==
- CFEM-DT-1 in Val d'Or, Quebec
- CHAU-DT-3 in Port-Daniel-Gascons, Quebec
- CJPM-TV-1 in Roberval, Quebec

== Saskatchewan ==
- CICC-TV in Yorkton, Saskatchewan
