= Channel 6 (Bariloche, Argentina) =

Television station in San Carlos de Bariloche, Argentina

LU 93 TV Canal 6
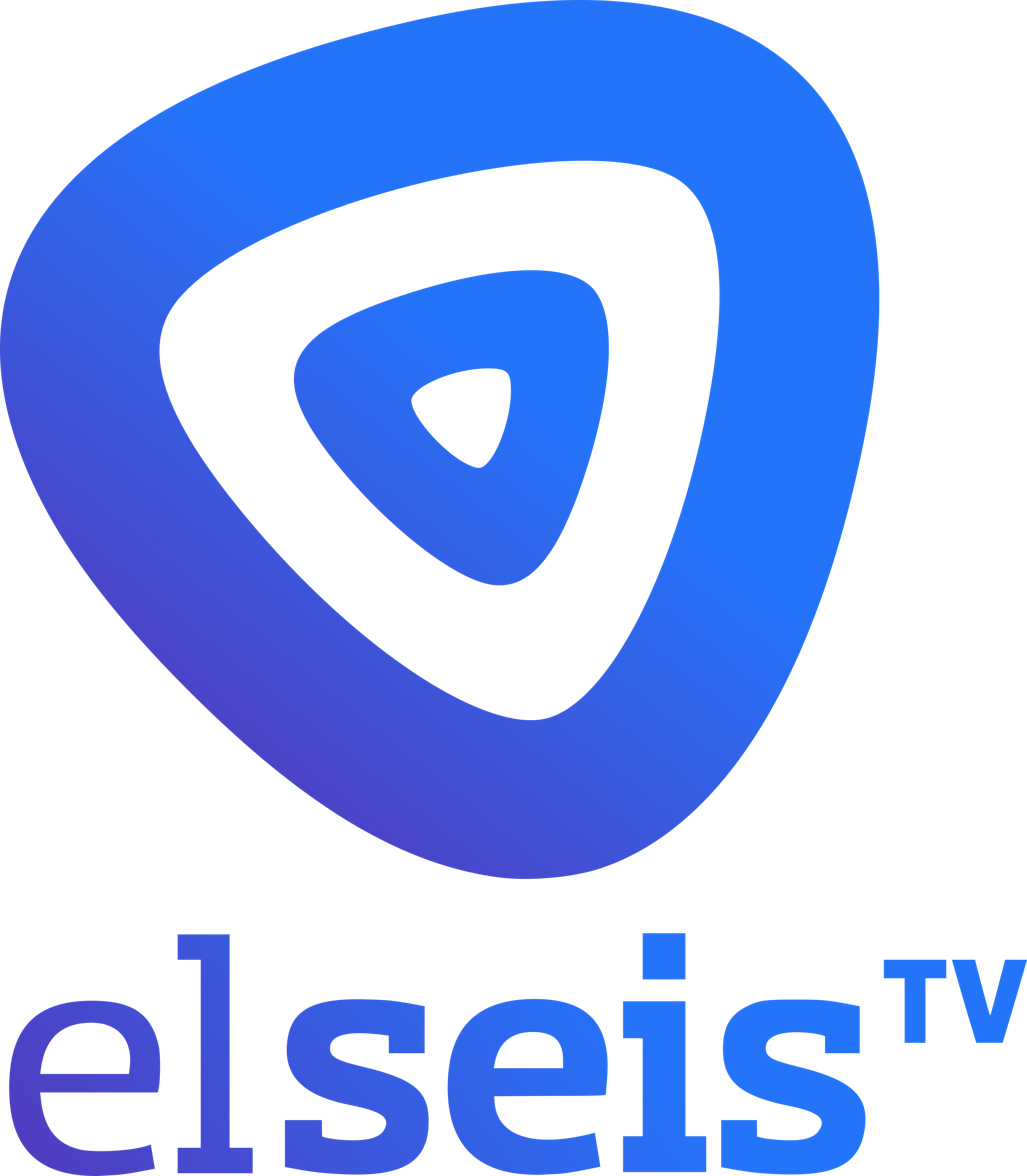

San Carlos de Bariloche, Río Negro; Argentina
- Channels: Analog: 6 (VHF); Digital: 27 (UHF)
- Branding: elseis TV

Programming
- Affiliations: El Trece

Ownership
- Owner: Televisión Litoral S.A.; (Bariloche TV, S.A.)
- Sister stations: eltres TV elocho TV elnueve TV elonce TV

History
- Founded: June 1, 1966, as a cable channel
- First air date: May 1, 1978
- Former names: Canal 3 (1966-1978); Canal 6 Bariloche (1978-2008); Canal Seis (2008-2011); El Seis (2011-2021)
- Former channel numbers: 3 (analog cable VHF, 1966-1978)
- Former affiliations: Telefe (secondary) (?–2002)

Technical information
- Licensing authority: ENACOM

Links
- Website: www.bariloche2000.com

Elseis TV (call sign LU 93 TV) is an Argentine private, over-the-air television station broadcasting from the city of San Carlos de Bariloche, carrying programming from El Trece. It is owned-and-operated by Grupo Televisión Litoral and is the only over-the-air TV station available in this area.

== History ==
The channel's origins date back to 1966 when a closed circuit service on channel 3 started, which was the first television station that existed in Bariloche.

In 1978, the government of the time determined that, in time for the 1978 FIFA World Cup, the station was to be converted to a terrestrial television operation.

Its regular broadcasts started on May 1, 1978 as LU 93 TV Canal 6 de San Carlos de Bariloche.
