= Channel 10 virtual TV stations in Canada =

The following television stations operate on virtual channel 10 in Canada:

- CFEM-DT-1 in Val d'Or, Quebec
- CFPL-DT in London, Ontario
- CFTM-DT in Montreal, Quebec
- CHAU-DT-3 in Port-Daniel-Gascons, Quebec
- CHKL-DT-1 in Penticton, British Columbia
- CITV-DT-1 in Red Deer, Alberta
- CKVU-DT in Vancouver, British Columbia
