= Canal 10 (Spain) =

Defunct Spanish television channel

Channel 10—business name Film Success S. A.— was the first private television station in Spain. Its programming was movies, TV movies, series, entertainment and music. It is the first Spanish station that did not broadcast advertisements and did not interrupt movies. It broadcast for two months free-to-air via satellite before starting to broadcast encrypted. Its broadcasts began in January 1988 and ended in September of the same year. The channel reached 654 subscribers.

== History ==
It started in 1987 when several telecommunications investors came together to start a private network. The lack of a concise law on private television broadcasts meant that these shareholders, with the help of the law firm of José María Calviño —former president of RTVE— found a legal loophole that allowed a kind of legality for the channel. This collaboration involved the participation of Lake Wood Enterprises, Inc. —Panama—, whose representative was Calviño, in the shareholding.

It was broadcast from London using the Intelsat 5 satellite, which at that time was one of the few companies with satellite broadcasts covering Spain. This circumstance took advantage of one of the legal loopholes that would allow Canal 10 to broadcast almost legally. Canal 10 also makes agreements with various community videos – small local pay television networks – to rebroadcast the channel.

Channel 10 began its broadcasts on January 25, 1988 on an experimental basis, continuing regularly the next day with the broadcast of the film Kramer vs. Kramer without commercial breaks for the first time in Spain. Broadcast free-to-air, the channel was receivable with just an analog satellite receiver and a satellite dish facing 1° West.

The free broadcasts stopped on April 8 and its regular programming started on April 24 of the same year. Then the network began a relaunch of the brand, advertising on sports teams (cycling), and advertisements on other television networks. television —TVE 1, TV3, Telemadrid— or even hiring a Hollywood actress like Bo Derek —10, the perfect woman— for the network's advertisements. The registration fee was 15,000 pesetas, while the monthly subscription was 3,500 pesetas. It was only possible to register in large cities—Madrid, Barcelona, Valencia and Bilbao— since it was only in those cities that Canal 10 carried out the —free— installations of the satellite dish and the receiver. The Mateu Cromo printing company, which currently belongs to Grupo Prisa and has been printing its newspapers for years, also printed the channel's magazine.

The few additions meant that in May 1988 the shareholders began to worry about the progress of the canal. The most optimistic predict that in a year or two the channel will reach a stable level of losses, but that does not calm shareholders like CLT, which was already planning a departure of the shareholders in view of a possible competition by the Spanish Government for legal licenses to private stations. In an attempt to retain expenses, Canal 10 transfers the production of the channel from Molinare's team to its own. The problems on the Intelsat satellite, caused by bad stellar weather, did not help either.

It was not enough for Molinare itself—continuity of the channel—to make it impossible for Canal 10 employees to go to work on September 1, causing the network to stop broadcasting to the surprise of subscribers. The next day the network reported that it could not continue, accusing the fact that no income had been generated and the precarious number of subscribers - 654 -. The shareholders intend to send Enrique Talarewitz, manager of the chain, to court for mismanagement; but they do not achieve it because they allegedly have "infiltrated" judges and officials.

On September 18, 1988, Channel 10 filed for bankruptcy, according to Europa Press. The channel's spokesperson denied it, but the reaction of the channel's creditors was immediate. The next day, both Editmedia S. A. and Broadcasting Trade Limited, which provided content to the channel and its production, sued channel 10 for non-payments of 189 million pesetas.

On October 12, the channel's saga ends, after the debt to Channel 10 is raised, the channel's 22 creditors agree to file suspension of payments. This action facilitated a possible reincarnation of the channel, but neither Enrique Talarewitz nor Canal+ France were willing to do so.
