= Channel 10 low-power TV stations in the United States =

The following low-power television stations broadcast on digital or analog channel 10 in the United States:

- K10AC-D in Ashland, Montana
- K10AD-D in Vallecito, Colorado
- K10AH-D in Emigrant, Montana
- K10AP-D in Pateros/Mansfield, Washington
- K10AW-D in Challis, Idaho
- K10BA-D in Orondo, etc., Washington
- K10BD-D in Winthrop-Twisp, Washington
- K10BK-D in Big Sandy, Montana
- K10BU-D in Lund & Preston, Nevada
- K10CG-D in Aztec, New Mexico
- K10DK-D in Malott Wakefield, Washington
- K10DL-D in Tonasket, Washington
- K10DM-D in Riverside, Washington
- K10DT in Huntsville, etc., Utah
- K10FC-D in Dodson, Montana
- K10FQ-D in Big Laramie, etc., Wyoming
- K10GF-D in Miles City, Montana
- K10GT-D in Mina/Luning, Nevada
- K10HL-D in Virginia City, Montana
- K10HO-D in Big Piney, etc., Wyoming
- K10IX-D in Newberry Springs, California
- K10JK-D in Hinsdale, Montana
- K10JW-D in Verdigre, Nebraska
- K10KG-D in Tenakee Springs, Alaska
- K10KH-D in Shageluk, Alaska
- K10KM-D in Cape Girardeau, Missouri
- K10KR-D in Coolin, Idaho
- K10LG-D in Dryden, Washington
- K10LH-D in West Glacier, etc., Montana
- K10LJ-D in Galena, Alaska
- K10LM-D in Laketown, etc., Utah
- K10LQ-D in Manhattan, Nevada
- K10LU-D in Nightmute, Alaska
- K10MA-D in Waunita Hot Springs, Colorado
- K10MG-D in Socorro, New Mexico
- K10MZ-D in Dolores, Colorado
- K10NC-D in Kenai, etc., Alaska
- K10NF-D in Halfway, Oregon
- K10NY-D in Ismay Canyon, Colorado
- K10OD-D in Weber Canyon, Colorado
- K10OG-D in Lompoc, California
- K10PM-D in Breckenridge, Colorado
- K10PN-D in Cedar City, etc., Utah
- K10PR-D in Thomasville, Colorado
- K10PS-D in Pine Ridge, South Dakota
- K10PV-D in Santa Barbara, California
- K10PW-D in Gallup, New Mexico
- K10QH-D in Trout Creek, etc., Montana
- K10QJ-D in Mink Creek, Idaho
- K10QL-D in Abilene, Texas
- K10QR-D in Leamington, Utah
- K10QX-D in Reno, Nevada
- K10QZ-D in Rosebud, etc., Montana
- K10RA-D in Coulee City, Washington
- K10RB-D in Mesa, Colorado
- K10RC-D in Denton, Montana
- K10RF-D in Long Valley Junction, Utah
- K10RG-D in Rural Juab County, Utah
- K10RH-D in Salina & Redmond, Utah
- K10RI-D in Marysvale, Utah
- K10RJ-D in Woodland & Kamas, Utah
- K10RK-D in Blanding/Monticello, Utah
- K10RL-D in East Price, Utah
- K10RN-D in Helper, Utah
- K10RO-D in Roosevelt, etc., Utah
- K10RP-D in Santa Clara, Utah
- K10RS-D in Aspen, Colorado
- K10RT-D in Beaumont, Texas
- K10RU-D in Salinas, California
- K10RV-D in Centerville, Washington
- K10RW-D in Lake Havasu, Arizona
- KGBY-LD in Palm Springs, California
- KHDT-LD in Denver, Colorado
- KHLM-LD in Houston, Texas
- KHPK-LD in De Soto, Texas
- KIIO-LD in Los Angeles, California
- KMCA-LD in Redding, California
- KRVD-LD in Banning, California
- KSAA-LD in San Antonio, Texas
- KUVM-LD in Houston, Texas, uses KHLM-LD's spectrum
- KWHS-LD in Colorado Springs, Colorado
- KXNU-LD in Laredo, Texas
- KZSW-LD in Riverside, California
- W10AD-D in Montreat, North Carolina
- W10AJ-D in Greenville, South Carolina
- W10AK-D in Spruce Pine, North Carolina
- W10AL-D in Cherokee, etc., North Carolina
- W10BG-D in Mayaguez, Puerto Rico
- W10CP-D in Towanda, Pennsylvania
- W10DD-D in San Juan, Puerto Rico
- W10DF-D in Canton, etc., North Carolina
- W10DG-D in Evansville, Indiana
- WFSF-LD in Key West, Florida
- WGOM-LD in Panama City, Florida
- WIRP-LD in Raleigh, North Carolina
- WMVS (DRT) in Milwaukee, Wisconsin
- WSJT-LD in Atlantic City, New Jersey
- WTTD-LD in Hampton, Virginia
- WVUX-LD in Fairmont, West Virginia
- WWCI-CD in Vero Beach, Florida
- WYGN-LD in Berrien Springs, Michigan

The following low-power stations, which are no longer licensed, formerly broadcast on analog or digital channel 10:

- K10AF-D in Troy, Montana
- K10AJ in Howard, Montana
- K10AT in Circle, etc., Montana
- K10AU in North Fork, etc., Montana
- K10AY in Henefer, etc., Utah
- K10AZ in Spring Glen, etc., Utah
- K10BB-D in Ardenvoir, Washington
- K10CH in Mount Pleasant, Utah
- K10CK in Kanarraville, Utah
- K10CL in Scofield, Utah
- K10CT in Sigurd & Salina, Utah
- K10CU in Koosharem, Utah
- K10DD in Roosevelt, etc., Utah
- K10DE in Duchesne, Utah
- K10DF in Coulee City, Washington
- K10EA in Lake City, Colorado
- K10EB in Scipio/Holden, Utah
- K10EQ in Potter Valley, California
- K10ES in Wendover, Utah
- K10FW in Morgan, etc., Utah
- K10FZ in Hopland, California
- K10GP in Verdi, Nevada
- K10HH in Big Springs, Texas
- K10HJ in Kings River, etc., Nevada
- K10HM in St. Regis, Montana
- K10HQ in Smith, Nevada
- K10HX in Garberville, California
- K10IN in Chinle, Arizona
- K10IV in Capitol Reef National, Utah
- K10JB in Peoa/Oakley, Utah
- K10JG in Boulder, Utah
- K10KB-D in Austin, Nevada
- K10KN in Fruitland, Utah
- K10KO in Wanship, Utah
- K10LD-D in Dillingham, Alaska
- K10LL in Pipe Creek, etc., Montana
- K10LR in Brookings, Oregon
- K10MB in Girdwood, Alaska
- K10MI in McKinley Park, Alaska
- K10MT in Chickaloon, Alaska
- K10OB in Delta Junction, Alaska
- K10OX in Logan, Utah
- K10PL-D in Victoria, Texas
- K10RM-D in Kingman, Arizona
- KBBA-LP in Lake Havasu City, Arizona
- KBNB-LD in San Antonio, Texas
- KNEE-LD in Malaga, etc., Washington
- KRDJ-LD in Lubbock, Texas
- KRYD-LP in Vail, Colorado
- KWKM-LP in Show Low, Arizona
- W10BM in Morehead, Kentucky
- W10CM in Hilliard, Florida
- WBPN-LP in Morris, New York
- WGVI-LP in Hattiesburg, Mississippi
- WNXY-LD in New York, New York
- WXFL-LD in Florence, etc., Alabama
