= The New Times (Rwanda) =

Newspaper in Rwanda

- Typical New Times front page
- Type: Daily newspaper
- Format: Broadsheet
- Editor-in-chief: James Munyaneza
- Founded: September 1995; 31 years ago
- Headquarters: M&M Plaza, Kigali, Rwanda
- Website: www.newtimes.co.rw

The New Times is a national English-language newspaper in Rwanda. It was established in 1995 shortly after the genocide against the Tutsi. A Kinyarwanda-language weekly called Izuba Rirashe was previously published.

The New Times is published in Kigali from Monday to Saturday, with its sister paper the Sunday Times, appearing on Sundays. The New Times Online was launched in 2006. The New Times often conveys optimistic stories about events in Rwanda. It has been described as "the Rwandan government’s newspaper of record".

In May 2009, Human Rights Watch (HRW) described The New Times as a state-owned newspaper in a rebuttal to an editorial article that accused HRW of "sanitizing people who were attempting to negate the 1994 genocide in Rwanda". The New Times did not publish the HRW rebuttal. In 2010, president Paul Kagame said that The New Times has been too servile to him and his party, and asked the Aga Khan to launch an alternative.
