= XHSLV-TDT =

Television station in San Luis Potosí, San Luis Potosí, Mexico

- San Luis Potosí, San Luis Potosí; Mexico
- Channels: Digital: 29 (UHF); Virtual: 10
- Branding: Canal 7

Ownership
- Owner: Comunicación 2000, S.A. de C.V.

History
- Founded: 1994
- Former channel numbers: 7 (analog and digital virtual, 1994–2016)

Technical information
- ERP: 50.6 kW
- Transmitter coordinates: 22°03′57″N 100°57′09″W
- Translator(s): XHCOSL-TDT 33 (VC 10) Matehuala (60 kW)

Links
- Website: canal7slp.tv

XHSLV-TDT (channel 10) is a television station in San Luis Potosí, San Luis Potosí. XHSLV broadcasts on virtual channel 10 (physical channel 29) and is currently an independent station branded as Canal 7. A repeater, XHCOSL-TDT in Matehuala, expands XHSLV's coverage to more than 110,000 additional people in the northern region of the state.

== History ==
XHSLV received its concession on June 29, 1994. Comunicación 2000 was selected in 1991 as the winner from among 11 applicants for the channel.

In 2016, XHSLV was displaced from its longtime channel 7 home by national virtual channel standardization which awarded that channel to Azteca 7. XHSLV moved its programming to virtual channel 10 but continued to brand as Canal 7.

For most of its history, XHSLV maintained a partnership with Televisa; while it carried programming from Gala TV, only 33 percent of its programming in 2014 came from the company, allowing it to avoid being included in the "preponderant economic agent" in broadcasting for regulatory purposes. Televisa programming was removed from XHSLV in 2018 after the company multiplexed Gala TV on its own transmitter in San Luis Potosí.

In 2017, Comunicación 2000 participated in the IFT-6 television station auction and won a new TV station for Matehuala, XHCOSL-TDT (RF channel 33). The new station was secured with a winning bid of 2,795,000 pesos.

== Programming ==
XHSLV airs and produces a significant amount of local programming, particularly its Noticieros Canal 7 newscasts. XHSLV's news department also produces and airs a morning radio newscast heard on XHAWD-FM 107.1. Other programs include cooking shows, fitness programming, automotive and sports shows.

== Digital subchannel ==
XHSLV's second digital subchannel, approved in 2017, offers a time-delay feed of the 10.1 subchannel.
