= Todo Noticias =

Argentine news television channel and website

- Second variant of the 2012 logo, used since 2016
- Country: Argentina
- Broadcast area: Latin America; International
- Headquarters: 1160 San Juan Avenue/Lima 1261 Constitución, City of Buenos Aires

Programming
- Language: Spanish (Rioplatense dialect)
- Picture format: 1080i HDTV (downscaled to 576i/480i for the SD feed)

Ownership
- Owner: Clarín Group
- Parent: Arte Radiotelevisivo Argentino S.A.

History
- Launched: 1 June 1993; 33 years ago

Links
- Website: tn.com.ar

Availability

Streaming media
- Sling TV (United States): Internet Protocol television

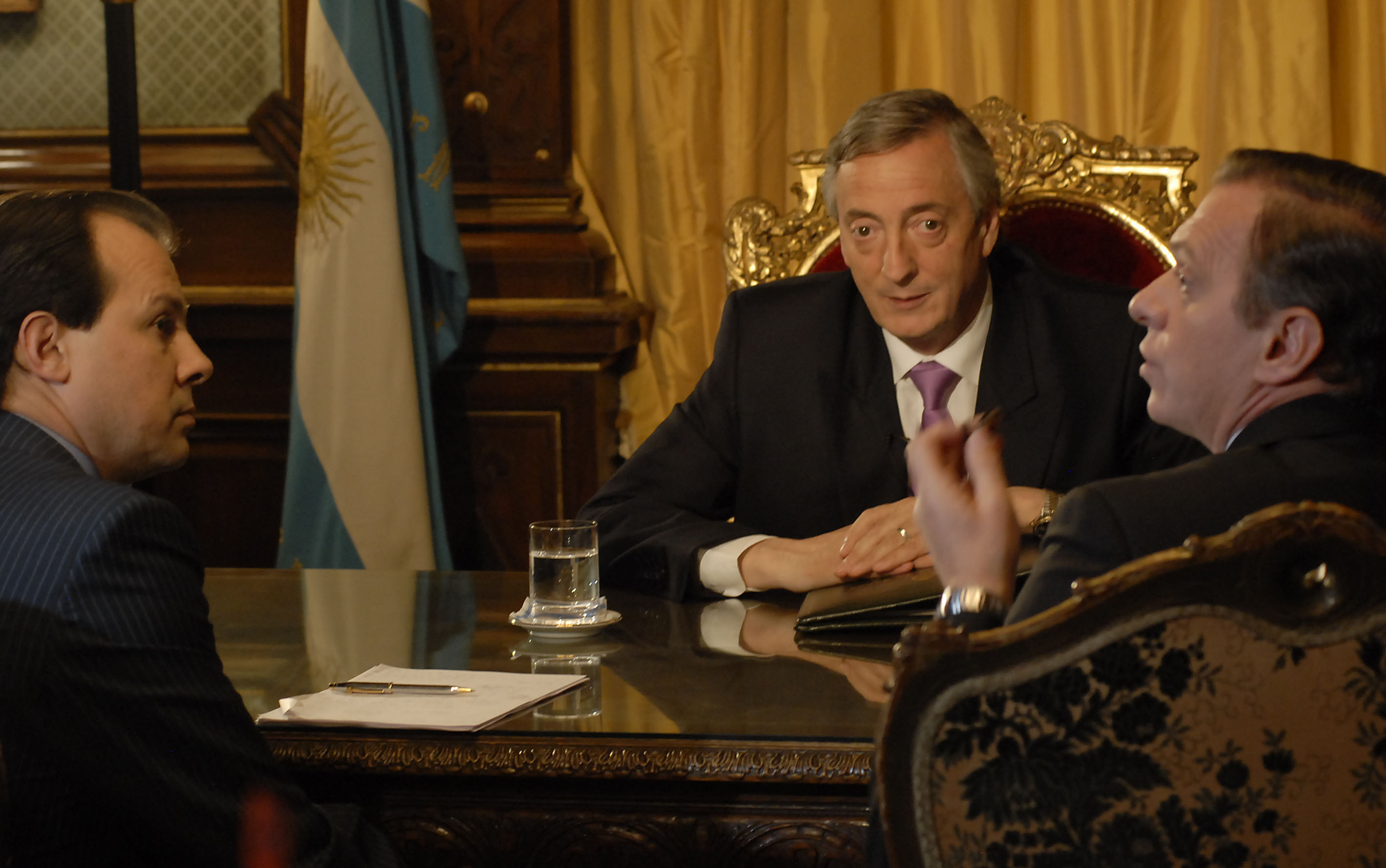
President Néstor Kirchner was interviewed on the television news program A Dos Voces by Gustavo Sylvestre and Marcelo Bonelli in 2007.

Todo Noticias (lit. 'All News') (also known as TN) is an Argentine pay and streaming news television channel owned by the Clarín Group and its subsidiary, Artear. The channel began broadcasting on 1 June 1993, at 7:00 AM local time. TN also has a news website, ranked as the 20th most visited in Argentina according to Alexa. According to IBOPE, it is Argentina's most watched news channel, surpassing La Nación + and C5N.

On 26 November 2012, the station completely relaunched, revamping its institutional image and studios. It did so during the broadcast of a special program from 7:00 AM to 10:00 PM with several of its prominent presenters in various locations across the country.

In April 2013, TN set a record in history: it reached 6 million unique users, ranking as the fourth most-visited news media in Argentina. The same year on 5 August, it launched a streamlined version called "TN Re-evolution".

== Logos ==
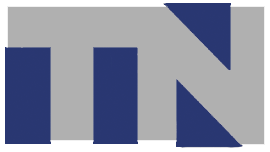
1993–1996

1996–2012

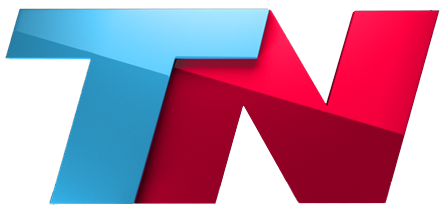
2012–2016

2016–present
