= Alberto Gollán =

Argentine media businessperson

Alberto Gollán (born February 24, 1918 – November 24, 2014 ) was an Argentine media businessman from Rosario, province of Santa Fe. He was the head of Televisión Litoral S.A., the largest media conglomerate in Argentina outside Buenos Aires, which includes the local TV channel Canal 3, and the radio stations LT2 (Radio Dos), FM Vida, and Radio Cataratas. Gollán started Televisión Litoral S.A. in 1965.

Gollán was the mayor of Rosario for four months, between 18 May and 23 September 1971, during the military dictatorship presided by Alejandro Agustín Lanusse.

After the coup d'état of 1976 that deposed Isabel Perón and started the Proceso de Reorganización Nacional, he continued to support the military government. In a reception held on 28 December 1976 in the Officers' Mess, Gollán spoke to Commander of the 2nd Army Corps Leopoldo Galtieri in the name of the press: "We are proud to be able to stand by you and the force you represent in the task you are undertaking. We the journalists will always support this labor."

Through Televisión Litoral, Gollán started in 1977 the Ibero-American Advertising Festival (Festival Iberoamericano de Publicidad, or FIAP), which has continued to be celebrated annually, with the participation of producers from Spain, Portugal and several Latin American countries.

On 15 March 2005 Gollán was awarded an honorary membership of the Order of the British Empire, which was delivered by British Ambassador John Hughes, "for his service, because he is a friend of the British Embassy and visitors". Gollán is the First Vice-Deacon of the Consular Corps of Rosario and the Honorary Consul of the United Kingdom.
