= Ciudad Magazine =

Argentine television channel

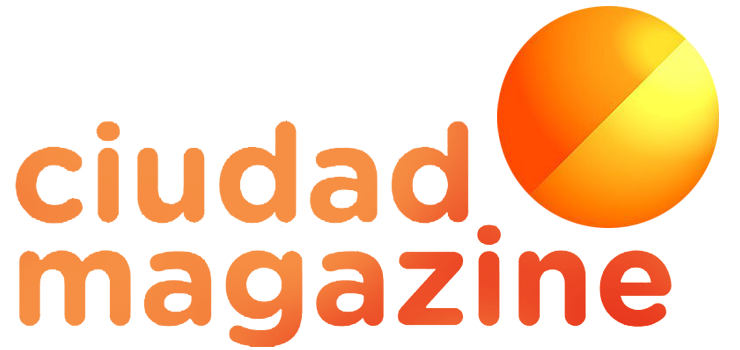
- Type: Pay television channel

Programming
- Language: Spanish
- Picture format: HDTV 1080i

Ownership
- Owner: Grupo Clarín
- Parent: Artear

History
- Launched: January 9, 1995
- Former names: Magazine (1995–1998)

Links
- Website: ciudad.com.ar

Ciudad Magazine is an Argentine cable television channel owned and operated by Grupo Clarín from Buenos Aires. It can be accessed throughout the country via subscription television.

== Programming ==
Magazine produces several programmes, mostly outdoor and gossip shows. It also carries inexpensive syndicated programming, mainly old cartoons, telenovelas soap, series and movies.

=== Exclusive productions ===
- Informadisimos
- Chimentero 3.0
- BDV

=== Independent productions ===
- El mundo de la CONMEBOL
- Yes
- Donna Moda

=== Telenovelas ===
- Colombia: La quiero a morir
- Mexico: Lo Que La Vida Me Robó
- Mexico: Rosalinda
- Colombia: Pasión de gavilanes
- Mexico: La rosa de Guadalupe
