= ABC Show =

Advertising festival

- ABC Show logo

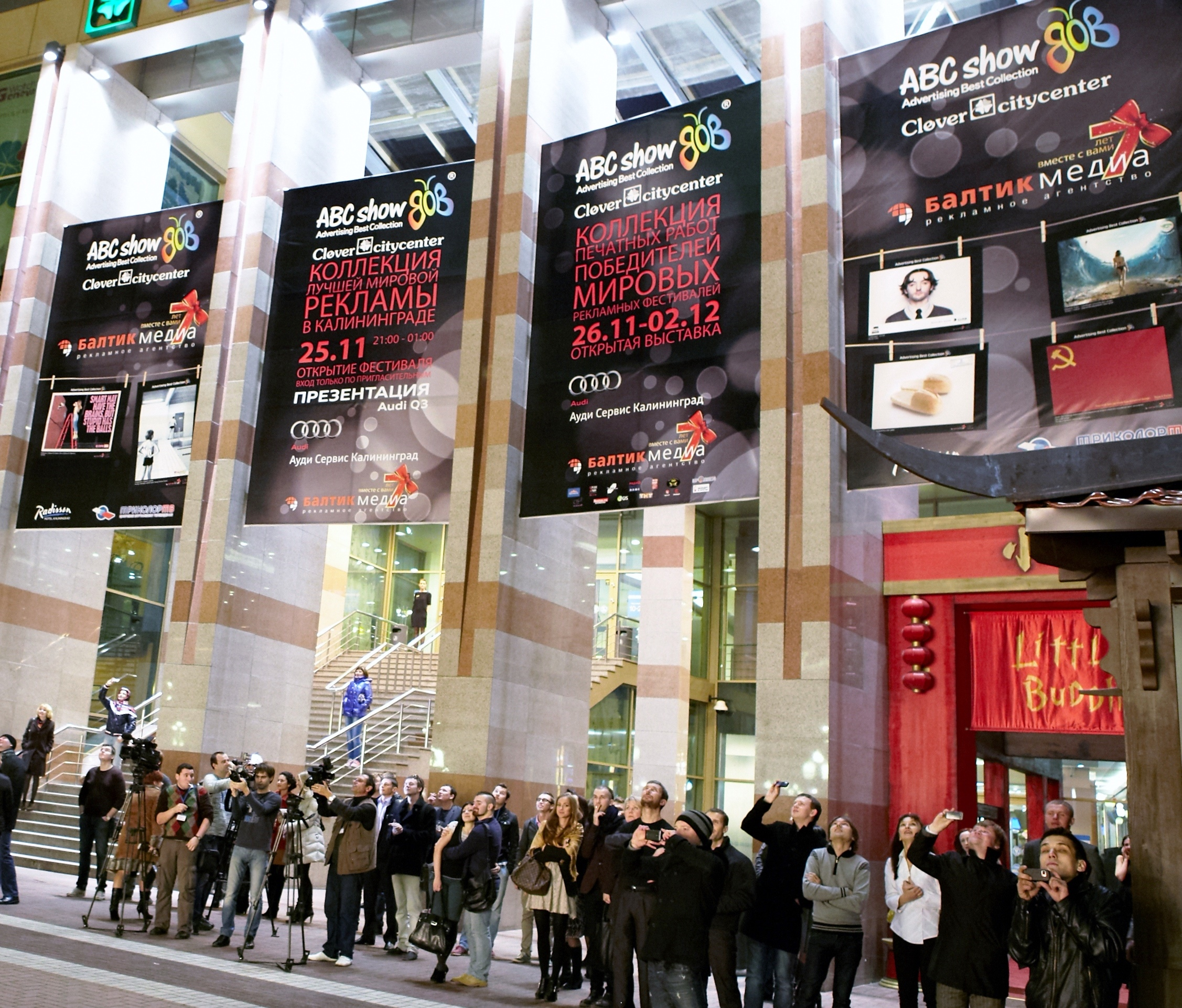
- Fireworks show in Kaliningrad after ABC Show
- Status: Active
- Genre: Advertising festival
- Frequency: Annually
- Country: Russia
- Inaugurated: 2002
- Founder: Ivan Churilin
- Website: Official website

ABC Show (Advertising Best Collection) is an advertising festival which demonstrates the collection of most awarded commercials and prints of the leading international advertising awards.

== Description ==
ABC Show was established on 6 November 2002 by Ivan Churilin, and since that time has experienced rapid growth. It includes the most awarded commercials and prints from the leading international advertising awards. All commercials and prints are translated into Russian, voiced by both male and female actors. Annually the show is opened by the representatives of international festivals – in 2013 the show was opened by Philip Thomas, the chief executive officer of Cannes Liones.

The founder of ABC Show, Ivan Churilin, is an official representative of the Gunn Report in Russia, One Show (New York City), and a member of the jury of New York Festivals (New York) and Mobius Awards (Los Angeles).

== Geography of ABC Show ==
ABC Show has taken place in more than 50 cities of Russia and CIS. Its geography extends from Kaliningrad in the west to Petropavlovsk-Kamchatsky in the east, and from Norilsk in the north to Krasnodar in the south.
