= Goar Mestre =

- Born: Goar Mestre Espinosa; December 25, 1912; Santiago de Cuba, Cuba
- Died: March 23, 1994 (aged 81); Buenos Aires, Argentina
- Citizenship: Cuban; Argentine
- Occupation: Businessman
- Spouse: Alicia Martín (m. 1940–94)
- Children: 4
- Awards: Founders Award

Goar Mestre Espinosa (born December 25, 1912 – March 23, 1994) was a Cuban-born Argentine businessman, remembered as one of the pioneers of the audiovisual industry in Latin America.

After graduation from Yale University, Mestre returned to Cuba and became the local representative for foreign brands such as Jell-O and Kolynos. Dissatisfied with local commercials, he entered the radio business in 1942 and television in 1952. Mestre owned several broadcasters, led by CMQ, the world's first television network to serve a country's entire population. After the Cuban Revolution expropriated CMQ, he moved to television in Argentina, founding Proartel and Channel 13.

== Death ==
Goar Mestre died on March 23, 1994, at the age of 81. His wife Alicia Martín, whom he married in 1940 and had four children and 12 grandchildren, died a week later.
