= La Nueva Provincia =

La Nueva SRL
- Type: Three times per week newspaper
- Publisher: Gustavo Elias
- Founded: 1898
- Political alignment: Conservatism
- Headquarters: Bahía Blanca
- Circulation: 16,000
- Website: La Nueva

La Nueva is a local newspaper published in Bahía Blanca, Argentina.

== History ==
The daily newspaper was founded by Enrique Julio on August 1, 1898. Closely associated with the nation's agricultural interests, it was closed by President Juan Perón in 1950. A coup against the Perón regime in 1955 led to its reopening, with Diana Julio de Massot, the founder's granddaughter, becoming its director.

La Nueva Provincia acquired LU2 Radio Bahía Blanca in 1958 as part of the Aramburu regime's divestiture of media outlets nationalized by Perón. The publication supported President Arturo Frondizi's policy of developmentalism during the early 1960s, but afterwards became known for its endorsement of the country's military coups, supporting both the 1966 and 1976 coups.

The group ventured into cable television in 1986 with the launch of Cable Total, and later formed part of the Telefé board. Massot died in August 2009, and was succeeded by her son.

La Nueva was acquired by a business investor group in January 2017.
