= TV10 (Rwanda) =

Rwandan television channel

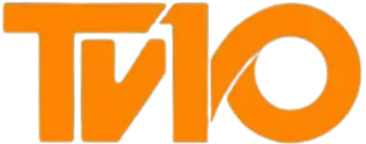
- Country: Rwanda
- Broadcast area: National
- Headquarters: Kigali

Programming
- Languages: English and Kinyarwanda

Ownership
- Owner: RADIOTV10

History
- Launched: March 1, 2013 (12 years ago)

Links
- Website: https://radiotv10.rw/tvpage/

TV10 is a Rwandan commercial television network. Owned by RADIOTV10, it is the first private television station, breaking Rwanda Television's 20-year monopoly.

== History ==
The Rwandan government decided in March 2012 to open the television market to new players. The first licenses were held to telecommunications company Tele 10 and Family TV.

The government inspected TV10's studios in January and was given the go ahead. On 1 March 2013, TV10 started broadcasting. From the beginning, TV10 was meant to be a digital television station, ahead of the initial date of the analog switch-off, 17 June 2015. The station, owned by Tele 10, shared the Simply Rwandaful tagline used by its sister station Radio 10, the first commercial radio station in Rwanda.

In its first year, TV10 appointed Joseph Oindo to host Rwanda's first live music show on television.

In 2022, TV10 was tasked to produce a pop-up channel for DStv, Kwibuka 28, from 7 to 13 April, 28 years after the start of the Rwandan genocide. On 5 April 2023, TV10 was finally made available on DStv.
