= Channel 10 (Córdoba, Argentina) =

TV station in Córdoba, Argentina

LV 80 TV Canal 10
- Córdoba; Argentina
- City: Córdoba, Argentina
- Channels: Analog: 10 (VHF); Digital: 30 (UHF)
- Branding: Canal 10

Programming
- Affiliations: Televisión Pública (secondary)

Ownership
- Owner: National University of Córdoba; (Multimedio SRT)

History
- First air date: 11 May 1962
- Former affiliations: Canal Nueve (until 2009)

Technical information
- Licensing authority: ENACOM

Links
- Website: www.cba24n.com.ar/canal-10-cordoba

Canal 10 (call sign LV 80 TV) is an Argentine television station located in the province of Córdoba. Channel 10 began broadcasting on May 11, 1962.

The station is operated by the National University of Córdoba and currently carries an independent format, plus some local shows and programs from national public broadcaster Televisión Pública, Pakapaka and Encuentro.

== History ==
On April 23, 1958, through Decree Law 5357, the National Executive Branch (at that time headed by the military Pedro Aramburu within the self-titled Liberating Revolution) transferred the assets of LW1 Radio Universidad to the National University of Córdoba to operate a television station in the city of Córdoba, capital of the homonymous province. One of the initiators of the future programming would be the journalist Marcelo Lezama, who formed a team of producers with Caballero Bonorino. Later, they were later joined by filmmaker Guillermo López, as well as Miguel "Cachoíto" De Lorenzi, cameramen, technicians, set designers and journalists.

== Local Productions ==
Contains its own newscasts with 4 editions: ID: Información Diaria (Pre-Newscast from 6:00 to 7:00), Agrodiario TV (industrial newscast from 7:00 to 8:00), Sala Puntual (a theatrical program about actors who try to create a character and a play) (from 9:00 to 10:00), ¡Vamos Chicos! (a children's program about animated series that kids can try to watch now) (from 10:00 to 11:00), Recreo en Casa (after-school morning break program) (from 11:00 to 12:00),¡El Show de las 12 del Mediodía: De Mucha Diversión con Todo! (from 12:00 to 13:00) A relaxed magazine where there is a lot of joy and a crazy party with music and lots of games. Estamos de 10 (Midday News Magazine from 1:00 p.m. to 2:30 p.m.), InformaDiez (central evening news at 8:00 PM), ¡Más 10 que Nunca! (Late Night Show Magazine Informative of the events of the day that flew by from 12am to 1am)
