= El Trece =

Argentine broadcast television network

El Trece (LS 85 TV Canal 13)
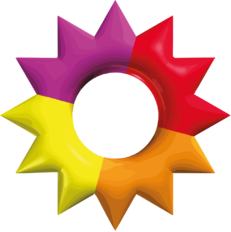
- Logo used since 2008
- Buenos Aires; Argentina
- Channels: Analog: 13 (VHF); Digital: 33 (UHF)
- Branding: El Trece

Programming
- Language: Spanish

Ownership
- Owner: Grupo Clarín; (Arte Radiotelevisivo Argentino S.A.)

History
- Founded: 1958
- First air date: October 1, 1960

Technical information
- Licensing authority: ENACOM

Links
- Website: eltrecetv.com.ar

Channel 13 (known by its current brand name El Trece, stylized as eltrece) is an Argentine free-to-air television network and the flagship station of the network of the same name, located in the capital of Argentina, Buenos Aires. It is owned by Artear, a unit of Grupo Clarín.

As mentioned by its name, it broadcasts on VHF channel 13 and on digital UHF channel 33 in Greater Buenos Aires. Outside of Greater Buenos Aires, the channel is available nationwide via cable and satellite and its programs are rebroadcast by two stations owned by Artear, El Doce in Cordoba and Canal Siete in Bahia Blanca alongside five stations commercially represented by Artear alongside three station carrying El Trece independently.

== History ==
=== Foundation ===
Canal 13 was founded in 1960, and started broadcasting on 1 October 1960, at 8:30 p.m. The channel was tendered to the company Rio de la Plata S.A. TV, founded by Cuban businessman Goar Mestre and the US network CBS. The channel was operated by Goar's company PROARTEL. In the mid-1960s, Editorial Atlántida and Mestre's wife bought the shares of the channel. Since then, Channel 13 began to compete strongly with the other two open private channels of the city of Buenos Aires, Channel 9 and Channel 11, which had gone through a similar process (operation of a television station and association with a major US network).

In those years there were great successes in the Argentine television industry, with Channel 13 broadcasting Viendo a Biondi ("Seeing Biondi"), a comedy show centered on characters by Pepe Biondi; The Falcón Family starring Pedro Quartucci, and sketch comedy shows such as Telecataplum, featuring an innovative group of Uruguayan comedians including Ricardo Espalter, Enrique Almada and Gabriela Acher, among others.

On 2 June 1971, at 2:30 in the morning, after the closure of the usual broadcasts, Canal 13 broadcast a program in color (experimental manner), still images of paintings and landscapes, a polychromatic studio and a motionless person, sitting in an armchair.

=== Nationalization ===
In 1974, the government of Isabel Perón nationalized the station along with two other terrestrial private TV channels of Buenos Aires (Channel 9 and Channel 11), in order to bring a media policy based on the European (and possibly RTVE's) way, where television was largely managed by the federal government.

During the self-styled National Reorganisation Process, the last military dictatorship that ruled the country from 1976 to 1983, the channel's administration was handed over to the Argentine Navy, a condition maintained until 1983, when democratic rule was restored. However, the network continued under public administration, as it had been since the Perón years. The Navy helped the station in its transition to color broadcasts on Labor Day, 1 May 1980, just over a year after Channel 7's switch.

On 2 July 1980, the Channel 13 broadcast studios burned only partly, with no casualties among its workers.

=== Privatization ===
After 15 years as a government-owned station, in December 1989, Arte Radiotelevisivo Argentino (Artear) S.A (English: Argentine Radio and Television Arts), a company with majority ownership by Artes Gráfico Editorial Argentino S.A (AGEA, English: Argentine Publishing Graphics and Arts), publisher of the Clarín newspaper and part of its multimedia conglomerate, officially took over the station management.

Since then, the channel is positioned as second placer in TV ratings in Buenos Aires, competing against Telefe (excluding the 2010-2011 period when it became the ratings leader). In the 1990s, El Trece achieved great ratings, thanks to political comedy programs Tato Bores, programs of cultural and La aventura del hombre, TV series La Banda del Golden Rocket, Montaña Rusa, Gasoleros and the series Campeones de la vida and Poliladron.

Since 1996, the channel operated with Pol-ka Producciones, owned by actor and producer Adrian Suar, who in 2001 became program manager of the channel.

The channel began test broadcasts in HD with its broadcasts of 2000 Today on New Year's Eve 1999, fitted with local opt-outs aired live from various Argentine tourist sites.

=== 2000s ===
In 2000, its brand name was changed to Canal Trece (literally Channel Thirteen).

In 2002, the network started a new trend, which consisted on renewing its aesthetic graphical package every year.

During the 2000s, Channel 13 remained in second place on TV ratings.

In December 2005, Artear bought 30% of shares from Ideas del Sur.

In January 2009, the channel rebranded itself with another graphical package, but kept its logo. In April of that year, after several failed attempts, Channel 13 launched its own international channel (El Trece Internacional), which is broadcast in over 20 countries via subscription television. Between 24 and 26 March and 5 May 2009, Artear's satellite feeds (which included Channel 13's satellite feed, El Trece Satelital) suffered unusual interferences. Although the opposition lawmakers blamed the Cristina Fernandez left-wing administration, the anomalies were finally determined to be caused by a Mexican broadcasting company.

=== 2010s ===
In 2010 and 2011, El Trece managed to defeat Telefe (and, in the process, rank first) in the general audience average, a situation that had not happened in 20 years, driven largely by the high audience of the reality show Showmatch, added to the outstanding performance of Telenoche, the daily shows Malparida, Los únicos y Herederos de una venganza, entertainment programs Sábado show, La cocina del show and A todo o nada and the fourth season of Este es el show. In 2012 the station returned to second place (behind Telefe, but still far ahead of El Nueve and América TV), remaining in that position as of 2021.

From 2010 to 2014, the channel's highlighted programs were telenovelas Malparida, Herederos de una venganza, Los Únicos, Sos mi hombre, Solamente vos, Farsantes and Guapas, TV shows Para vestir santos, El puntero and Tiempos compulsivos, entertainment programs and newscasts like Showmatch, Este es el show, Sábado show, El diario de Mariana, Periodismo para todos, A todo o nada and Los 8 escalones and its reality shows Soñando por bailar, Soñando por cantar y Cuestión de peso. With this programming, the channel scored second place in 2012, 2013 and 2014.

Tinelli remained as the main figure of the channel during this decade. He was absent from Showmatch in 2013 when he decided to take a sabbatical year after finishing his contract with Channel 13. In that year he was about to move to Telefe, in the middle of an operation led by the Kirchner left-wing government through businessman Cristóbal López, to harm Grupo Clarín. The businessman that mostly controlled Canal 13 during this decade was Guido Kaczka (pronounced [ˈkatʃka]), who led programs such as A todo o nada, Los 8 escalones, Dar la nota, La mejor elección, Hacelo feliz, Las puertas and La tribuna de Guido.

In March 2014, after 34 years, Mirtha Legrand returned to EL Trece starring in Almorzando con Mirtha Legrand (which airs on Sundays at 1:30 p.m.) and La noche de Mirtha (Saturdays at 10:00 p.m.).

Effective 24 June 2016, the network's name was restyled to a single all-lowercase word (eltrece).

== Logos ==
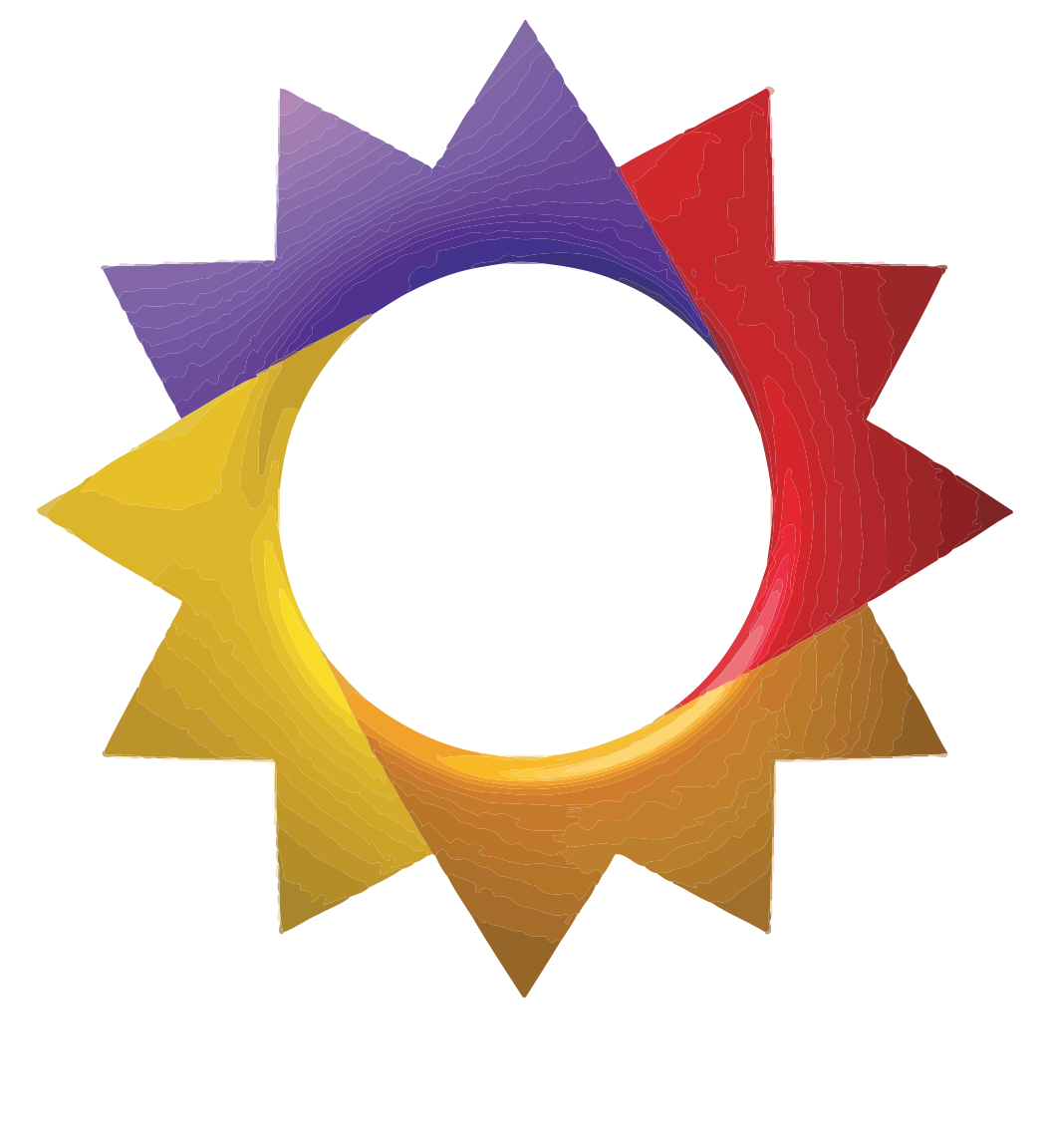
2000-2008

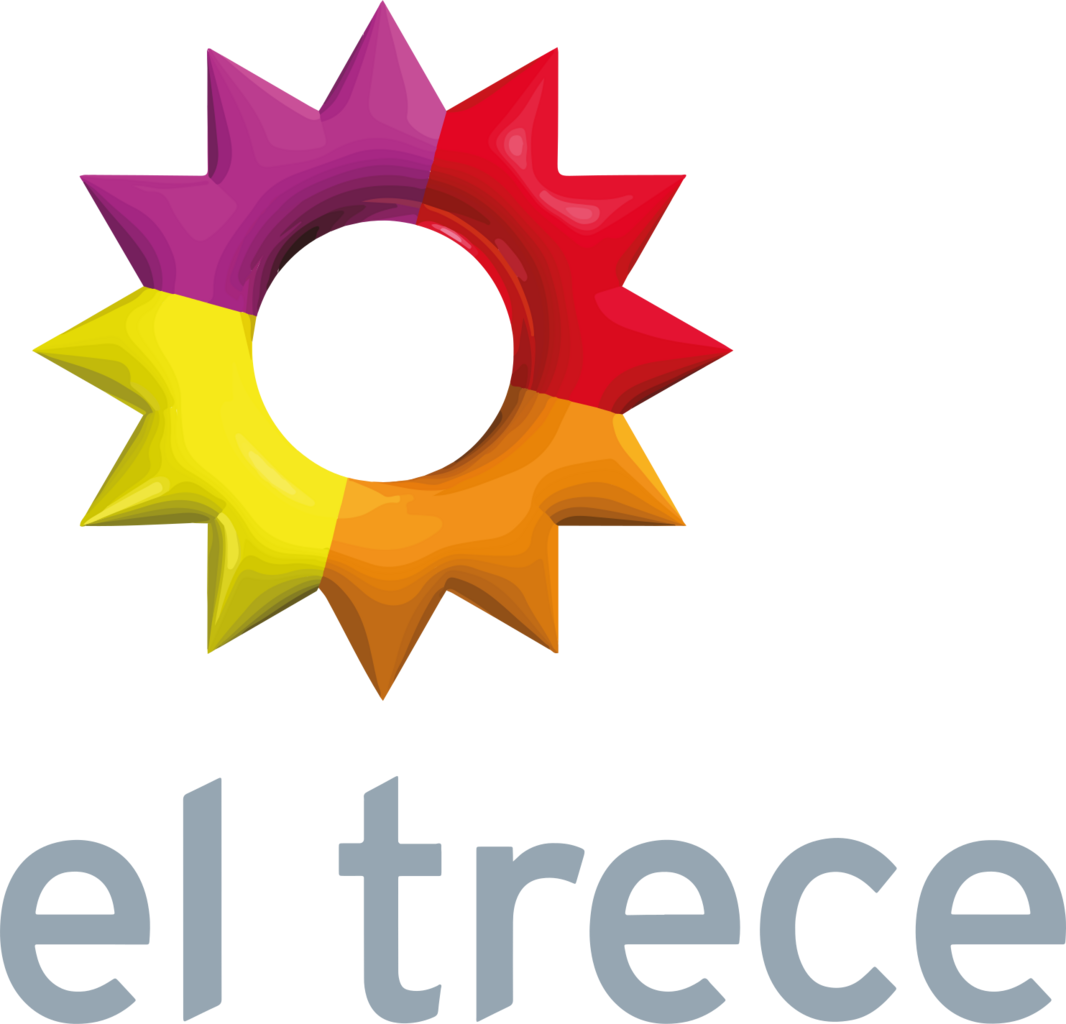
2008-2016
