= Julián Ercolini =

Argentine judge

Julián Ercolini is an Argentine federal judge known for investigating presidents Cristina Kirchner and Néstor Kirchner. He was made a judge in 2004. He is married with two children.

He became a judge of the federal court in 2004. He worked on a denunciation of then-president Néstor Kirchner, accused of illicit enrichment. He declared him innocent in 2005. Three years later, he worked on a large denunciation for criminal conspiracy against Kirchner and other politicians, filed by legislator Elisa Carrió. Carrió denounced Ercolini as well before the Magistrature.

Ercolini received a judicial case started in 2010 around the sale of shares in the Papel Prensa manufacturer of newsprint, which was claimed to have been done under duress during the Dirty War. He ruled in 2016 that Héctor Magnetto and Ernestina Herrera de Noble (from the Clarín newspaper) and Bartolomé Mitre (from La Nación newspaper) were innocent, as there was no evidence of any wrongdoing on their part.

He jailed Ricardo Jaime in 2016 for buying useless railway parts from Spain and Portugal. He indicted the former president Cristina Fernández de Kirchner for criminal conspiracy at the end of 2016.
