= Ernestina Herrera de Noble =

Argentine publisher and executive (1925–2017)

- Born: Ernestina Laura Herrera; 7 June 1925; Buenos Aires, Argentina
- Died: 14 June 2017 (aged 92); Buenos Aires, Argentina
- Resting place: La Recoleta Cemetery
- Occupation: Grupo Clarín (Chairperson)
- Spouse: Roberto Noble (m. 1967; died 1969)
- Children: 2

Ernestina Laura Herrera de Noble (7 June 1925 – 14 June 2017) was a prominent Argentine publisher and executive. She was the largest shareholder of the Grupo Clarín media conglomerate and director of the flagship Clarín newspaper. She was the first woman to become director of a mainstream newspaper in South America.

== Life and times ==
Ernestina Laura Herrera was born in Buenos Aires in 1925. She became a Flamenco dancer and met the founding publisher of Clarín, Roberto Noble, around 1950. The two maintained a sporadic relationship until Noble and his wife, Guadalupe Zapata, were divorced in the early 1960s. She and the publisher were married in 1967; Roberto Noble died of cancer on 12 January 1969.

As his widow, she inherited a controlling stake in Clarín, Argentina's most widely circulated newspaper since 1965. Despite its large circulation, however, Clarín suffered financial difficulties when Mrs. Noble inherited the director's post. She turned to one of the late Roberto Noble's most prominent allies, economist and wholesaler Rogelio Julio Frigerio, who lent Clarín US$10 million, in 1971. The paper continued to endorse Frigerio's centrist MID platform, which centered on government support for infrastructure investment and import substitution industrialization. On Frigerio's advice, Mrs. Noble brought in Héctor Magnetto, who took charge of the newspaper's finances.

The periodical's finances were further bolstered early in Mrs. Noble's tenure by a 1977 partnership established with its main competitors, La Nación and La Razón, and the Argentine State in Papel Prensa - the largest domestic newsprint manufacturer. Under her leadership, Clarín extended its reach into Argentine media, purchasing two second-ranked outlets, Radio Mitre and Channel 13, in 1990, Multicanal Cable TV in 1992, and other stations and magazines. She extended the partnership with La Nación by leading Clarín into a joint wire service, Diarios y Noticias (DyN), in 1982, and into a holding company in 1997, Cimeco S.A., which obtained majority stakes in numerous regional newspapers (notably Los Andes of Mendoza and La Voz del Interior of Córdoba). Controlled by Mrs. Noble and the paper's longtime directors, Héctor Magnetto, José Antonio Aranda and Lucio Rafael Pagliaro, Grupo Clarín was established from these holdings in 1999 as the most important media conglomerate in Argentina.

These successes were accompanied by numerous controversies surrounding her personally, however. She has maintained a long-standing probate dispute with Roberto Noble's only biological child, Guadalupe Noble, who was born in 1958 during his marriage to Guadalupe Zapata. Mrs. Noble arrived at a partial settlement of the dispute with Guadalupe Noble, though the matter of the controlling stake in Grupo Clarín remains pending.

Mrs. Noble was detained in December 2002 by order of Judge Roberto Marquevich following a lawsuit filed by the Grandmothers of the Plaza de Mayo alleging that the two infants she adopted in 1976, Marcela and Felipe, should submit DNA samples on the possibility that their biological parents may have been abducted by the last dictatorship during their Dirty War against dissidents. Her request to deny the samples was ruled in her favor in June 2008, though the case remains in litigation. On 17 October 2009, President Cristina Fernández de Kirchner proposed the compulsory submission of DNA samples in cases related to crimes against humanity, in a move lauded by the Grandmothers of the Plaza de Mayo, but excoriated by opposition figures as a political move against Mrs. Noble amid the controversies between Clarín and Kirchnerism that first arose in 2008.

Similar motives are alleged by the opposition against the presidentially sponsored Media Law, which would restrict the number of media licenses per proprietor and allocate a greater share of these to state and NGOs, thereby limiting the influence of the Clarín Group. The hitherto cordial relations between Mrs. Noble and Kirchnerism was further strained by a federal lawsuit filed by the executive branch alleging that the 1977 purchase of Papel Prensa had been illegally arranged. She was declared innocent in the Papel Prensa case in 2016.

== Death ==
She died on 14 June 2017, aged 92.
