= Hermenegildo Sábat =

Uruguayan-Argentine caricaturist (1933–2018)

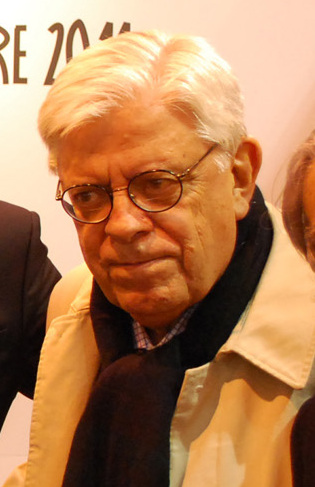
- Sábat in 2017
- Born: 23 June 1933; Pocitos, Montevideo, Uruguay
- Died: 2 October 2018 (aged 85)
- Occupations: Journalist, caricaturist, jazz
- Years active: 1955–2018
- Spouse: Blanca Rodríguez
- Website: www.hermenegildosabat.com.ar

Hermenegildo Sábat (23 June 1933 – 2 October 2018) was an Argentine-Uruguayan caricaturist.

== Life and work ==
=== Early career in journalism ===
Hermenegildo Sábat was born in the oceanfront Pocitos section of Montevideo, Uruguay, in 1933. Named after a grandparent who had been a noted local artist in his day, Hermenegildo was known as "Menchi," from early childhood. Montevideo's leading news daily, El País, first published a drawing of his - a portrait of Uruguay national football team forward Juan Schiaffino - when the young artist was but 15 years old.

Sábat's first work experience in journalism began in 1955 as a graphist in Acción, returning to El País, in 1957. His career prospered in El País, and Sábat became an editor at the daily, as well as contributing work as a staff correspondent, photographer and illustrator. His byline was featured in other Uruguayan periodicals in subsequent years, such as Marcha, Lunes and Reporte, and he freelanced as a graphic designer.

He married Blanca Rodríguez, in 1961, and the couple had two children. A dispute with El País' owners, however, led Sábat to emigrate to neighboring Argentina, in 1966. Following a stint at Editorial Abril, a Buenos Aires publishing house, his caricatures were soon included in Primera Plana and Crísis (then the leading Argentine news magazines), as leading dailies such as Clarín, and La Opinión, for which Sábat became the sole illustrator. The closure of La Opinión by the new dictatorship in 1977 led to Sábat's transfer to Clarín, where he would remain over the years.

Sábat's interest in jazz and tango resulted in his writing numerous books on the genres, including: a biography of tango vocalist Carlos Gardel - Al troesma con cariño (To the Maestro, with Love, 1971); of trumpeter Bix Beiderbecke - Yo Bix, Tú Bix, Él Bix (1972); and Scat: una interpretación gráfica del jazz (1974).

=== Later years ===
Becoming a naturalized Argentine citizen in 1980, Sábat continued his commission with Clarín while contributing occasionally to other dailies, such as the Buenos Aires Herald. He became a fixture in Clarín with his illustrations of political commentator Eduardo van der Kooy's weekly columns. His caricatures made him increasingly well-known, and parodied even authoritarian leaders such as Juan Perón and the heads of the National Reorganization Process.

He kept working after Argentina's return to democracy, in 1983. President Raúl Alfonsín's ineffective handling of the foreign debt crisis and military demands earned him Sábat's portrayals as a ballet dancer straining to impress stone-faced generals, or, at best, a tightrope walker struggling to retain balance. Political or military figures known to be especially close to the powerful Catholic Church included a small halo, and CGT labor union leader Saúl Ubaldini (Alfonsín's most vocal opponent) paid for his frequent on-camera theatrics with Sábat's portrayal of his tearful breakdowns and use of the elbow (a typically Italian insult). His dauntless approach to humor helped earn him the prestigious Maria Moors Cabot prize, in 1988 (among his numerous other recognitions).

Alfonsín's successor, Carlos Menem, proved particularly useful as fodder for Argentine humorists. The flamboyant Menem's prominent sideburns and ongoing push to extend constitutional term limits lent itself easily to Sábat's portrayal of him as a man fused to his presidential chair.

His caricatures portrayed political figures, as well as artists and other personalities. The death of well-known Argentine cultural icons were infallibly followed by Sábat's homage in the form of an angel (see Ástor Piazzolla's portrait, above).

He portrayed President Cristina Fernández de Kirchner in 2008 in Clarín, with tape over her mouth, during the 2008 agrarian lockout. She considered it a "quasi-mafioso message". He draw her with a punch to the face during the 7D, in reference to a judicial ruling that benefited Clarín in the conflict between Kirchnerism and the media. The legislature of Buenos Aires accused him of violence against women, and José Pablo Feinmann said that "he should not draw what he thinks".

In 2017 he won the Diamond Konex Award, one of the most prestigious awards given in Argentina.

He died on October 2, 2018, during his sleep. He was aged 85.

== Books ==
- Al troesma con cariño (1971), about Carlos Gardel
- Yo Bix, Tú Bix, Él Bix (1972), about Bix Beiderbecke
- Scat: una interpretación gráfica del jazz (1974)
- Una selección de dibujos públicados entre los años 1971 y 1975 (1975)
- Galería personal (1975)
- Dogor (1979), about Aníbal Troilo
- Monsieur Lautrec (1980), with Julio Cortázar, about Henri de Toulouse-Lautrec
- Tango Mío (1981)
- Sentido pésame (1984)
- Una satisfacción tras otra (1990)
- Haberlo sabido antes (1992)
- Fotos (1996)
- Jazz a la carte (1996)
- Carta a Torres García (1996)
- Crónicas del Ángel Gris (1996), illustrations for book by Alejandro Dolina
- Adioses tardíos (1998)
- La casa sigue en orden: cuatro décadas de historia en dibujos (1999)
- Georgie Dear (1999), about Jorge Luis Borges
- Imágenes latentes (2001)
- Dos dedos: una interpretación de Django Reinhardt (2004)
- Siguen las firmas: inventario apócrifo de falsedades, mentiras y algunas certidumbres (2006)
- El pájaro murió de risa (2007), about Charlie Parker
- Anónimo Transparente (2007), about Fernando Pessoa
- Que no se entere Piazzolla (2008), about Ástor Piazzolla
