= David Graiver =

Argentine businessman and banker

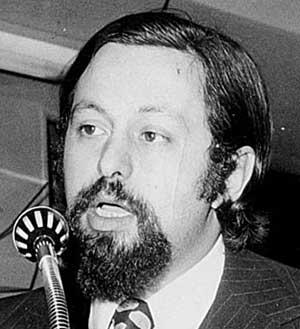
- Graiver in 1971
- Born: 1941; Buenos Aires, Argentina
- Died: August 7, 1976 (aged 34–35); Chilpancingo, Mexico
- Spouses: Susana Rottemberg; Lidia Papaleo
- Children: 1

David Graiver (1941 — 1976) was an Argentine businessman and banker who was investigated in the 1970s for alleged money laundering of US$17 million for the Montoneros, a leftist guerrilla group. He was indicted for embezzlement after his reported death by Manhattan District Attorney Robert Morgenthau, who had thought he might have faked his death, because of the September 15, 1976, failure of American Bank & Trust. This was the fourth-largest bank failure in United States history at the time, and Graiver's banks in Argentina and elsewhere also failed. A New York court declared Graiver officially dead on January 15, 1979, clearing the way for resolution of some outstanding financial issues.

== Early life and career ==
Graiver was born in Buenos Aires to Eva Gitnacht and Juan Graiver, Polish Jewish immigrants who had come to Argentina in 1931. The family later settled in La Plata, where they developed a successful realty company. David Graiver enrolled at the University of La Plata Law School. He did not finish the program but, with his family's support, purchased the Banco Comercial de La Plata in 1967.

He married Susana Rottemberg, and the couple had a daughter, María Sol, in 1974; they were separated shortly afterward. Graiver next married Lidia Papaleo, the daughter of a prominent Greek Argentine family.

== Business and banking ==
Graiver's ownership of the Banco Comercial de La Plata allowed him to enter into a variety of business interests. He established the Fundar and Construir real estate development firms. In 1969, he announced plans to build Bristol Center, a Mar del Plata development projected to include over 1,200 condominiums in three high-rises overlooking a convention center and entertainment complex.

He entered public service when appointed as Undersecretary of Social Welfare for Minister Francisco Manrique during the presidency of General Alejandro Lanusse. He served as policy advisor to Economy Minister José Ber Gelbard following elections in 1973 that returned the Justicialist Party to power. in December 1973 he purchased a 26% stake in Papel Prensa, the first manufacturer of newsprint in Argentina (the state purchased the remainder). After the election of his candidate Héctor Cámpora, the former president Juan Perón returned from exile in Spain with his third wife Isabel Perón.

== Banker to Montoneros ==
Graiver was later reported to have secretly become the investment banker for the Montoneros leftist guerrilla group. He reportedly laundered US$17 million in funds that the Montoneros had received from illicit activities, principally ransoms paid for release of persons they had kidnapped. He made investments on their behalf in a variety of interests in Argentina and other countries, including the United States. By 1976, Graiver owned a significant stake in Jacobo Timerman's La Opinión (one of the leading newspapers and the leading magazine publisher in Argentina), the Galerías da Vinci retailer, as well as banks in Argentina (Comercial de La Plata and the Bank of Hurlingham), New York City (American Bank & Trust and Century National Bank), Brussels (Banque pour l’Amérique du Sud), and Tel Aviv (Swiss-Israel Bank). These and other assets amounted to around US$200 million by then. The Israeli intelligence service Mossad classified Graiver as one of the three leading Jewish banking figures in Latin America (ranked with José Klein in Chile, and Edmond Safra in Brazil).

In 1975 Graiver's younger brother Isidoro was kidnapped for ransom. Following an attempt against him, Graiver fled to New York City in 1975. He rented an office in the Olympic Tower and administered his diverse interests from there. Debts of US$67 million, however, prompted Graiver to transfer around US$45 million in loans from American Bank & Trust to his Brussels bank. It made large loans to Graiver-controlled businesses. He maintained a second home in Acapulco, Mexico, reportedly for tax evasion. Graiver was reported to have died on August 7, 1976, in a plane crash nearby.

== Posthumous controversies ==
Manhattan district attorney Robert Morgenthau was skeptical that Graiver had died in the crash. The incident was never investigated by the Mexican government nor was the flight recorder ever found. In 1978, Morgenthau's office issued an indictment against Graiver for embezzlement related to the September 15, 1976, failure of American Bank & Trust. It was the fourth-largest bank failure in United States history at the time. Graiver's banks in Argentina and elsewhere also failed. New York State Supreme Court Judge Arnold Fraiman ruled on January 15, 1979, that Graiver was officially dead, although the judge expressed some reservations.

Following Graiver's 1976 reported death, his widow Lidia Papaleo returned to Argentina on September 16 of that year, after the first bank failure. Facing debts and death threats, Papaleo was enjoined by the newly installed military dictatorship's Economy Minister, José Alfredo Martínez de Hoz, to sell the Graiver stake in Papel Prensa. By then, Graiver had earlier sold part of his interest to Rafael Iannover, but Lidia Papaleo Graiver retained 11%, or about US$1 million. The federal prosecutor appointed to the case, Julio César Strassera, uncovered coercion from the Montoneros, who sought to recover the US$17 million investment managed by Graiver. A military tribunal convicted Papaleo, Isidoro and Juan Graiver (brother and nephew of David Graiver), sentencing them to 15 years' imprisonment. An appeals court later cleared the defendants of all charges.

Papaleo and the other private partners negotiated the sale of their shares on November 2, 1976, with the three most important Argentine newspaper publishers at the time: Clarín, La Nación, and La Razón. Papaleo had collected US$7,000 when, on March 14, 1977, she was illegally detained by Buenos Aires Province Police, specifically Chief Detective Miguel Etchecolatz and the Commissioner, Ramón Camps.

Conarepa, the state entity formed to liquidate assets seized from political opponents, expropriated the uncompleted Bristol Center and other Graiver family properties in Argentina. The private shareholders of Papel Prensa, including the widow Lidia Papaleo, were later indemnified in 1985 by President Raúl Alfonsín's administration, which sought to correct some of the abuses of the period of the Dirty War.

More than 20 years later, amid a series of political controversies between Clarín and Kirchnerism, in 2010 Papaleo testified to having been personally threatened by Clarín executive Héctor Magnetto during the sale of her shares of Papel Prensa. She said that she had been tortured in police custody in 1977 and was urged to forfeit any further payment, as well as her remaining shares in La Opinión.
