= Jose Maria Del Pino =

Chilean-American journalist

- Born: Jose Maria Del Pino Carrasco; April 18, 1988 (age 38); Chillan, Chile
- Education: Colegio Seminario Padre Hurtado
- Alma mater: Columbia University (MA)
- Occupation: Journalist
- Writing career
- Pen name: "JM"
- Genre: Male

Jose Maria Del Pino Carrasco is a Chilean journalist, academic and writer, graduated from Columbia University. He is currently the White House and Washington D.C. Correspondent for NTN24, and he also works for Canal 13 (Chile) as a Senior U.S. Correspondent.

== Biography ==
He was born in Chillan, Chile, into a middle-class family. He is the oldest of the four children of Juan Francisco Del Pino and Veronica Carrasco, his parents. He attended primary and secondary school at the Padre Hurtado where he was president of the Students Board. He studied law at the Universidad Catolica but did not finish his studies. He completed his undergraduate studies at the Universidad de las Artes, las Ciencias y las Comunicaciones, where he majored in communications.

== Career ==
His professional career began in 2015 at Radio Bio Bio, where he worked as a reporter and then as Content Director.

In 2018, he took a pivotal step in his career, dedicating a year to the Fre Foundation's executive direction, focusing on the social integration of the Haitian community in Chile due to a significant migration wave. His performance led to him being selected as one of the 100 young leaders of Chile that year by the esteemed El Mercurio and Adolfo Ibanez University, a recognition of his impactful work.

In 2019, he became the Santiago correspondent for the Clarin Group of Argentina, providing information for the Clarin Newspaper, Todonoticias News Network, and Mitre Radio.

In 2023, he graduated with a Master of Arts in Political Journalism from Columbia University's Graduate School of Journalism. He was awarded a fellowship at Columbia Journalism Investigations, where he worked for nine months in an investigation with the Reuters News Agency on the new migration routes to the United States. He also worked as a writer for Telemundo 47 in New York and received two nominations for the 2024 Emmy Awards for best writer and best weekend newscast

He is currently a White House Correspondents Association member and serves as a Washington D.C. correspondent for NTN24. Additionally, he is the national correspondent from the United States for Canal 13 in Chile.
