= Julio César Strassera =

Argentine lawyer and jurist

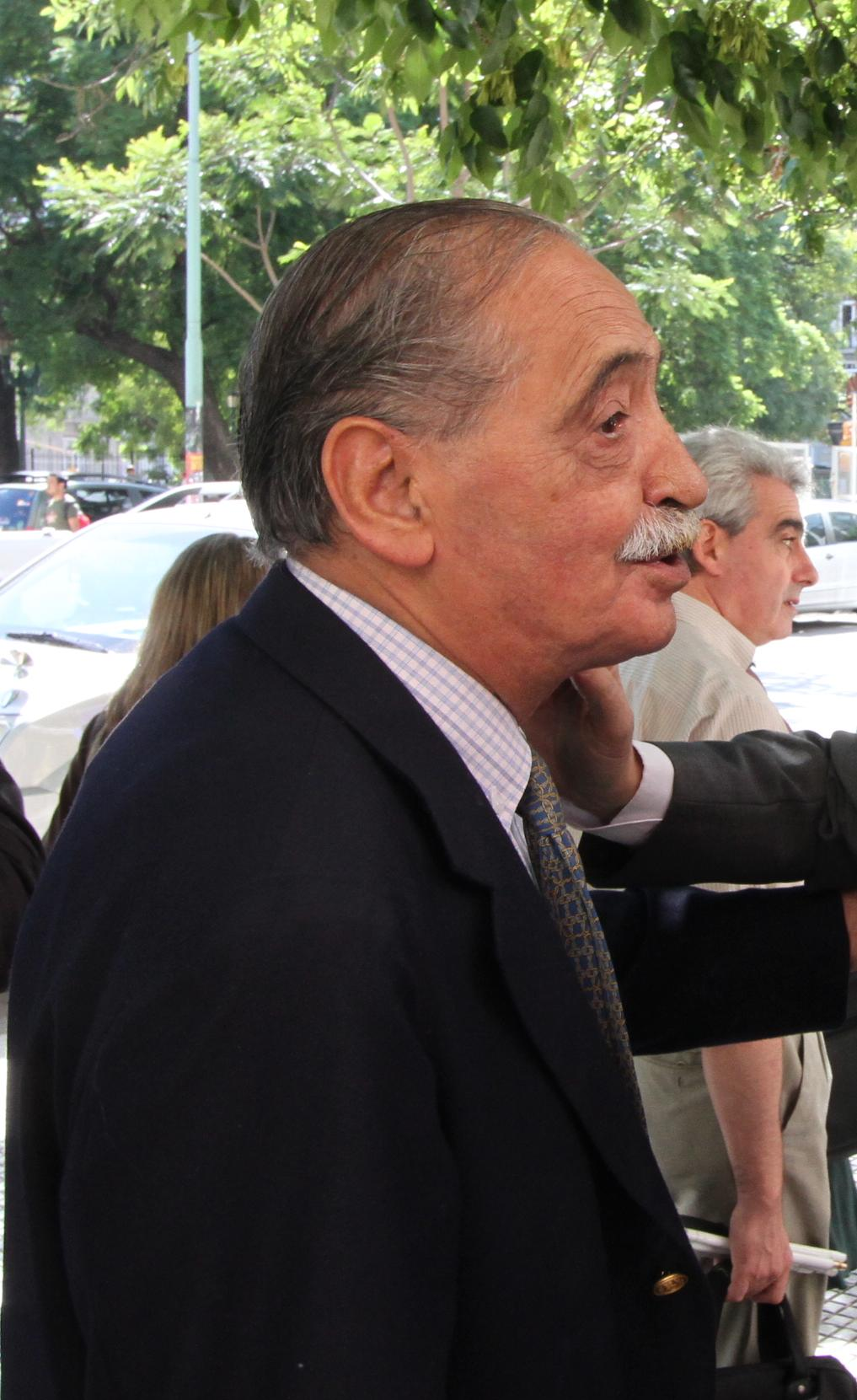
- Born: September 18, 1933; Comodoro Rivadavia, Argentina
- Died: February 27, 2015 (aged 81); Buenos Aires, Argentina
- Education: University of Buenos Aires

Julio César Strassera (September 18, 1933 – February 27, 2015) was an Argentine lawyer and jurist. He served as Chief Prosecutor during the Trial of the Juntas in 1985.

== Life and times ==
=== Early life ===
Strassera was born in Comodoro Rivadavia in 1933. He attended the prestigious Colegio San José college preparatory school, left two years shy of graduation, and returned to complete his secondary studies. He would later enroll at the University of Buenos Aires and earn a juris doctor in 1963. He was named Secretary of a Buenos Aires Federal Court shortly after the March 1976 coup, and was later appointed as a Federal Prosecutor.

=== Role during the Dirty War ===
His tenure as Federal Prosecutor coincided with the height of the Dirty War, and a large number of Habeas Corpus inquiries were solicited at his office during this period, many from friends and family of political prisoners. Strassera, however, refused to file most of these. Some of the most notable cases thereof included that of former Santa Cruz Governor Jorge Cepernic, who had been arrested following the coup, and whose property had been seized without due process and of Lidia Papaleo, whose majority ownership of newsprint manufacturer Papel Prensa was allegedly seized from her under duress following the death of her husband, financier David Graiver. Strassera was charged with investigating possible links between the late banker and the Montoneros guerrilla organization, and asked for a sentence of five years' imprisonment for the widow. His motion and appeal to this effect were both denied, however.

Another controversial motion filed by Strassera as prosecutor pertained to the July 4, 1976, San Patricio Church massacre - charges he succeeded in having the presiding judge drop. Strassera was named criminal court Judge in 1981, an appointment he considered a demotion since he would be relegated to "sentencing chicken thieves."

=== Trial of the Juntas ===
Strassera was reappointed prosecutor, however, following the election of President Raúl Alfonsín in 1983. Following the president's October 4, 1984, decision to have leading members of the military dictatorship tried by a civilian appeals court, Strassera was offered the post of Chief Counsel for the Prosecution by the Minister of Justice, Carlos Alconada Aramburú.

Strassera appointed Assistant Prosecutor Luis Moreno Ocampo, who at the time served as counsel in the Solicitor General's department. Both men had served in Justice Ministry posts during the dictatorship, and both would now prosecute crimes against humanity by its leaders. Both were also the only two of the many prosecutors contacted who accepted the challenging posts.

The difficulty of gathering evidence and testimony from reluctant witnesses for this trial — the first proceedings of their kind since the proceedings against Greek Junta leadership in 1975 — was compounded by pressure from many of those implicated in the abuses and their allies. Strassera's office was contacted on numerous occasions by the former Interior Minister during the dictatorship, General Albano Harguindeguy, as well as by right-wing figures in the ruling UCR itself. During the trial itself, 29 bomb threats were received in Buenos Aires schools, and a number were detonated in key government installations.

Hearings officially began on April 22, 1985, upon which Strassera presented 709 cases to the presiding tribunal. Ultimately, 280 cases were heard and 833 witnesses testified, including former President, General Alejandro Lanusse and writer Jorge Luis Borges. The number of defendants, however, were narrowed to the nine leading junta members in power from 1976 to 1982. Excluded were the roughly 600 officers charged at the time with abuses in courts across the country.

The last day of testimony took place on August 14, 1985. Strassera presented charges against the nine defendants — including three former Presidents — on September 11. He argued that sentences for each defendant be dictated by the proven role of each military junta in the cases heard by the court. The tribunal, however, ruled that sentencing should be determined by the role of each branch of the Argentine Armed Forces in each case, thereby lessening sentences for the Air Force commanders on trial.

Chief Prosecutor Julio César Strassera (left) reads closing arguments in the historic Trial of the Juntas.

Strassera presented closing arguments on September 18, saying:

I wish to waive any claim to originality in closing this motion. I wish to use a phrase that is not my own, because it already belongs to all the Argentine people. Your Honors: Never again!

=== Later career ===
The December 9 sentencing of General Jorge Videla and Admiral Eduardo Massera to life imprisonment, of three others to lighter sentences, and the acquittal of four others for insufficient evidence proved a disappointment to most supporters of the trials. The 1986/87 enactment of the Full Stop Law and the Law of Due Obedience effectively halted most remaining prosecutions, moreover, and those sentenced were ultimately pardoned in 1989 and 1990 by President Carlos Menem.

Strassera subsequently represented Argentina at the United Nations Commission on Human Rights and related international organizations. Following Menem's pardons, he resigned his government posts, and joined the Permanent Assembly for Human Rights, one of the leading non-governmental human rights organizations in Argentina.

The noted prosecutor and jurist would remain a controversial figure in Argentina, however. Strassera defended Buenos Aires Mayor Aníbal Ibarra during his 2005 impeachment trial against charges of negligence as the city's chief magistrate during the deadly República Cromañón nightclub fire. He later became a vocal opponent of Kirchnerism despite the numerous changes enacted by President Néstor Kirchner that allowed trials of hitherto immune Dirty War perpetrators to proceed. He opposed the extradition request against former President Isabel Perón (whose authorization of Operativo Independencia in 1975 arguably began the Dirty War), and insinuated that the Kirchners promoted trials against indicted officers for political expediency.

Amid a series of controversies between Clarín and Kirchnerism, an exchange of accusations followed Strassera's defense of the Clarín Media Group's claim that Papel Prensa had been acquired lawfully from the Graivers. Cabinet Chief Aníbal Fernández pointed to Strassera's sanctions against lawyers who presented Habeas Corpus petitions during the 1976 — 83 dictatorship as proof that his role in the subsequent Trial of the Juntas was merely pretense, and Strassera, in turn, claimed the Kirchners "never have done anything for human rights in Argentina," and instead "dedicated themselves to making money."

Strassera was checked into the San Camilo Clinic in Caballito, Buenos Aires, on February 16, 2015, with a condition of hyperglycemia, and died ten days later; he was 81.
