= Noble siblings case =

Argentine legal and genetic dispute

The Noble siblings case is an Argentine case concerning the biological identity of Marcela and Felipe Noble Herrera, adoptive daughter and son of Ernestina Herrera de Noble, owner of Grupo Clarín. The Grandmothers of the Plaza de Mayo believe them to be children of women who disappeared during the Dirty War, and have requested samples for DNA profiling to compare with their database of victim families. Marcela and Felipe rejected the study. The administrations of both presidents Néstor and Cristina Kirchner supported a compulsory blood collection in order to carry out the DNA profiling. The opposing parties and legal precedence, on the other hand, support the Nobles' right to privacy.

== Development ==
Ernestina Herrera de Noble requested on May 13, 1976 in the Juvenile Court No. 1 of San Isidro, at that time in charge of Judge Ofelia Hejt, the adoption of a girl that she said she had found eleven days before in a cardboard box left at the door of his house, offering as witnesses his neighbor Yolanda Echagüe de Aragón and Roberto García, his driver, whom he introduced as the caretaker of Yolanda Echagüe de Aragón's farm.

Shortly after, on July 7, 1976, Herrera de Noble asked the same judge for the adoption of another baby, a boy who would have been left that same day in the same court as Judge Hejt, by a person who claimed to be single mother, who exhibited a national identity document that was later found not to correspond to her and gave a false address. That same day, without further formality, the judge gave him the custody of the baby and just 43 days later he granted the adoption and imposed the name of Felipe Noble Herrera. Hejt died in 1978.

The case started in 2001, and two years later Marcela and Felipe agreed to compare their DNA with the two litigant families. Those families, however, delayed the execution of the ruling.

In 2009, during the controversies between Clarín and Kirchnerism, Marcela and Felipe agreed to a new study at the Forensic Medical Unit, but judge Conrado Bergesio ordered a search of their homes and the collection of personal clothing. Bergesio was replaced by Arroyo Salgado, who considered the evidence to be insufficient for a DNA profiling, and attempted to detain Marcela and Felipe at the street, break into Ernestina's house, and a compulsory collection of blood and spit. All opposing parties condemned the attitude towards the Noble Herrera. Salgado ruled as well that the collection should not be done by the Forensic Medical Unit, but by the National Bank of Genetic Databases, under control of the executive power.

A 2011 ruling ordered again a compulsory collection of blood and spit, but not allowing to compare it with the more than 1,500 samples in the Grandmother's database, but just with a few specific families. The Noble Herrera will appeal, and their defense will be based in that Marcela and Felipe are adults, that they did not commit any crime, and have the right to refuse these studies.

The Prieto-Gualtieri case decided in 2009 by the Supreme Court of Argentina, set the precedent that compulsory blood collection is an unconstitutional violation of the right to privacy.

The adopted children of Clarín owner Ernestina Herrera de Noble accuse Aníbal Fernández of using them as pawns in her conflict with their mother's company. "We feel scared, anguished, insecure, persecuted," Felipe Noble Herrera and his sister Marcela said in a televised statement.

== Requested closure ==
The appropriation charges have not been proved by DNA tests. The head of group Abuelas de Plaza de Mayo, who advocated for those tests, has said the case is not closed as new tests will be performed as more families of disappeared submit blood samples to the genetic pool. Aníbal Fernández said the government should not have to apologize to the adopted children of Ernestina Noble Herrera magnate. The lawyers of the Noble Herrera request instead that the case against Ernestina Herrera de Noble be closed, as happened with all the similar cases when the DNA tests gave negative results. The case was finally closed in January 2016.

== See also ==
- Controversies between Clarín and Kirchnerism
