= La Opinión (Argentina) =

Daily newspaper based in Argentina

- Type: Daily newspaper
- Format: Berliner
- Publisher: Jacobo Timerman (1971-77)
- Founded: May 4, 1971
- Ceased publication: December 2, 1980
- Political alignment: Social liberalism Progressivism
- Headquarters: Buenos Aires
- Circulation: 150,000 (1974)

La Opinión was an Argentine newspaper, founded by the journalist Jacobo Timerman in 1971. Its ideology was broadly centrist, inspired partly by the Paris daily Le Monde.

== History ==
Timerman, an Argentine Jewish immigrant from Ukraine, had previously launched numerous successful news publications in Argentina, notably Primera Plana and Confirmado news magazines. Billed as "the news daily for the great minority" in an initial publicity campaign written by a friend of Timerman, author Pedro Orgambide, La Opinión adopted an editorial line described by Timerman as "rightist economically, centrist politically and leftist culturally." The newspaper was created by a team led by Jacobo Timerman (editor), Julio Algañaraz, Horacio Verbitsky and Juan Carlos Algañaraz, as managing editors. Editors: Tomás Eloy Martínez, Jose Maria Pasquini Durán, Felisa Pinto, Roberto Cossa and Julio Nudler.

Its editorial board was led by Timerman, Julio Algañaraz, Horacio Verbitsky and Juan Carlos Algañaraz. Its pages would subsequently include bylines by Juan Gelman, Miguel Bonasso, Carlos Ulanovsky, Tomás Eloy Martínez, Ernesto Sábato, Pompeyo Camps, Osvaldo Soriano, Ricardo Halac, Enrique Raab, Roberto Cossa, Victoria Walsh, María Esther Giglio, Raúl Vera Ocampo, Pablo Urbanyi, Gerardo Fernández, José Agustín Mahieu, Hugo Gambini, Luis Aubele, Bernardo Verbitsky and other noted figures in Argentine journalism and the arts. Instead of photos, the paper illustrated articles with caricatures by Hermenegildo Sábat. La Opinión grew rapidly, and by 1974, averaged a daily circulation of 150,000, becoming Buenos Aires' fourth-largest news daily.

== Silent partner ==
Planning to purchase a larger printing plant, Timerman sold a 45% stake in 1974 to David Graiver. Graiver, a real estate developer, became the investment banker for the Montoneros guerrilla group. He reportedly laundered us$17 million in funds obtained by the Montoneros from their frequent kidnappings in a variety of interests in both Argentina and overseas, including La Opinión. Graiver died in an aviation crash on August 7, 1976.

La Opinión devoted extensive coverage to Third World issues, as well as to the ongoing Arab–Israeli conflict. Timerman and other La Opinión staff had already suffered death threats by the Argentine Anticommunist Alliance as early as 1973. The paper was supportive of the Marxist government of President Salvador Allende in neighboring Chile, and was labeled "Enemy Number One" by the subsequent Chilean dictatorship of General Augusto Pinochet. The publication was, however, generally supportive of the March 1976 coup that toppled President Isabel Perón in Argentina, describing the nation (referring to left-wing violence) as "helpless before the slaughter."

== Suppression ==
The paper gradually distanced itself from the dictatorship as mounting evidence of the Dirty War appeared. A number of its staff would be abducted by the regime throughout 1976, and Timerman responded to these events (as well as to death threats) with critical editorials. The paper also published correspondence between Timerman and Congressman Donald M. Fraser of Minnesota in which the publisher offered to testify in the United States Congress regarding the Dirty War. The daily's opposition to the dictatorship intensified, and on January 30, 1977, its circulation was confiscated, as well as the corresponding color magazine insert, on the charge of "offending the Argentine government and military."

The technical manager of La Opinión, Edgardo Sajón, was abducted on April 1, and La Opinión placed under Federal intervention. Urged to leave the country by friends and family, Timerman refused, and on April 15, he was abducted by a paramilitary group under the orders of Buenos Aires Province Police Chief Ramón Camps; the publishing house was expropriated in November. Timerman was kept in detention for a period of two and a half years, and was subjected to torture during the early days of his detention; he was ultimately released in September 1979, and sought exile in Israel. La Opinión remained in print under military ownership until its last remaining assets were sold at auction in December 1980.

He returned to Argentina in January 1984, and edited La Razón until 1987. Timerman died in 1999.

== A controversy revisited ==
The long-defunct La Opinión became one of numerous points of contention during a series of political controversies between Clarín and Kirchnerism from 2008 onward. David Graiver's widow, Lidia Papaleo, testified in 2010 to having been intimidated by Clarín Group executive Héctor Magnetto, and subsequently tortured by the police, to forfeit further payment in 1977 for her inherited shares in La Opinión and the nation's leading newsprint maker, Papel Prensa. She later recanted her testimony, affirming simply that she had been pressured to sell her shares, though never under duress.
