= 7D (Argentina) =

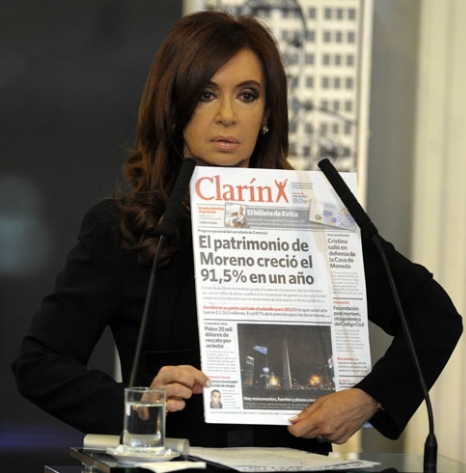
President Cristina Fernández de Kirchner holding a Clarín newspaper

The 7D, which stands for December 7, is a special date in Argentina for the conflict between Fernández de Kirchner government and the media. Feeling that the Clarín newspaper was responsible for the 2008 Argentine government conflict with the agricultural sector and the defeat at the 2009 legislative elections, the government created a media law to force the Grupo Clarín to sell their media assets. Clarín deemed that specific articles of that law that ordered that were unconstitutional, and began a trial over them. Clarín was benefited by an injunction for the duration of the trial, and in 2012 the Court pointed that the injunction should not extend beyond December 7, requesting the judges to make a sentence. The actual events that should take place on December 7 became a huge controversy in Argentina.

== Context ==
Cristina Fernández de Kirchner began her first presidency in 2007. The following year she tried to raise the taxes over the exports of primary products, leading to a conflict with the agricultural sector. The Congress voted the bill, got a tie, and vice president Julio Cobos cast a negative vote; the rejection of the bill ended the conflict. During the conflict the government accused both the demonstrators and the press, mainly the Clarín newspaper, of attempting a coup d'état.

The conflict reduced the public support to the Fernández de Kirchner administration, which stayed low as of 2009. The government brought the legislative elections, planned for October, forward to June. The former president Néstor Kirchner ran in a deputy candidacy. However, he lost the election to Francisco de Narváez. Blaming Clarín for the defeat, Kirchnerism prepared a new media law, which would force the Clarín Group to get rid of several licenses of radio, TV channels and TV cable. This could be done because, although the elections were anticipated, the date for the renewal of the chamber stayed the same, allowing a longer period for the defeated party to keep their majority.

Clarín began a trial on a pair of articles of the law, maintaining that they were not constitutional, and got an injunction that prevented the application of the law on them during the trial. It was the only media group that began such a trial, and the injunction benefited only them. However, the Kirchnerist administration refused to apply the law on the other media groups of the country until the trial of Clarín is over. As time passed without a sentence on the actual topic, the Supreme Court declared that the injunction should not extend beyond December 7, 2012, without a sentence.

== Escalation of events ==
The government announced in September, during a spot, that they would sell Clarín's licences if they had not proposed a plan to do so themselves on December 7. The spot used the name "7D" for it, which was incorporated in public discourse since then.

== Popular support ==
On 9 December 2012, around 800 thousand people went to Plaza de Mayo in support of the president Cristina Fernández de Kirchner and requested Argentinian justice to fulfill the law.

== Bibliography ==
- Fraga, Rosendo (2010). Fin de ciKlo: ascenso, apogeo y declinación del poder kirchnerista (in Spanish). Buenos Aires: Ediciones B. ISBN 978-987-627-167-7.
