= Héctor Magnetto =

Argentine executive

Héctor Horacio Magnetto
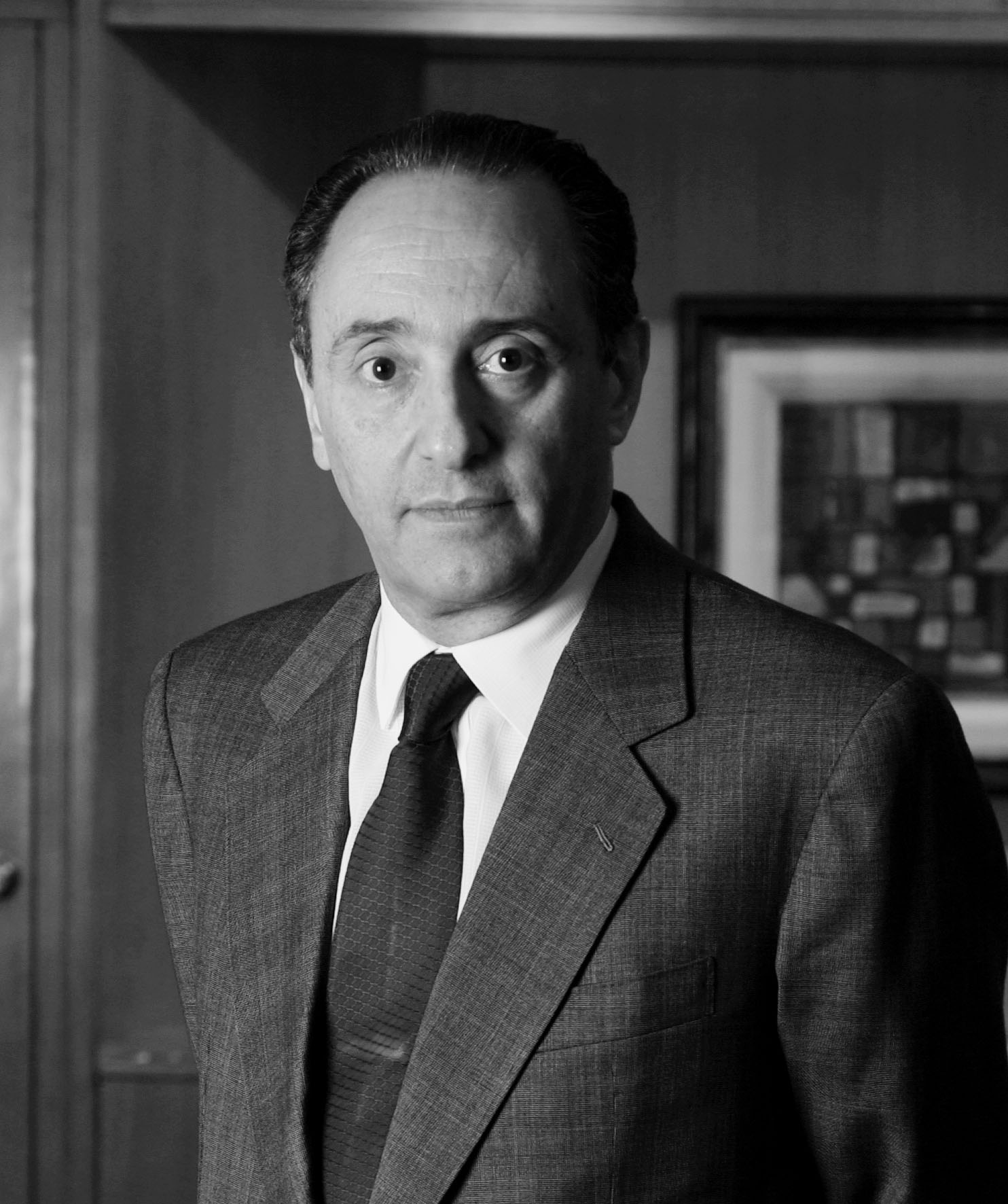
- Magnetto in 2002
- Born: 9 July 1944 (age 82); Chivilcoy, Buenos Aires, Argentina
- Education: University of La Plata
- Occupation: CEO

Héctor Horacio Magnetto (born 9 July 1944) is an Argentine executive CEO of the Clarín Group, the country's largest media company.

== Life and career ==
Magnetto was born in Chivilcoy in 1944, and enrolled at the University of La Plata, where he earned a degree in accountancy with honors. He became affiliated with the Integration and Development Movement (MID), a pro-industry political party, and on March 2, 1972, was hired as an advisor to Ernestina Herrera de Noble, the director and majority owner of Clarín, the most widely circulated newspaper in the Hispanic world. Despite its large circulation, Clarín suffered financial difficulties when Mrs. Noble, widow of founder Roberto Noble, inherited the director's post. She turned to one of the latter's most prominent allies, economist and wholesaler Rogelio Julio Frigerio, who lent Clarín US$10 million in 1971. The paper continued to endorse Frigerio's centrist MID platform, which centered on government support for infrastructure investment and import substitution industrialization. On Frigerio's advice, Mrs. Noble brought in Magnetto, who later took charge of the newspaper's finances. The young accountant persuaded Mrs. Noble to shed superfluous assets such as a company helicopter, and to begin negotiations with the owners of La Nación (Mitre family), La Prensa (Pas family) and La Razón (Peralta Ramos family) to take part in a federally sponsored establishment of a newsprint manufacturer. The plan, to cut costs by eliminating the need for imported newsprint, culminated in the inauguration of the Papel Prensa newsprint facility in 1978. Magnetto served as CEO of Papel Prensa, alternating with the directorship of La Nación, during subsequent years. He displaced most of his fellow MID-oriented colleagues at the newspaper in 1981, and afterwards became President and CEO. Keen to political trends, Magnetto spearheaded Clarín's vocal opposition to the administration of the populist-turned-conservative President, Carlos Menem, after the latter's re-election in 1995. He nevertheless maintained cordial relations with the runner-up of that campaign, Justicialist Party Governor Eduardo Duhalde, who was appointed President by the Argentine Congress following the December 2001 riots in Argentina that led to the resignation of his predecessor, Fernando De la Rua. Magnetto was able to parlay this understanding into Duhalde's support for a "Law of Preservation of Cultural Patrimony," which limited foreign ownership of local media to 30%, thereby protecting the Clarín Group's core businesses. The group had suffered steep losses during the 1999-2002 crisis, and the bill (passed in July 2003, dubbed the "Clarín Law" by detractors), helped solidify its finances. The company recovered alongside the Argentine economy in subsequent years, and by 2006, had acquired Cablevisión, its Multicanal cable unit's leading competitor. Magnetto had worsening health problems, chief among them esophageal cancer in early 2007, which for a time led to speculation as to his continuity as CEO of the Clarín group, as well as to a possible dispute over his 30% share in the company. Magnetto reacted positively to treatment, and underwent subsequent speech therapy.

He was on hand for the October 22, 2007, Clarín IPO in the Buenos Aires Stock Exchange, and continued to preside over the group. Former Argentine President Néstor Kirchner alleged that, during the 2008 Argentine government conflict with the agricultural sector, Magnetto offered a supportive spin on the administration's case for higher export tariffs, in exchange for an amenable treatment of the media group's acquisition of a significant stake in Telecom Argentina (a potential anti-trust law violation); the hitherto cordial relations between Kirchnerism and the Clarín Group soured during the conflict. Subsequently, Magnetto was one of 200 individuals investigated by the government for money laundering, mainly related to tax evasion.

Magnetto was named in a 2010 testimony by Lidia Papaleo, whose husband David Graiver owned Papel Prensa from 1973 until his death in 1976, as a key instigator of her torture by the police in 1977; Papaleo cited this as the reason for her selling her shares in La Opinión and Papel Prensa at the time. The newspaper Clarin published that Papaleo "recanted her testimony," violating every ethical standard of journalism. In fact, Papaleo confirmed in the trial that she and her family were under great psychological pressure and forced to sell Papel Prensa. Magnetto was found innocent in 2016.
