= Kathy Schenfelt =

- Born: Río Gallegos, Argentina
- Occupation: Executive producer at Good Harper Films

Kathy Schenfelt is an Argentine-born entertainment executive, and talent manager based in Los Angeles, California. She is president of SCH Entertainment, founder of the talent management firm Missmanaged, and creative director of the members-only community for women in entertainment, Guests Only. She also serves as an executive producer at Good Harper Films.

== Early life and education ==
Originally from Río Gallegos, Argentina, Schenfelt began working in digital media as a teenager by launching a fan site for The Twilight Saga, which attracted over one million followers.

Schenfelt moved to Los Angeles in 2016 and studied Music Business at UCLA.

== Career ==
In Argentina, Schenfelt founded The W List, a digital marketing agency.

She serves as an executive producer at Good Harper Films. Schenfelt’s work has been featured in several Spanish-language publications including Todo Noticias, Infobae, La Opinión (Argentina) etc.
