= Miguel Bonasso =

Argentinian writer, journalist and politician

Miguel Luis Bonasso
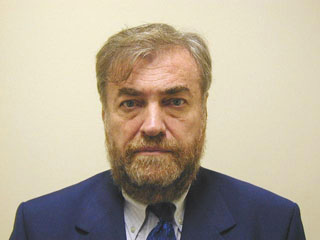
- Born: May 17, 1940 (age 86); Buenos Aires
- Occupations: guerrilla leader, writer, politician

Miguel Luis Bonasso (born 17 May 1940) is a former Argentine guerrilla leader, writer and politician. He was part of Montoneros during the 1970s. After the returning of democracy in Argentina, he was elected national deputy and started a career as a journalist and writer on topics related to the National Reorganization Process and politics in general.

He was born in Buenos Aires. He started as journalist for the magazine Leoplan, and later became editor in chief of many Peronist magazines and newspapers. He worked for La Opinión, and after the democracy era in Argentina, for Página 12. As member of Montoneros in the 1970s he was in charge of the area of press and communication with Rodolfo Walsh and Juan Gelman, but he started to have disagreements with some leaders of the organization such as Mario Firmenich.

He was elected a national deputy of Argentina as member of a small Peronist party allied with Jorge Telerman, and served between 2003 and 2011, representing Buenos Aires.
