= Olé (sports newspaper) =

Sports newspaper based in Argentina

- Argentina qualified for the 2018 World Cup, as covered by Olé, 10 October 2017
- Type: Daily sports newspaper
- Owner: Grupo Clarín
- Editor: Mariano Dayan
- Founded: May 23, 1996
- Language: Spanish
- Headquarters: Buenos Aires

Olé is an Argentine national daily sports newspaper published in Buenos Aires. The publication was launched on May 23, 1996, by the Clarín Group. It has since become the most important sports publication in Argentina, especially since the closing of El Gráfico in 2002 (later reopened as a monthly magazine). Shortly after its establishment, the publication received three awards from the Society for News Design (1997).

Olé is mainly focused on association football, but covers most sports events related to Argentina, as well as the most important international sport news.

== Overview ==
From the beginning, the newspaper was characterized by a style that combined ease with the informative display. During its first three years the newspaper met several editorial milestones, and was awarded various prizes for its innovative design concept.

In October 1997, Olé won three awards for excellence from the Society of Newspaper Designers (SND), which is based in the United States and is the world's leading reference in this area. When it awarded Olé, the SND described the newspaper as the most interesting editorial appearance in recent times in the Latin American press.

== Controversies ==
During its first year of life, after the Argentina Olympic football team qualification to the final of the 1996 Olympic Games, the newspaper published on Wednesday July 31, 1996 the headline "Let the macaques come", in reference to the remaining semifinal match played between the teams of Brazil and Nigeria. Due to the criticism received by the headline, the newspaper had to publish an apology, although it did not face any consequences.

On May 12, 2009, Olé published on its front page an article based on a flag seen, according to the newspaper, at the River Plate Stadium the previous Sunday, on the occasion of the match between the local team and Lanús. According to the photo published, that flag referred to River Plate's executives as "the worst in the history". However, the original flag referred to the team's defenders. The photo published had been digitally modified by a River Plate fan and previously published on a blogsite.
