= San Pedro, Buenos Aires =

San Pedro
- City
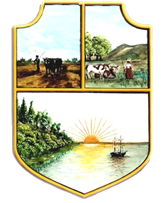
- Coat of arms

- Location within Argentina
- Coordinates: 33°40′45″S 59°40′01″W
- Country: Argentina
- Province: Buenos Aires
- Partido: San Pedro
- Founded: 1748

Government
  - Intendant: Cecilio Salazar (Cambiemos)
- Elevation: 31 m (102 ft)

Population (2010)
  - Total: 47,452
  - Density: 447/km^{2} (1,160/sq mi)
- CPA Base: B 2930
- Area code: +54 03329
- Website: sanpedro.gov.ar

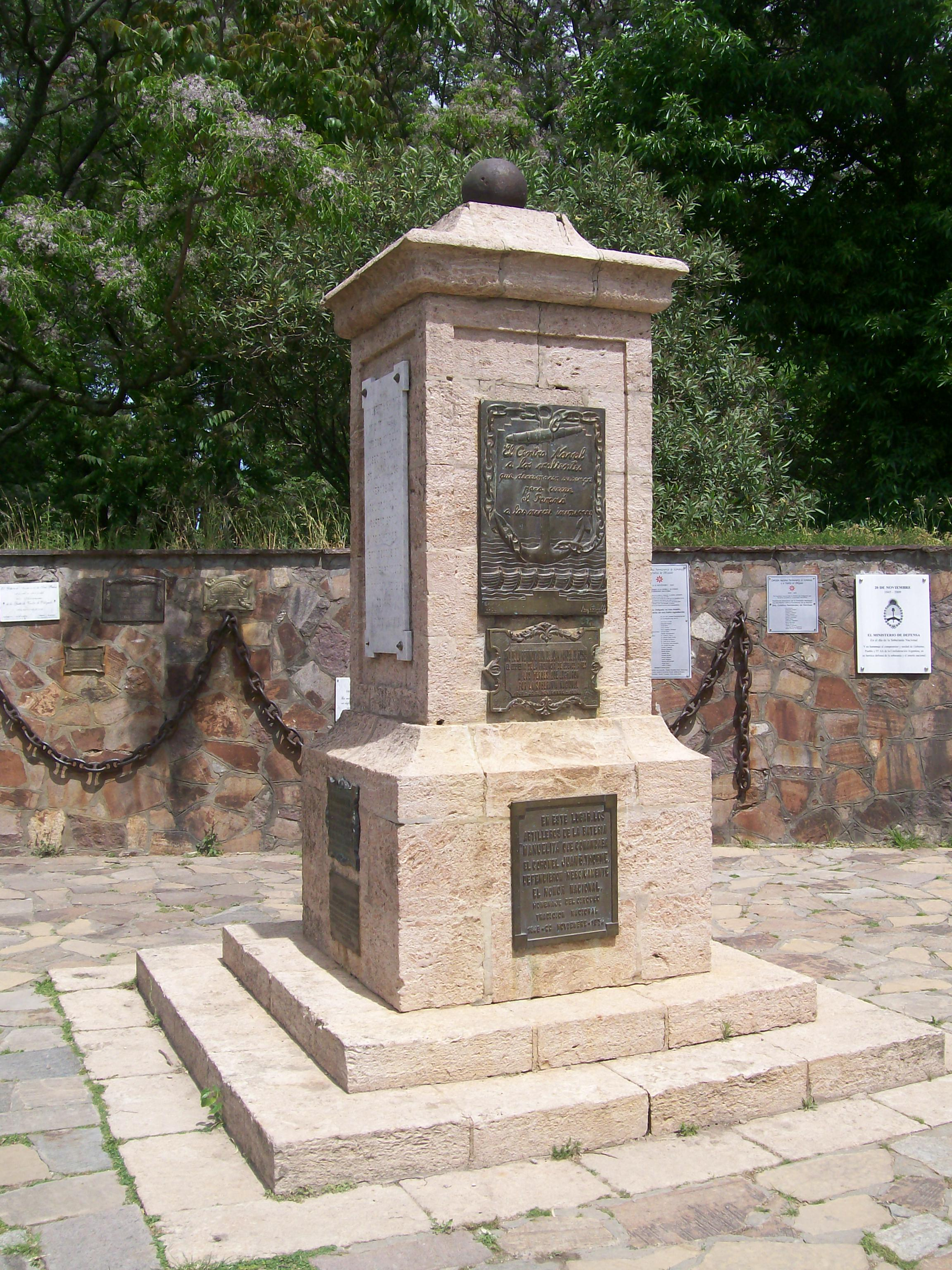
Memorial to the Battle of Vuelta de Obligado of 1845

San Pedro, full name Rincón de San Pedro Dávila de los Arrecifes, is a city and port in the Province of Buenos Aires, Argentina, beside the Paraná River. It is one of five localidades in the Partido de San Pedro and its administrative seat. It is 164 km from Buenos Aires via National Route 9, and 141 km from Rosario.

== Economy ==
San Pedro is located in the industrial corridor between Buenos Aires and Rosario, and is readily accessible to both via National Highway 9, as well as by the Mitre Railway Line. Natural harbors along San Pedro's Paraná River shores contributed to its early development as a trading hub, and later to its industrial base, and the city is today home to an important port.

Among the service sector activities that stand out in San Pedro is tourism, since the city is a frequent weekend destination for visitors from Buenos Aires. San Pedro draws tourism with its well-preserved nineteenth century architecture, as well as from the surrounding natural beauty. A marina and numerous riverfront hotels have opened in recent decades, notably a Howard Johnson's, and San Pedro is a leading regional destination for water sports enthusiasts in Argentina.

San Pedro is known for its fruit production, being the main products oranges and peaches, in that order. Another typical product from San Pedro is the ensaïmada, a pastry of Mallorcan origin, and the city has been declared "National Capital of the Argentine Ensaimada."

== History ==
The foundation of San Pedro can be traced to 1637, when a document signed by Pedro Esteban Dávila (Knight of the Order of Santiago, Governor and General Captain), established an outpost on the site, and with its current name. The land was deeded to Captain Juan Gutiérrez de Humanes in 1641 for his services to the Crown. San Pedro began as a settlement on August 26, 1748, when construction began on the Antigüo Convento Recoleto de Franciscanos, around which the original settlement developed. The parish of San Pedro was created in 1778, and on December 30, 1784, the Partido (County) was officially established.

The historic Battle of Vuelta de Obligado took place on the town's Paraná River shores on November 20, 1845. The city is home to a sizable Italian Argentine community, who established the local Sociedad Italiana de Unión y Benevolencia, a charitable organization, in 1873. San Pedro was officially designated as a city by the Provincial Legislature on July 25, 1907. A former Querandí settlement, a vestige of the area's original inhabitants, was unearthed nearby by archaeologists in 1965. The nation's largest newsprint maker, Papel Prensa, established its principal facility in San Pedro in 1978.

== Culture ==
The city is home to an active trade by artisans; the host a weekly fair on the Parque Artistico, and a selection of their works can be seen in the Sueño del Tano Museum. Other local museums include the Museum of Paleontology, the Fernando García Curten Museum, and the Osvaldo "Pato" Morresi Museum; Morresi (1952 — 94) was a champion Turismo Carretera stock car racer.

San Pedro has six FM radio stations, cable television service, and the newspapers El Imparcial, El Diario de San Pedro, and the weekly La Opinión.

=== Sanpedrinos fallen in the Falklands War ===
Numerous Sanpedrinos fought in the ill-fated Falklands War of 1982, and in 2005, the City Council passed a resolution in their honor. These included:

- Sbert, Mateo Antonio (1964-†1982): Assistant Sergeant in the Engineers Corps. Fought in the Comandos Company 602, and died in combat on the zone of Top Malo House, near Bluff Cove.
- Magliotti, Sergio Daniel (1964-†1982): Sergeant, 2nd class, of the Argentine Navy in the cruiser ARA Belgrano, sunk by the Royal Navy submarine HMS Conqueror. His body lies in the South Atlantic Ocean.

=== Surviving local veterans of the Falklands War ===
- Ancharek, Domingo Faustino (1962): Argentine Army, 3rd Infantry Machinery Corps. Fought in Sapper Hill.
- Azimonti, Pablo Enrique (1962): Army, Logistic Battalion 10. Fought in Cerro Dos Hermanas.
- Cano, Sergio Rubén (1963): Navy, Nursery assistant on the ARA Bahía Paraíso, survey ship,
- Martínez, Jorge Pablo (1962): Navy, Cruise ARA General Manuel Belgrano gunner, sunk by torpedoes from the submarine HMS Conqueror. Marooned on a raft for 48 hs, and rescued by the ARA Gurruchaga, auxiliary ship.
- Montorfano, Adrian Oscar (1962): Army, Chief of the 3rd Infantry Machinery Corps, La Tablada. Fought in Sapper Hill and Monte William.
- Novaro, Domingo Ángel (1961): Army, Mounted Grenadier, Coronel Pringles Squad. Fought in Cerro Dos Hermanas; operator-aimer of Browning MAG 7,62 mm next the Infantry Corp 4.
- Ramírez, Raúl Horacio (1962): Navy, ARA General Manuel Belgrano gunner. Fought in the South Atlantic theater; sank, and rescued by the ARA Bahía Paraíso after 48 hs on a raft.
- Ríos, Victor Hugo (1962): Army, ARA General Manuel Belgrano. Rescued after 48 hs on a raft by the ARA Bahía Paraíso.
- Saucedo, Javier Huber (1963): Argentine Air Force, Río Gallegos Air Base. Fought in the Puerto Argentino Airport (Stanley), operating a bitube canon 20 mm.

== Climate ==
Climate data for San Pedro, Buenos Aires Province (1965–2017)
Month	Jan	Feb	Mar	Apr	May	Jun	Jul	Aug	Sep	Oct	Nov	Dec	Year
Record high °C (°F)	39.5 (103.1)	39.3 (102.7)	36.7 (98.1)	33.8 (92.8)	31.4 (88.5)	27.7 (81.9)	31.0 (87.8)	34.0 (93.2)	34.8 (94.6)	35.8 (96.4)	38.7 (101.7)	40.7 (105.3)	40.7 (105.3)
Mean daily maximum °C (°F)	30.2 (86.4)	28.8 (83.8)	26.6 (79.9)	22.9 (73.2)	19.3 (66.7)	15.9 (60.6)	15.5 (59.9)	17.7 (63.9)	19.9 (67.8)	22.9 (73.2)	26.0 (78.8)	28.9 (84.0)	22.9 (73.2)
Daily mean °C (°F)	24.0 (75.2)	22.8 (73.0)	20.7 (69.3)	17.1 (62.8)	13.8 (56.8)	10.8 (51.4)	10.3 (50.5)	11.8 (53.2)	14.0 (57.2)	17.1 (62.8)	20.1 (68.2)	22.8 (73.0)	17.1 (62.8)
Mean daily minimum °C (°F)	17.6 (63.7)	16.9 (62.4)	15.0 (59.0)	11.6 (52.9)	8.7 (47.7)	6.0 (42.8)	5.4 (41.7)	6.2 (43.2)	8.0 (46.4)	11.2 (52.2)	13.8 (56.8)	16.4 (61.5)	11.4 (52.5)
Record low °C (°F)	6.7 (44.1)	6.4 (43.5)	2.6 (36.7)	0.0 (32.0)	−4.3 (24.3)	−6.9 (19.6)	−4.8 (23.4)	−4.8 (23.4)	−3.2 (26.2)	−0.8 (30.6)	1.6 (34.9)	4.9 (40.8)	−6.9 (19.6)
Average precipitation mm (inches)	118.3 (4.66)	126.3 (4.97)	128.2 (5.05)	97.7 (3.85)	64.6 (2.54)	44.2 (1.74)	45.7 (1.80)	43.2 (1.70)	63.6 (2.50)	117.4 (4.62)	111.5 (4.39)	110.7 (4.36)	1,071.4 (42.18)
Average precipitation days	7.4	7.5	7.8	7.4	5.9	5.4	5.1	5.0	5.8	8.3	7.7	8.1	81.0
Average relative humidity (%)	69	74	76	79	81	82	81	76	73	73	69	67	75
Mean monthly sunshine hours	285.2	237.3	232.5	189.0	170.5	144.0	158.1	182.9	195.0	223.2	261.0	275.9	2,554.6
Percentage possible sunshine	65	63	61	57	53	48	50	54	55	56	63	62	57
Source: Instituto Nacional de Tecnología Agropecuaria

== Historic buildings ==
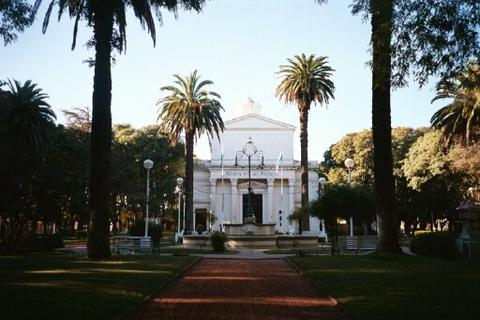
Nuestra Señora del Socorro, the city's main Catholic parish.

- Nuestra Señora del Socorro Church, 1872, in Italianate style.
- Municipal Palace, with its Regional Museum.
- Ramos Generales Dutra (general store); created in 1865, was declared by the City Council as a "Place of Local Historical Interest."
- The Rafael Obligado Popular Library, established in 1872 and housed in an Italianate building completed in 1921.
- The site of the 1845 Battle of Vuelta de Obligado.
