= Carburando =

Argentine media dedicated to motorsport

Carburando is an Argentine media dedicated to motorsport, mainly national auto racing. It started in 1960 as a radio show and then made its way onto television and the internet. Today it belongs to Clarín Group.

== Awards ==
- 2001, 2005, 2011 and 2016 Martín Fierro Award to Best sports program.
