= Río Gallegos Air Base =

Argentine Air Force base

- Base Aérea Militar Río Gallegos
- Río Gallegos, Santa Cruz in Argentina

Site information
- Type: Argentine Air Force Base
- Owner: Argentina
- Operator: Argentine Air Force

Location
- Coordinates: 51.6075°S 69.318°W

Site history
- Built: June 24, 1952
- In use: 1952 – present
- Fate: Operational

Río Gallegos Air Base is a main military airfield in Santa Cruz Province, Argentina in the far south of the nation.

It was the nearest air base to the Falklands Islands in the 1982 war.

== History ==
It opened in June 1952.

== Falklands War ==
Ernesto Horacio Crespo, the head of the F.A.S, coordinated attacks on the islands from the base, which was 380 miles to the west of the Falklands Islands.
