= Los Andes (Argentine newspaper) =

Argentinian broadsheet daily newspaper

Coordinates: 32°53′28.4″S 68°50′22″W

Diario Los Andes
- Type: Daily newspaper
- Format: Broadsheet
- Owner(s): Grupo Clarín (80%); Calle Family (20%)
- Editor: Gerardo Heidel
- Founded: 20 October 1882
- Political alignment: Conservatism
- Headquarters: Mendoza, Argentina
- Circulation: 30,000
- Website: www.losandes.com.ar

Los Andes is an Argentine daily newspaper published in the city of Mendoza. The newspaper was founded in 1882 by Adolfo Calle. It is not related to the Los Andes newspaper in Peru.

In September 1995, it became the first Argentine newspaper to become available on the internet.
