= Radio Mitre =

Radio station in Buenos Aires, Argentina

Radio Mitre (LR6)
- Buenos Aires; Argentina
- Frequency: 790 kHz

Programming
- Format: Talk radio, Sports radio

Ownership
- Owner: Clarín Group
- Sister stations: La 100; Mía FM; FM del Lago; Radio X

History
- First air date: August 16, 1925 (as LOZ Broadcasting La Nación)

Technical information
- Class: A
- ERP: 100 kW

Links
- Website: Radio Mitre

LR6 Radio Mitre is a radio station in the city of Buenos Aires, Argentina. It is owned and operated by Clarín Group.

It was created on August 16, 1925 under the name of The Nation Broadcasting LOZ.

During the government of Juan Domingo Perón, it was nationalized and eventually re-privatized in October 1983.

In 1985, it moved to its current facility in 2668 Mansilla, Recoleta. In 1992, it was acquired by Grupo Clarín.

Transmits on 790 kHz AM. There is a representative of the radio in the city of Cordoba called Mitre 810.
