= Papel Prensa =

Papel Prensa, S.A.
- Type: Public-private partnership
- Industry: Newsprint
- Founded: 1972; 54 years ago
- Headquarters: Bartolomé Mitre 739; Buenos Aires
- Key people: Héctor Magnetto, President and Director; Julio César Saguier, Vice President and Director; Enrique Pigretti, CEO
- Products: Newsprint, printing paper, writing paper
- Revenue: ▲US$ 94 million (2009)
- Net income: ▲US$ 4 million (2009)
- Total assets: ▲US$ 111 million (2009)
- Owner: Clarín Group (49%); La Nación (22.49%); Argentine State (28.08%)
- Number of employees: 300 (2009)
- Website: papelprensa.com

Papel Prensa S.A. is an Argentine manufacturing company, being the largest producer of newsprint in the country. The company furnishes 58% of the local market in the staple. The public–private partnership became the focus of one of a series of controversies between Clarín and Kirchnerism (the ruling Argentine political faction) in 2010.

The company is currently owned by Clarín Group (49%), La Nación (22.49%), and the Argentine State (28.08%).

== History ==
=== Establishment ===
Papel Prensa (literally "Press Paper," loosely "newsprint") originated in the establishment of the Paper and Cellulose Production Development Fund in 1969 by the then de facto President Juan Carlos Onganía. The plan envisaged the establishment of a public-private newsprint manufacturing facility that could substitute imports of the staple which, excluding Papelera Tucumán, accounted for practically the entire annual demand of over 340,000 metric tons; the nation's 179 news dailies had a combined circulation of nearly 4.3 million in 1970, the second-largest in Latin America, and the highest on a per capita basis.

The fund stipulated the enactment of a 10% excise tax on all imported newsprint for a ten-year period, during which the state would retain a share in the company. A bidding process was launched in 1971 for the plant's development, though none of the bids met the capacity requirements, and its construction was assigned to the Ministry of Industry. The company itself was formally established on July 12, 1972, with a 27% ownership by the state, and the remainder by a consortium led by publisher César Civita and the company he directed, Editorial Abril.

Civita and Editorial Abril sold their shares in late 1973 to a consortium led by banker and developer David Graiver who, through partner Rafael Ianover, became the firm's largest private shareholder. Secretly, however, Graiver acted as the investment banker for the Montoneros guerrilla group. He reportedly laundered US$17 million in funds that the Montoneros had received from illicit activities, principally kidnapping. These investments included a variety of interests in both Argentina and overseas, and by 1976, Graiver owned a significant stake in Jacobo Timerman's La Opinión (one of the leading newspapers and the leading magazine publisher in Argentina), as well as numerous other businesses and banks in Argentina, New York City, and elsewhere. Graiver contracted US$67 million in debts, however, and reportedly died in a plane crash near Acapulco on August 7, 1976. He was indicted for embezzlement in 1978 by Manhattan district attorney Robert Morgenthau, who believed the elusive banker possibly to be alive.

=== Sale and controversy ===
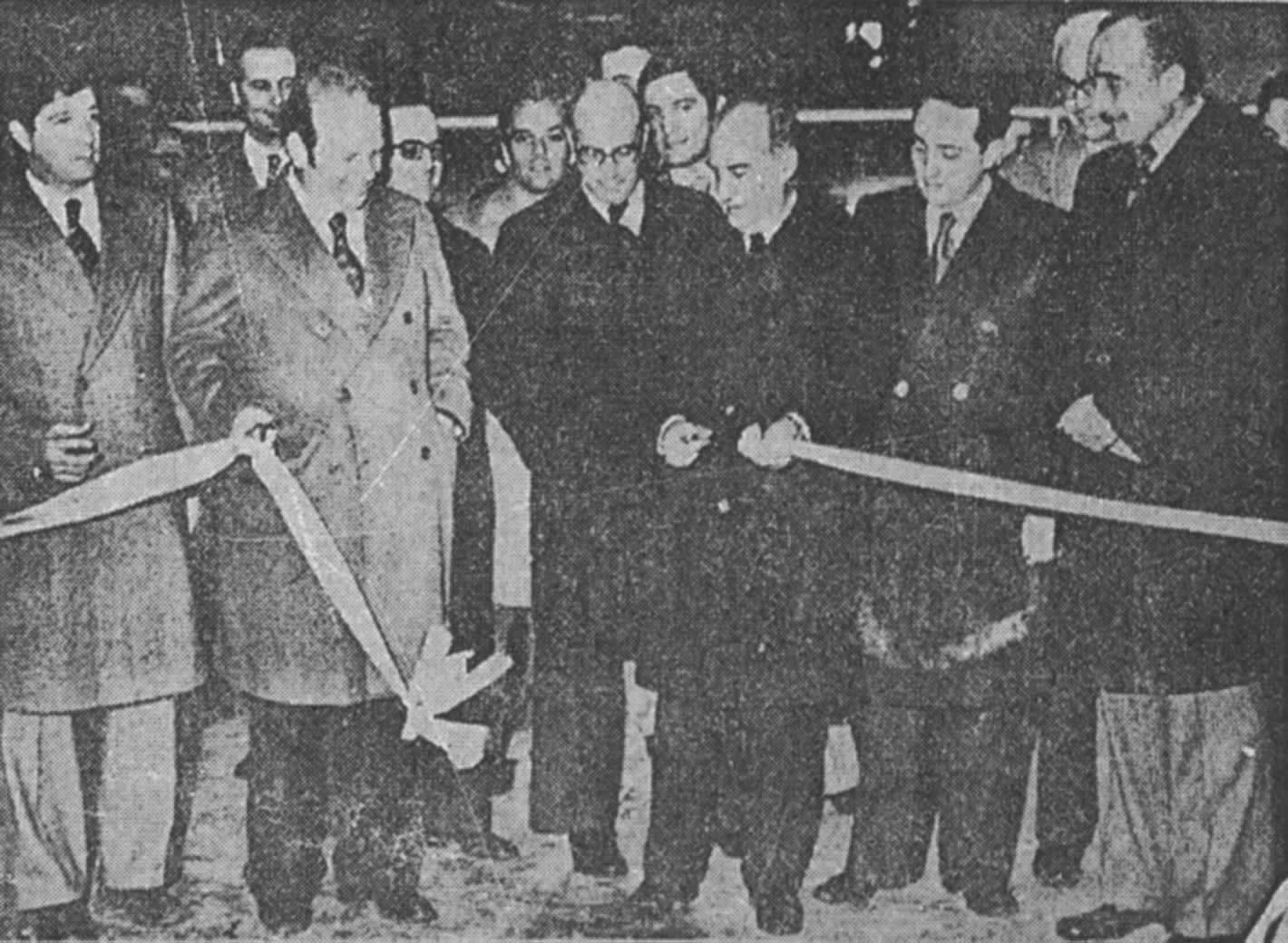
Bartolomé Mitre IV of La Nación (2nd from left), Industry Secretary Raymundo Podestá (holding ribbon), and Héctor Magnetto of Clarín (2nd from right) inaugurate the Papel Prensa factory in San Pedro in 1978.

His widow, Lidia Papaleo, returned to Argentina on September 16, and was enjoined by the newly installed dictatorship to sell her family's stake in Papel Prensa, as was Ianover. She was also coerced by the Montoneros, who sought to recover the US$17 million investment managed by Graiver. A military tribunal sentenced Papaleo and Graiver's brother and father to 15 years' imprisonment, though an appeals court later cleared the defendants of all charges.

Papaleo and the other private partners negotiated the sale of their shares on November 2 with the three most important Argentine newspaper publishers at the time (Clarín, La Nación, and La Razón). Papaleo, however, had collected but U$S 7,000 when, on March 14, 1977, she was illegally detained by the Buenos Aires Province Police. Papel Prensa, which at the time was not operational, received a significant injection of capital during a period of state receivership that ended in January 1978, and on September 27, its San Pedro facility was inaugurated, substituting around US$90 million annually in newsprint imports. The private shareholders of Papel Prensa, including Graiver's widow, were ultimately indemnified by President Raúl Alfonsín's administration in 1985.

The Clarín Media Group acquired La Razón and its underlying shares in Papel Prensa in 2000, raising its stake to 49 percent; the Argentine government maintained its 27.5% share. Clarín and La Nación together accounted for 71% of the company's sales in 2011. Newspaper circulation declined in Argentina after the 1970s, but production at Papel Prensa remained below local market needs for the nation's 170 dailies and newsprint imports remained at around 80,000 tons annually in 2011. Production at Papel Prensa, moreover, continued to decline. The San Pedro facility produced 170,000 tons of newsprint (75% of the Argentine market) in 2009, and 145,000 tons (58% of the market) by 2011.

=== Renewed accusations ===
Amid a series of political controversies between Clarín and Kirchnerism, Papaleo testified in 2010 to having been personally threatened by Clarín executive Héctor Magnetto during the sale, and subsequently tortured by police to forfeit further payment, as well as her remaining shares in La Opinión. Charges were filed to the effect of the sale's alleged illegality by the federal government in August 2010, a decision the company's directors claimed was a government attempt to control the still-significant newspaper media. Papaleo, however, recanted her testimony within days, affirming simply that she had been pressured to sell her shares, though never under duress. This latter assertion was echoed by Isidoro Graiver (her brother-in-law) and by María Sol Graiver (the couple's daughter). Her brother, Osvaldo Papaleo, reiterated claims that the sale of Graiver's Papel Prensa shares was arranged under pain of death, and that ulterior motives explained the recent retractions.

A joint declaration by Clarín and La Nación dismissed these reports, pointing out that the kidnappings and the Papel Prensa sale had already been investigated after the restoration of democracy in 1983. The courts at the time found no link between the Gravier kidnapping and the sale, nor any irregularities in the sale itself. Lidia and Osvaldo Papaleo and Rafael Ianover testified in court at the time regarding the abuses made against them by the dictatorship, and did not report any of the incidents they reported in 2010. Bartolomé Mitre (director of La Nación) and Héctor Magnetto (CEO of Clarín) accused the Secretary of Human Rights of tampering with the 1988 judicial ruling, adding new lines absent in the original copy to suggest favoritism by the Junta for the benefit of their newspapers. A line in the original document, for instance, that said "The problem with the price, however, is intrascendent to the scope of this body, and besides, it was accepted by the sellers -The Gravier Group- and has only been mentioned to prove the hurry to negotiate" was claimed by Mitre and Magnetto to have been amended by surreptitiously turning a period into a comma, and by adding "and the existence of a single buyer imposed or chosen by the national authorities."

These controversies coincided with a highly politicized six-month work stoppage at the San Pedro plant amid accusations of abnormally high pay for managerial staff. The strike ended following wage increases agreed to in early December.

Magnetto, Mitre and Noble were declared innocent in 2016. Judge Julián Ercolini ruled that there was not enough evidence of any wrongdoing to accuse them.

=== Expropriation bill ===
The FPV won the 2011 election by a wide margin, and obtained a majority of both houses of Congress. With this majority, the FPV presented a bill to expropriate the company from Clarín and La Nación, by declaring the production and distribution of newsprint of national interest. This would allow the government to increase its holdings of company stock, purchasing a majority stake and thus obtaining the control of Papel Prensa; the bill aims to regulate the import of paper as well. The bill was rejected by all the other parties, which alleged it was unconstitutional and had the aim of imposing indirect limits on freedom of the press.
