= Conflict between Kirchnerism and the media =

Media bias controversies during the Kirchner Presidencies

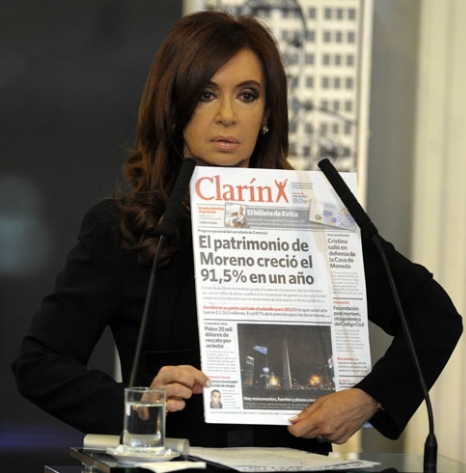
President Cristina Fernández de Kirchner with a Clarín newspaper

The Argentine Governments of Néstor Kirchner and Cristina Fernández de Kirchner had several conflicts with major media groups. Kirchner accused the Clarín Group, La Nación, Perfil, and related media of having promoted their overthrow.

== Background ==
The president and most of her cabinet increasingly avoided press conferences and interviews with independent media, relying instead on Twitter, press statements, and public service announcements to communicate with the populace. Large media groups, particularly the Clarín Group, in turn opposed anti-trust laws enacted during her administration.

Critics maintain that new legislation passed by the Congress would be selectively applied against dissenting media and journalists, while fostering a proliferation of supportive media. Supporters maintained in turn that media consolidation has become the greater threat to freedom of the press in Argentina and elsewhere in Latin America, and that measures such those abolishing media laws dating from the country's last dictatorship and rescinding criminal penalties for defamation and libel of the president, promote freedom of expression.

Other press advocacy groups, such as the Argentine Journalist Forum (FOPEA) and the Committee to Protect Journalists, observed that the dispute polarized news media and public opinion to the point that accuracy and objectivity in the media itself had become jeopardized.

== Initial conflicts ==
The conflict started in 2008, during a period in which the government was in open confrontation with the agricultural sector over a propose hike in oilseed export taxes. The Clarín Group, led by CEO Héctor Magnetto, strongly supported the sector, and their newspapers published articles that were considered favorable to the "ruralists" or chacareros. At least one writer who worked for one of the conglomerate's dailies (Enrique Lacolla of La Voz del Interior) was dismissed for submitting an op ed opposing the landowners' lockout of April 2008.

The president reacted with strong criticism of the role of media, questioning whether freedom of speech "belonged to corporations or to ordinary citizens." The Government sent its "Resolution 125" to Congress, which after an 18-hour Senate debate, fell in a tie vote broken by the Vice President Julio Cobos in a surprise vote against the executive branch resolution.

Another source of contention with the government arose when the Clarín Group was denied regulatory support for the planned acquisition in 2008 of a controlling stake in Telecom Argentina, which would have given the media group a dominant position in domestic internet, television, and phone services. La Nación was likewise at odds with the federal government over an injunction issued in October 2003 that allowed it to continue in subsequent years to claim an expired corporate tax credit on payroll taxes paid; were the injunction to be lifted, a 280 million-peso (US$50 million) tax debt, including interest, would result.

== Nationalization of football broadcasting ==
The television broadcasting rights for all Argentine football (Note: Football or fútbol (Spanish), is what in the United States is commonly known as soccer.) league matches had been held by the Clarín Group cable channel TyC Sports since 1992. That contract was terminated by the Argentine Football Association in August 2009, and broadcasts of all league matches were acquired by the government and made freely available as Fútbol para Todos ("Football for All") on public television. These broadcasts were afterwards used to provide advertising for the government, and with the single exception of Iveco no advertisements from nongovernmental sources were aired after March 2010. Football broadcasting remained on terrestrial television until 2017, when the Mauricio Macri administration chose not to renew the deal with AFA. The rights were purchased by Turner Broadcasting System and Fox Networks Group and the matches started to be broadcast on premium television.

== Audiovisual Media Law ==
In October 2009, the Argentine National Congress approved Law 26.522, known as the "Audiovisual Media Law" but usually described as the "K Law" by the Clarín Group. The new law served to deregulate the television and radio industries which until then were still limited to the few channels created by the media law enacted in 1980. A series of five judicial appeals and injunctions prevented it from coming into force for almost a year. The Supreme Court ruled against one of those appeals, declaring that it created a precedent where "a single legislator could not challenge an act of Congress, (Note: The single legislator who acted in this case, was Enrique Thomas (Federal Peronism, Mendoza Province).) nor judges use their authority to stop the application of an entire law." The antitrust provisions of the law remained blocked subsequently via injunctions.

A court ruling in December 2012 ruled that the Clarín Group's television and radio licenses cannot be sold until the Argentine Supreme Court can rule on the constitutionality of articles 45 and 161, which limit the number of licenses companies can hold and which establish a divestment procedure for companies who hold more than 24 cable television licenses and 10 free-to-air radio or television licenses. The Argentine government claims the Clarín Group has over 200 licenses; Grupo Clarín claims the number is 158. The Supreme Court ultimately upheld the constitutionality of the Audiovisual Media Law in its entirety on October 29, 2013.

Frank LaRue, the UN Special Rapporteur on Freedom of Expression, supports the new law, which replaces the law enacted in 1980 under the National Reorganization Process dictatorship, as "an example for the entire continent." A majority of journalist respondents in a 2011 Argentine Journalism Forum (FOPEA) survey considered the new law a partial or even substantial progress compared to the previous one.

== Marcela and Felipe Noble Herrera ==
Marcela and Felipe Noble Herrera are adopted children of Ernestina Herrera de Noble, the largest shareholder of the Clarín Group. It was suspected that they may be children of people murdered during the Dirty War. The President pledged to "personally" go to international courts to seek justice done if Argentine judges did not rule on the case.

Charges of illicit adoption were not ultimately proven by DNA tests against the available pool of data, and the Grandmothers of the Plaza de Mayo NGO, who advocated for these tests, celebrated that the case was at least taken up in court. Estela Barnes de Carlotto also considered that the case will remain open, as further tests will be done as new families submit blood samples. The Noble Herrera lawyers motioned instead that the case against Ernestina Herrera de Noble be closed, as happened with all the similar cases when the DNA tests gave negative results. The case was finally closed in January 2016.

== Cablevisión ==
Cable television reaches two out of three Argentine households, and is at the center of debate over the 2009 Audiovisual Media Law. The Clarín Group's cable TV unit, Cablevisión, merged with rival Multicanal in 2007 and since then controls the majority of the cable market in Argentina, including a 90% share of cable households in Buenos Aires, Córdoba, and Santa Fe Provinces (the three largest); potential competitors have likewise been stifled by predatory pricing and by Cablevisión's control of 97% of the fiber-optic cable mileage in Argentina.

Besides the Media Law, the federal government has used its regulatory power over rates against Cablevisión; when Cablevisión and DirecTV intended to increase subscriber rates in March 2010, the Argentine government appealed. Subsequently, in August 2010, a Federal Judge (Note: The federal court involved was Cámara de Apelaciones in the Contencioso Administrativo, Nº 3.) supported the government decision and prevented the two companies from changing their basic rates. Cablevisión later disregarded a February 2011 order by the Federal Audioviual Services Authority that the INCAA, CN23, and TeleSUR networks be included in its lineup; children's programming channel Pakapaka was likewise excluded, but was added in May as part of the "premium plan." A court ruling in June 2013 enjoined Cablevisión to reorganize its channel lineup and to include the hitherto excluded channels.

== Papel Prensa ==
Papel Prensa is the largest Argentine producer of newsprint. The company is owned by the newspapers Clarín and La Nación, with a 27.5% share owned by the Argentine government. President Cristina Fernández de Kirchner alleged that the sale of Papel Prensa by the family of the late David Graiver in 1976 was done so by illicit means and in collusion with the dictatorship to take advantage of its use against other Argentine newspapers, as well as toeing the dictatorship line when covering the Dirty War in which up to 30,000 people were forcibly disappeared. The government presented a report, Papel Prensa: The Truth, claiming that during the Dirty War, while being coerced, the Graivers were forced to sell Papel Prensa at a bargain price.

Shortly afterward Isidoro Graiver denied the charges, stating that the sale of the company took place while his brothers were free, and that their detention was not related to Papel Prensa but with their link to the Montoneros guerrilla group. He had made statements to the contrary one month earlier, and was therefore later accused of being manipulated by Clarín.

The Nunca Más report, published in 1984 by the National Commission on the Disappearance of Persons, contains no information about the Graivers being forced to give away their property. Michael Soltys, editor of the Buenos Aires Herald newspaper declared: "Papel Prensa is an anachronistic holdover from the military dictatorship which should not continue any further into the 21st century; but not this way. It is not only that the government is at least as interested a party when it comes to controlling newsprint — if this control is established on such a mendacious basis, the Cristina Fernández de Kirchner administration is not so much seeking the truth as to be the owner of the truth." On same day of its announcement, the government sent the report to the National Congress and the Judiciary for further investigation.

Another source of contention between the government and its private partners in Papel Prensa is that production at the firm's San Pedro facility has been well below capacity and declining, leading to increasing imports of a staple considered one of national interest. A preferential pricing scale that allowed La Nación and the Clarín Group's numerous dailies to buy newsprint at a 25% discount while other dailies were charged prices based on expensive Chilean imports, was rescinded in 2010.

In April 2013 Congressman Carlos Kunkel presented a bill to expropriate the 24% of Papel Prensa, thereby raising the state's share to 51% and thus putting the newsprint maker under state control; the bill would dismiss all current board members and executives in Papel Prensa, and appoint new ones.

== Fibertel ==
Fibertel, a Broadband Internet access provider and part of the Clarín Group, (Note: Fibertel was an independent company 1997–2003 before its acquisition by the Clarín Group in 2003.) had its licence revoked in August 2010 by the government arguing that Clarín itself dissolved Fibertel in January 2009, merging the company with its TV cable network provider Cablevisión, and does not have a licence to provide Internet services by itself. The government gave a 90-day time limit to end operations and move current users to other providers. The case was taken to the courts to prevent Fibertel's closure, which would force 10% of the country's Internet users (Note: Fibertel is the third-largest ISP in Argentina with approximately 1,500,000 clients in 2012.) to change to a new service provider or get disconnected.

More controversy arose in September 2010 when the Government's Secretary of Communications office published a list of 389 Internet providers that could potentially replace Fibertel. The list, however, was totally outdated and resulted in only 22 companies still operating and only two Telcos with nationwide coverage: Telefónica de Argentina and Telecom Argentina.

Judge Ernesto Marinelli of the First National Court on Federal Administration Contentions was initially chosen to preside over the case, but declared himself in a "conflict of interest" because he was a Fibertel user. At the same time, the different factions in the National Congress were divided on the issue. Pino Solanas of the Proyecto Sur Party, for example, proposed that the country should have a new law to deregulate and promote all the communication services instead of regulating a single company.

== International notice ==
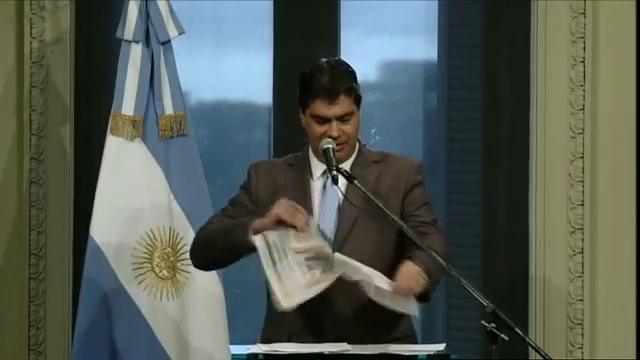
Cabinet Chief Jorge Capitanich destroying a copy of Clarín after accusing the newspaper of publishing false information.

The disputes over Fibertel and Papel Prensa took place nearly at the same time, and generated strong reaction from the international media. El País from Uruguay highlighted the confrontation between government and the Grupo Clarín media concern.

Criticism of the Argentine government included an editorial by Mary Anastasia O'Grady from The Wall Street Journal who said that Kirchnerism is "cracking down on the free press." Editorial comment from Spain's El País was of the opinion that Kirchnerism is "using methods similar to those of dictatorships to keep its power" by revisiting the Papel Prensa case.

Other voices echoed a different view, including editorial comments in El Tiempo from Colombia, declaring: "The government maintains that the company sells the paper to small newspapers at higher prices than those who buy Clarín and La Nación and considered these actions go against freedom of expression." UN Special Rapporteur on Freedom of Expression Frank LaRue also supports the new law; as does the world's largest federation of journalists, the International Federation of Journalists, whose director, Beth Costa, visited Martín Sabbatella of the AFSCA (the agency overseeing the Audiovisual Media Law) in August 2013 to express the IFJ's "support for and commitment to the media law and the defense of freedom of expression in Argentina."

In August 2010, U.S. Department of State Deputy Spokesman Mark Toner declared that the Barack Obama administration is closely following the controversy and that concerns about press freedom are taken seriously.

== Pro-government media and state advertising ==
The government has made increasing use of advertising during the Kirchner era. State publicity - at all levels of government - accounted for 1.8% of Argentina's 3 billion-peso (US$1 billion) ad market in 2003, but fully 8% of a 19.5 billion-peso (US$4.7 billion) ad market in 2011 - an almost twentyone-fold increase. The official budget for national government publicity in 2012 was 735.8 million pesos (US$160 million); the 2011 budget was $608.1 million (US$146 million). An administrative resolution increased that number by $4.7 million, a presidential decree added $112.8 million, and another administrative resolution allowed to use $10.2 million more. A General Audit Office (AGN) report showed that in 2009, the largely supportive Página 12 daily and Veintitrés Group received 18% and 13% of these revenues, respectively; while Clarín, La Nación, and La Razón received 15%, 8%, and 5% despite their much larger circulation.

Advertising is not the sole venue used by the government to broadcast publicity. The nationalized soccer broadcasts, whose commercial breaks feature mostly state ads, are officially budgeted at $690 million (US$150 million). A presidential decree allocated another $38.5 million, that with a loan of $25 million to the Argentine Football Association totals $753.5 million (US$165 million). The Ministry of Economy has a special budget for this purpose of $42.8 million. Nor is criticism of excessive ad spending limited to the federal government; a leading opponent, Buenos Aires Mayor Mauricio Macri, had the city spend over $86 million (US$20 million) in publicity during the first quarter of 2012 alone, dwarfing the 8 million pesos spent on city health and education infrastructure combined.

== See also ==
- Kirchnerism
- Public image of Cristina Fernández de Kirchner
- La Cámpora
- Plural Consensus
