= La Razón (Buenos Aires) =

Daily newspaper based in Argentina

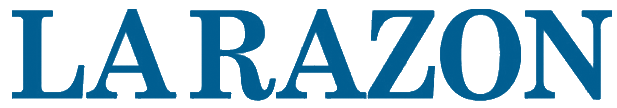
- Type: Daily newspaper
- Format: Tabloid
- Owner: Clarín Group
- Founded: March 1, 1905
- Ceased publication: December 29, 2017
- Political alignment: Centrist
- Headquarters: Buenos Aires, Argentina
- Circulation: 110,000
- Website: larazon.com.ar

La Razón was a local newspaper distributed in the public transport in Buenos Aires, Argentina.

== History ==
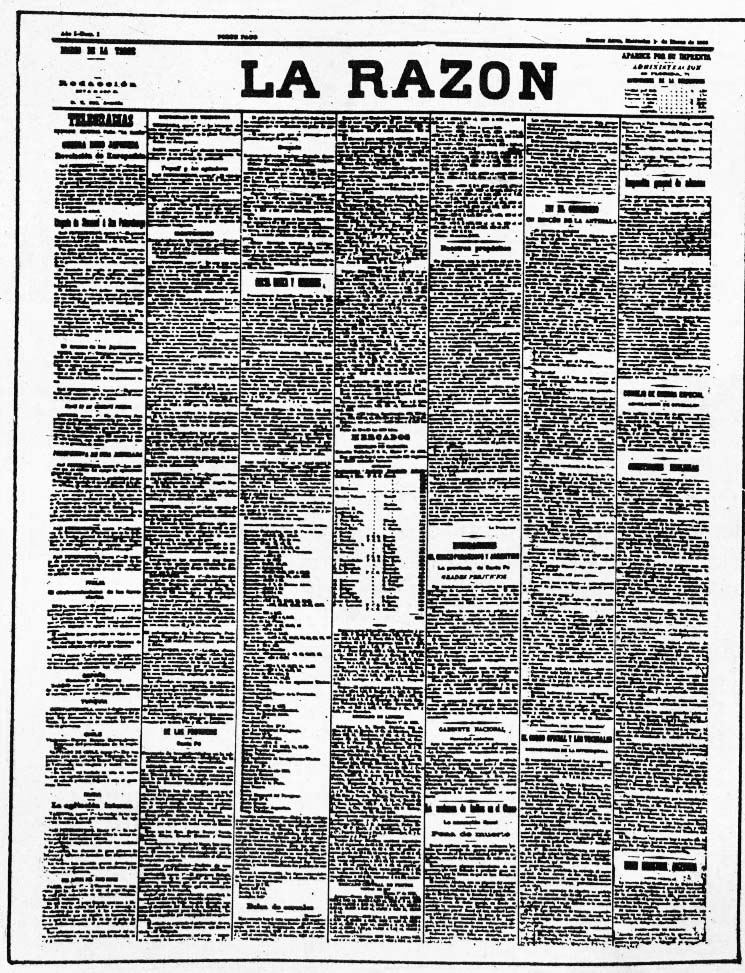
First edition, March 1, 1905.

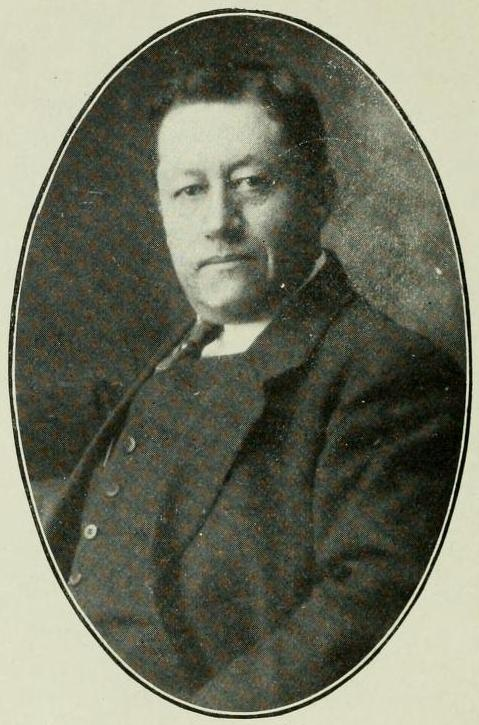
Emilio Morales

It was founded in 1905 by Argentine journalist Emilio Morales as an afternoon (Quinta edición) and evening (Sexta edición) newspaper in broadsheet format. The daily was acquired by a prominent news editor, José A. Cortejarena, in 1911 and became the first newspaper in Argentina owned by a journalist. Cortejarena died in 1921, and the paper was directed by Ángel L. Sojo, during whose tenure La Razón became known for scooping the city's numerous other papers. The daily also became the first to publish cartoonist Dante Quinterno's Patoruzú (an enduring Argentine comic strip) in 1928.

La Razón was acquired by Ricardo Peralta Ramos, the scion of the founding family of seaside Mar del Plata, in 1939. Peralta Ramos named Félix Laiño director, and the paper's broadsheet layout was reformatted and more heavily illustrated. The paper grew steadily, and La Razón was expropriated in 1947 by order of President Juan Perón, whose populist leadership had become increasingly autocratic. Controlled by influential First Lady Eva Perón, the paper displaced longtime circulation leader La Nación by 1952, when its daily distribution reached 500,000 copies (Latin America's largest). The dictatorship that displaced Perón in 1955 initially resolved to retain the lucrative daily, but were challenged in court by the Peralta Ramos family; the legal case presented by their attorney, Marcos Satanowsky, made La Razón one of the few such publications returned to its rightful owners, as many were reportedly resold by the regime to pliant buyers.

The paper inaugurated new printing installations in the pampas town of General Hornos, in 1964, and remained among the leading Argentine newspapers (second only to Clarín). Editor-in-chief Félix Laiño retired in 1984, and was replaced by former La Opinión publisher Jacobo Timerman, who had returned from exile in Israel, to where he fled after his abduction and torture by the last dictatorship, in 1977–79. Timerman downsized the ailing daily, and converted it into a morning paper, but a 1987 staff strike resulted in its closure.

La Razón was then acquired by the Buenos Aires City Council. The insolvent publication was converted into a free-distribution evening daily in tabloid format, and can be found most commonly in train and subway stations, as well in as coffee shops in Buenos Aires. It was acquired from the city by the Clarín Group, the country's largest media conglomerate, on December 27, 2000, and the paper reintroduced its morning edition in 2008.

== See also ==
- Clarín
- La Nación
