= La Nación =

Daily Spanish-language newspaper in Argentina

Coordinates: 34°36′03″S 58°22′08″W

- La Nación will be a tribune of doctrine.

- Front page on 19 October 2015
- Type: Daily newspaper
- Format: Tabloid on weekdays, broadsheet on weekends
- Owners: MNMS Holding; Mitre Family
- Founder: Bartolomé Mitre
- Publisher: Fernán Saguier
- Editor-in-chief: Pablo Sirvén
- Managing editor: Martín Rodríguez Yebra
- Opinion editor: Fernando Laborda
- Founded: 4 January 1870; 156 years ago
- Political alignment: Liberal conservatism
- Language: Spanish
- Headquarters: Vicente López, Buenos Aires Province, Argentina
- Circulation: 35,000 (2024)
- ISSN: 0325-0946
- Website: lanacion.com.ar

La Nación (transl. "The Nation") is an Argentine daily newspaper. As the country's leading conservative newspaper, La Nación's main competitor is the more liberal Clarín. It is regarded as a newspaper of record for Argentina.

Its motto is: "La Nación will be a tribune of doctrine." It is the second most read newspaper in print, behind Clarín, and the third in digital format, behind Infobae and Clarín. In addition, it has an application for Android and iOS phones.

The newspaper's printing plant is in the City of Buenos Aires and its newsroom is in Vicente López, Province of Buenos Aires.

The newsroom also acts as a studio for the newspaper's TV channel, LN+.

== Overview ==
The paper was founded on 4 January 1870 (replacing the former publication Nación Argentina), by former Argentine President Bartolomé Mitre and associates. Until 1914, the managing editor was José Luis Murature, Foreign Minister of Argentina from 1914-1916. Enjoying Latin America's largest readership until the 1930s, its daily circulation averaged around 350,000, and exceeded only by Crítica, a Buenos Aires tabloid. The 1945 launch of Clarín created a new rival, and following the 1962 closure of Crítica, and the 1975 suspension of Crónica, La Nación secured its position as the chief market rival of Clarín.

Originally published in Bartolomé Mitre's home (today, the Museo Mitre), its offices were moved a number of times until, in 1929, a Plateresque headquarters on Florida Street was inaugurated. The publishing group today is headquartered in the Bouchard Plaza Tower, a 26-storey Post-modern office building developed between 2000 and 2004 over the news daily's existing, six-storey building.

The director of La Nación, Bartolomé Mitre (the founder's great-great-grandson), shares control of ADEPA, the Argentine newspaper industry trade group, and of Papel Prensa, the nation's leading newsprint manufacturer, with Grupo Clarín. The newspaper was part of the conflict between Kirchnerism and the media, when Lidia Papaleo denounced, endorsed by the Kirchners, that they would have been forced to sell Papel Prensa under torture during the Dirty War. Judge Julián Ercolini acquitted him in 2016, pointing that there was no evidence to support the claim.

The decline of La Nación has run parallel with the loss of political and economic power of the landowning upper middle class. It is still a medium for its interests, but its circulation has been cut in half and sales are decreasing at an average of 8% per year.

In early 2012, La Nación bought ImpreMedia, the publisher of El Diario-La Prensa, La Opinión and other US-based Spanish-language newspapers. On October 30, 2016, La Nación announced a change in its printing format, with weekday editions now being printed as tabloids and weekend editions retaining the traditional broadsheet format.

== Awards ==
In 2019, the Society for News Design named La Nación as the World's Best Designed Newspaper, sharing the award together with The Sunday Times and The New York Times.

== Circulation ==
Logo of La Nación +, the newspaper group's television channel

La Nación's daily circulation averaged 165,166 in 2012, and still represented nearly 20% of the daily newspaper circulation in Buenos Aires; the paper is also distributed nationwide and around the world.

According to third-party web analytics providers Alexa and SimilarWeb, La Nación's website is the 9th and 17th most visited in Argentina respectively, as of August 2015. SimilarWeb rates the site as the 4th most visited news website in Argentina, attracting almost 32 million visitors per month.

== Gallery ==
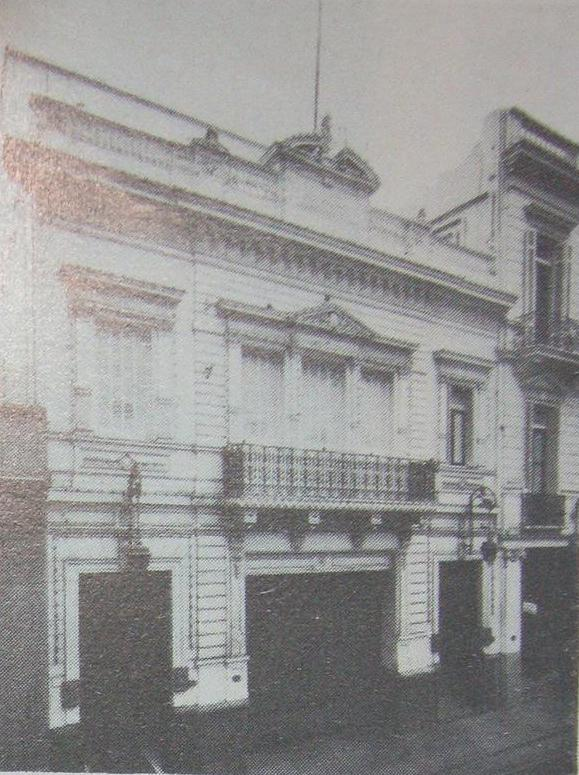
Former Building on San Martín 500

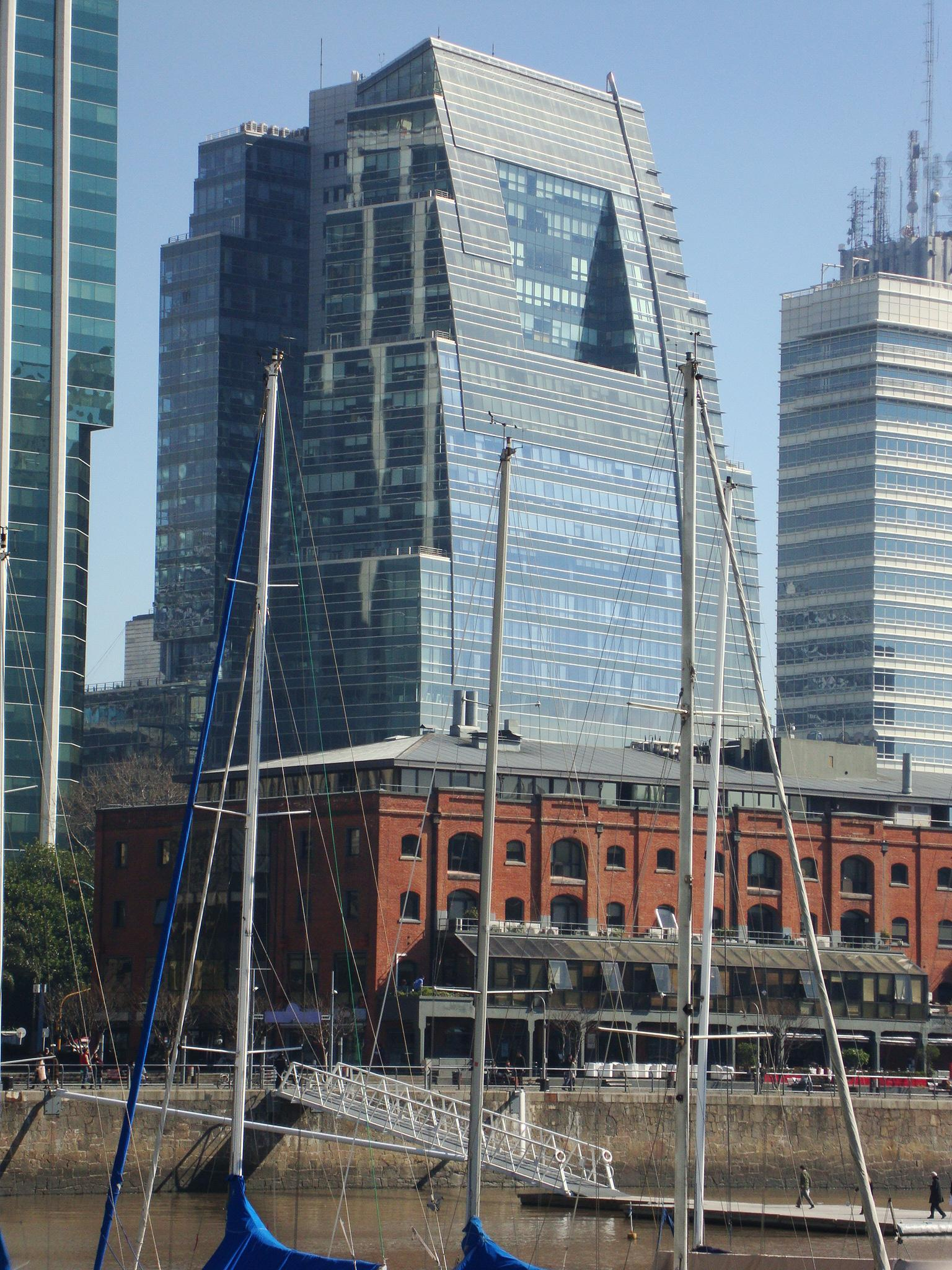
Former offices at Bouchard Plaza building

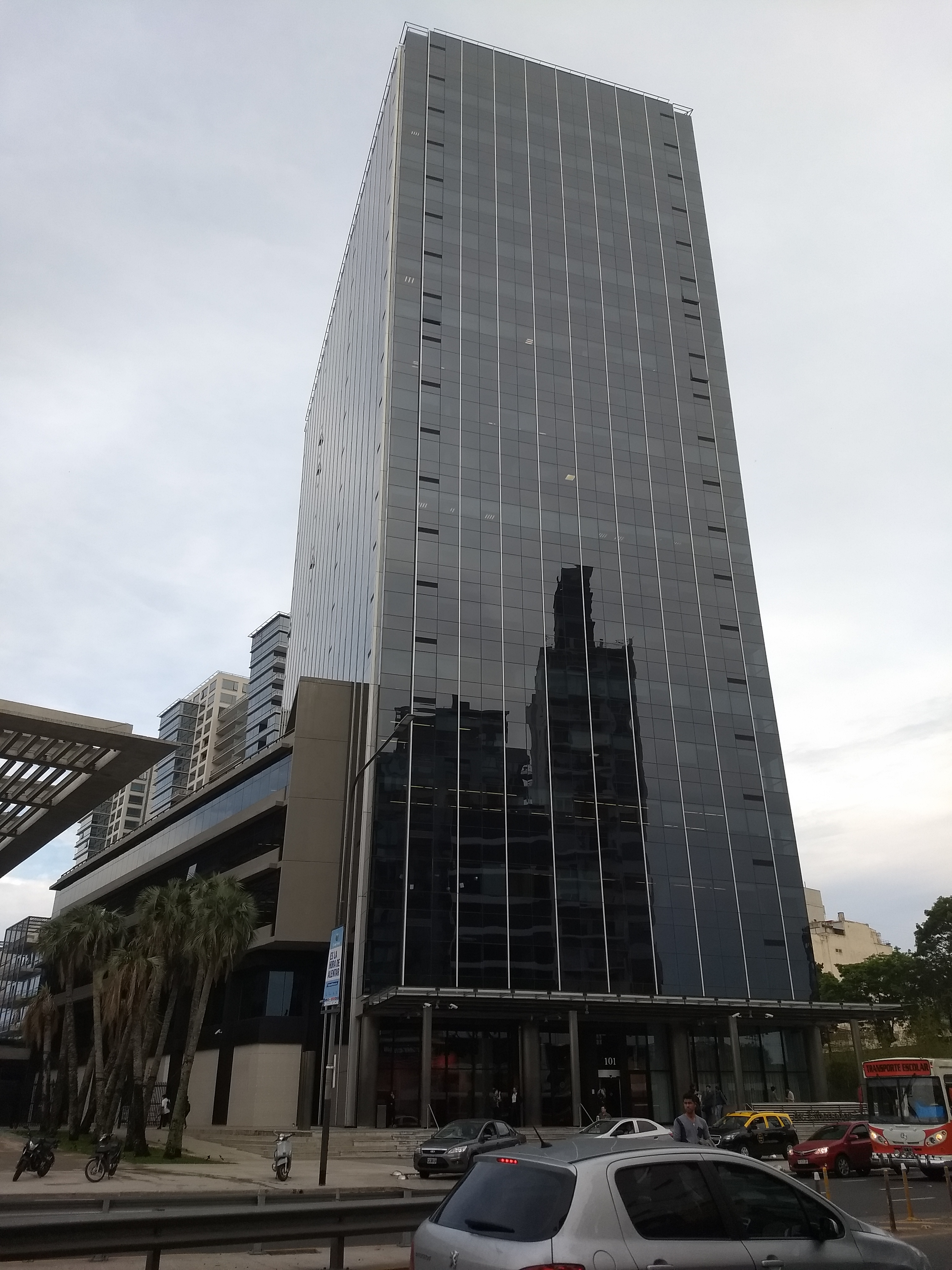
Headquarters from 2015, located in Vicente López, Buenos Aires Province

== Editorial stance ==
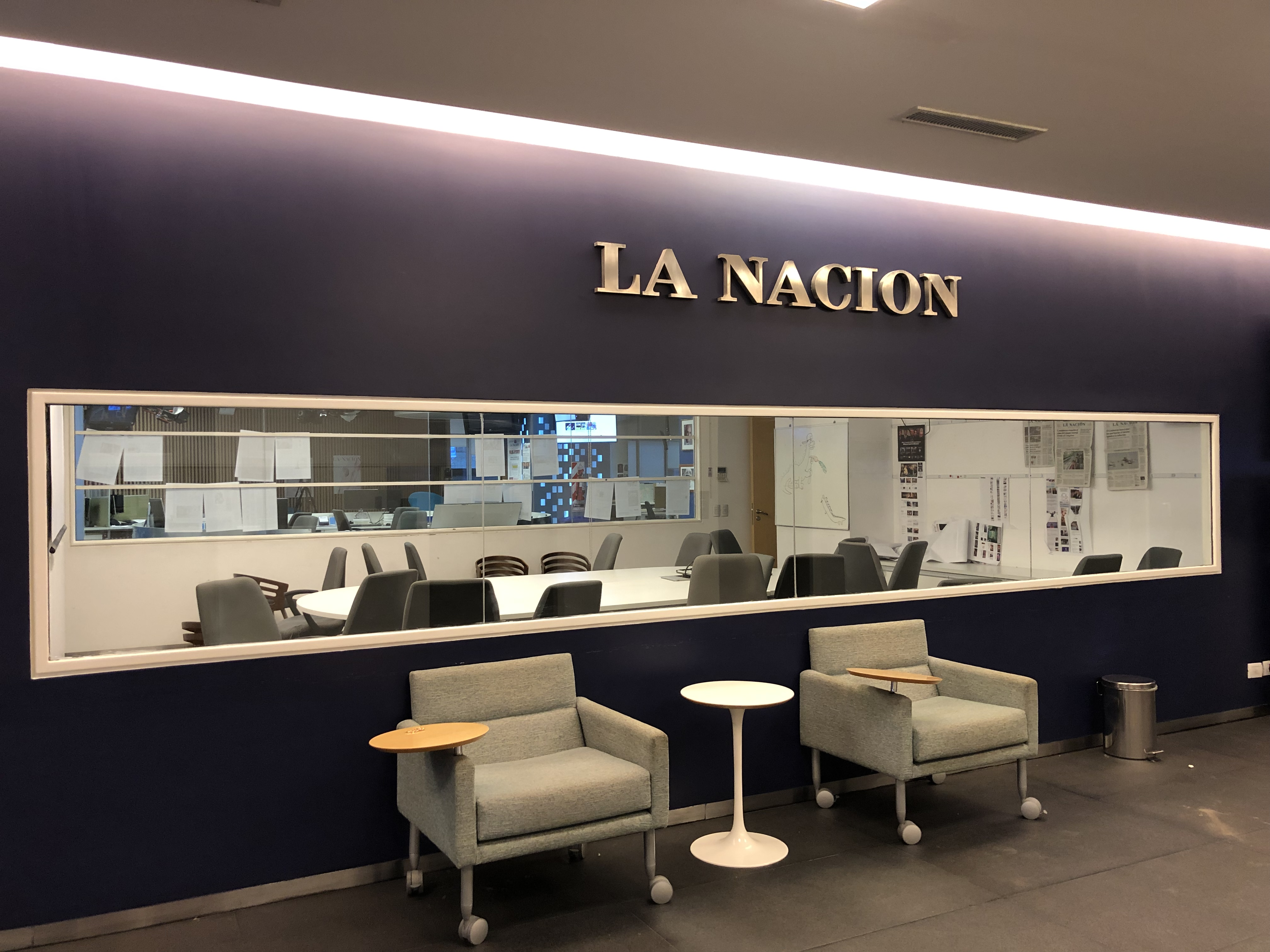
Headquarters in Olivos, Buenos Aires Province

In its origins, La Nación was born as a partisan newspaper, to sustain the action of Bartolomé Mitre, former President of Argentina. It was one of the most influential in the country's political life until the first half of the century. Mitre had just closed the Argentine Nation and decided to replace it with this other newspaper that he conceived as a platform of doctrine. It would be destined to propagate the liberal ideology that he dreamed of for the country. Self-proclaimed a "platform of doctrine" of liberalism, he is considered the official spokesman of the oligarchy.

Mitre inspired an editorial policy opposed to discrimination and openly in favor of full equality between Argentines and foreigners.

In the 19th century, La Nación underwent four closures. The final closure suffered was ordered by Julio Argentino Roca, amidst the debates on the unification of the public debt.

During the two world wars, La Nación's editorial stance was clearly oriented in favour of the allied cause, and critical, in both cases, of the neutrality policy of the Argentine government. Georges Clemenceau, David Lloyd George, Woodrow Wilson, Winston Churchill, Franklin D. Roosevelt, and Charles De Gaulle were constantly portrayed on the pages as heroes of the cause for freedom.

Jorge Adolfo Mitre, director of the newspaper for twenty years with a liberal profile, urged the newspaper to follow the laws of common, free and compulsory education, secularization of cemeteries and civil marriage.

Hipólito Yrigoyen, twice president for the Radical Civic Union, was tried with manifest severity in his governments. La Nación found reasons to win sympathy with the government of Marcelo Torcuato de Alvear.

In 1920 the direction of the literary supplement that he had decided to include in the Sunday editions was left in the hands of Arturo Cancela, a nationalist catholic. For this, the newspaper featured articles authored by Benito Mussolini. So did Leon Trotsky, as he fled the world when the Stalinists who were chasing him.

The newspaper supported the 1930 coup d'état led by José Félix Uriburu, though it later condemned the electoral fraud that dominated the country between 1931 and 1943, during the so-called "Infamous Decade".

According to members of the newspaper's board of directors, La Nación had two pillars since its foundation in 1870: being an expression of the national culture and a support for the Argentine countryside.

It has been the Argentine newspaper that is most involved with the development of the agriculture, the most efficient sector of the national economy.

Victoria Ocampo, Adolfo Bioy Casares and Ernesto Sabato found in a journal of liberal and also conservative ideas, the appropriate environment to express their thoughts. Mario Vargas Llosa, historic contributor, said:

The role of the newspaper a Nación in Argentina has been and is very rich. Fundamental to the culture of the country, a field in which it has performed an unimaginable work.

According to Julio Maria Sanguinetti, a daily collaborator of La Nacion, "it has been a space for coexistence and a forum of ideas for conservative liberals, progressive liberals, social democrats, Christian democrats or even open-minded nationalists, that there is all of this in our political life, distributed in diverse parties or expression of individualities." Always conservative in tendency, La Nación accompanied the resistance of the ruling classes to the changes that reality imposed. The newspaper continues to call the two periods of Perón's constitutional government "dictatorship" and does not use the same term to name the military governments installed after the successive coups d'état. José Claudio Escribano, historical Deputy Director of the newspaper and member of its Editorial Board, declared that he is simultaneously liberal and conservative:

La Nación is simultaneously a liberal and conservative newspaper... and we feel good in that place. We are conservative regarding the defense of values that are highly representative of Argentine society. The defense of freedom, the defense of a minimum order without which an organized society is not possible, the defense of the republican institutions that the constituents of 1853-60 gave us. And we are liberals in the broadest sense of the word. We are not liberal economists, but as long as we are in favor of the possibility that in all areas of knowledge the reader has a plural informative offer.

=== Historic contributors ===
Some of the most famous writers in Latin America have appeared regularly in its columns.

- José Martí
- Miguel de Unamuno
- Alberto Gerchunoff
- Eduardo Mallea
- José Ortega y Gasset
- Jorge Luis Borges
- Rubén Darío
- Alfonso Reyes
- Manuel Mujica Láinez
- Alberto Lleras Camargo
- Mario Vargas Llosa

=== Notable columnists ===
Today, it has prominent columnists and journalists.

- Joaquín Morales Solá
- Carlos Pagni
- Jorge Fernández Díaz
- Mariano Grondona
- Hugo Alconada Mon
- Juan Carlos de Pablo
- Nora Bär
- Facundo Manes
- Diego Sehinkman
- Iván de Pineda
- Isha Escribano
- Pablo Sirvén
- Carlos Reymundo Roberts
- Fernando Laborda
- Héctor Guyot
- Claudio Jacquelin
- Martín Rodríguez Yebra
- Ariel Torres

== Property ==
Published accounts have examined the corporate structure of the La Nación Group and the involvement of offshore shell companies. One account describes Barton Corp as an offshore shell company associated with La Nación and states that the newspaper's corporate structure involved multiple shell companies established in tax havens whose shareholders were unknown.
