= Clarín Group =

Argentine media conglomerate

Coordinates: 34°37′44″S 58°22′36″W

Grupo Clarín S.A.
- Type: Public
- Traded as: BCBA: GCLA; LSE: GCLA
- Industry: Mass media
- Founded: 1 December 1999; 26 years ago
- Headquarters: Buenos Aires, Argentina
- Area served: Worldwide
- Key people: Héctor Magnetto (CEO); Jorge Rendo (chairman); José Antonio Aranda (vice chairman)
- Products: Newspapers; Newsprint; Cable television Radio broadcasting Internet service
- Brands: List: Clarín; Carburando; Olé; Radio Mitre; TN; El Trece (Internacional); TyC Sports
- Revenue: ▲US$ 2.2 billion (2011)
- Net income: ▲US$ 278 million (2011)
- Total assets: ▲US$ 2.4 billion (2011)
- Number of employees: 7,000
- Subsidiaries: Papel Prensa; Pol-ka; Telecom Argentina
- Website: grupoclarin.com

Grupo Clarín S.A. is an Argentine media conglomerate headquartered in Buenos Aires.

== Overview ==
Established as such in 1999, it includes the Clarín newspaper (the most-widely circulated in Latin America), Papel Prensa (the nation's principal newsprint manufacturer), Cablevisión cable television, the Artear media company, and numerous other media outlets.

Rooted in the successful 1945 launch of the centrist daily, Clarín, by the late Roberto Noble, the group is active within the publishing, newspaper, television, radio, and telecommunications industries. Its largest shareholder was Ernestina Herrera de Noble. Other major shareholders include Héctor Magnetto, José Antonio Aranda, Lucio Rafael Pagliaro, and the investment bank Goldman Sachs. Magnetto is the president and CEO of the media group, while Ernestina Herrera de Noble directs the flagship Clarín newspaper.

Having become the largest newspaper distributor in the Spanish-speaking world by 1980 (when its revenues topped US$900 million), the group diversified itself significantly in 1990, when it entered into the television sector with the acquisition of Channel 13, and into radio with the purchase of Radio Mitre. Following the expansion into cable television in 1992 (Multicanal), Todo Noticias, the group's cable news channel, was established in 1993 and remains one of the most influential in its sector. The conglomerate also controls Patagonik Film Group and numerous regional newspapers (notably Los Andes of Mendoza and La Voz del Interior of Córdoba).

Grupo Clarín was listed on the Buenos Aires and London Stock Exchanges in 2007, upon which a 20% share in the group was made available to stockholders (leaving 9% for Goldman Sachs, and 71% for its private shareholders). The group's revenues in 2011 were accounted for mainly by its cable television units (principally Cablevisión and Multicanal), which accounted for 46% of sales, and by advertising revenues (22%). Internet service provider Prima S.A. yielded 14% of total revenues, and the Group's numerous publishing interests netted 9% of the total; and rights to broadcasting, programming and digital content accounted for most of the remainder.

Goldman Sachs sold its 9% share in the group to Fontinalis Partners equity fund CEO Ralph Booth in 2012. Amid ongoing controversies between Clarín and Kirchnerism over a 2009 antitrust law that would limit the number of radio and television licenses held by the Clarín Group, the Federal Authority for Audiovisual Communication Services (AFSCA) enjoined the group on 17 December 2012, to divest itself of its majority stake in Cablevisión and of up to 213 broadcast licenses that would exceed the number stipulated by law; the 2009 Audiovisual Services Law allows companies to have 24 cable licenses and 10 free-to-air licenses for radio and television, and to cover no more than 35% of the pay-per-view population.

== Debt default and political influence ==
One of Grupo Clarín's holdings is the cable company Multicanal S.A. In the early 2000s, Multicanal defaulted on payments to holders of its Notes. According to U.S. Bankruptcy Court records, Grupo Clarín made political moves that ultimately ended up hindering the ability of the Note holders from getting paid back.

In 2002, Argentina was in a financial and economic crisis. Argentina's peso was tied to the value of the U.S. dollar, but in 2002 the government let the value of the peso float. As a result, the value of the peso went down 75% relative to the value of the U.S. dollar in just four months.

Multicanal bought programming from the United States. The peso devaluation, along with the country's restrictions on access to U.S. dollars, made it expensive for Multicanal to purchase that programming. Multicanal also struggled to make interest payments on its approximately US$509 million in debt. By April 2002, Multicanal defaulted on all of its payments to the holders of its Notes. When Multicanal went into bankruptcy proceedings in the United States, a group of investors and holders of Multicanal's Notes (a group referred to as "Huff"), filed a petition in U.S. Bankruptcy Court. Huff had filed cases in New York State Courts to try and get Multicanal to pay back those Notes, Multicanal had filed what is known as a § 304 petition because Multicanal did not want to have to pay Huff for its overdue payments on Notes.

A new 2003 Argentina law, which Grupo Clarín had successfully lobbied to pass, made it difficult for Huff and the holders of the Notes. The law limited how much stock in a communications company could be owned by people outside of Argentina. Huff later complained that the law gave Clarin and Multicanal an unfair advantage.

== Companies and brands ==
Some of the companies that form part of the conglomerate are:

Company / brand	Product / service
Clarín	Newspaper
Carburando	Media dedicated to auto racing
Olé	Sports newspaper
Papel Prensa	Newsprint manufacturer
Radio Mitre	Radio broadcasting
Telecom Argentina (33%) (Note: Grupo Clarín's company Cablevisión and Telecom merged in 2017, with "Cablevisión Holding" (a spin-off from the conglomerate) owning the 33% of the recently formed company.)	Cable television, internet access, mobile telephony
TN	News television channel
El Trece	Television channel
TyC Sports	Sports channel
