= Mass media in Argentina =

The mass media in Argentina is one of the leading media markets in South America, with a relatively free and fair press and media industry. While there are 15 major media companies in Argentina, most media outlets are owned by a very small number of large conglomerates such as Grupo Clarín and Grupo América.

== Major media companies ==
The major media companies in Argentina are:

- Grupo América
- América Móvil
- ARSAT
- Grupo Clarín
- Grupo Pierri (Telecentro)
- Infobae (owned by Daniel Hadad)
- La Nación
- Papel Prensa
- Grupo PRISA
- Telefe (the company owned by Paramount Global)

== Facts and figures ==
According to a 2018 joint study between the University of Oxford and Reuters, “Argentina is characterised by a strong and concentrated private media system, comparatively weaker public media organisations, and high online connectivity compared to other Latin American countries.”

The same study reported that many Argentine citizens distrust both politics and the media.

Argentina has over 150 daily newspapers. Over 100 commercial radio stations exist throughout the country. One estimate places the number of Argentinian internet users at 16 million. Placing this on context: the population of Argentina is 44 million.

The main newspapers in Argentina are:

- Clarín
- Crónica
- Diario Popular
- El Cronista
- La Nación
- La Prensa
- Página/12
- Perfil (only weekdays)

== Media conglomerates ==
Reporters Without Borders and an organization representing Argentine media workers got together and formed a project known as the Media Ownership Monitor (MOM). MOM “investigated the most influential media in Argentina (TV, radio, print and online), with the aim to highlight who the media owners and their political and economic interests are.” The MOM report found that Grupo Clarín is the only media conglomerate that has extensive market power in all areas of the media and telecommunications industries.

=== Grupo Clarín ===
The largest media company in Argentina is Grupo Clarín. The company owns Clarín, a newspaper with the largest circulation in Argentina that prints over 1,000,000 copies of its Sunday edition. Canal 13 is the second most popular TV station in Buenos Aires and Grupo Clarín owns it, too, among many other media assets.

The four largest media conglomerates in Argentina cover almost half of the national audience. One of the mega media companies, Grupo Clarín, covers 25% of the national audience.

Clarín owns three of the ten largest newspapers: Clarín, La Voz del Interior (from Córdoba), and Los Andes. These three papers represented nearly half the national newspaper reading audience in 2018.

After Grupo Clarín came into the audiovisual media market in 1989, it became the biggest media group in Argentina. Clarín owns over half of the pay-TV market and has significant power in controlling news, paper, film, and TV production companies. Telefónica is another major player in Argentine media. Telefónica owns commercial broadcast TV stations as well as landline-based and cell phone companies. (It does not, however, own any print media). Finally, Grupo Vila-Manzano is another large and significant power in Argentina's media landscape. The company began within the Mendoza province and expanded to the rest of the nation, although it does not have much market penetration in Buenos Aires. Vila-Manzano owns pay-TV, local newspaper in provincial (state) capitals, radio stations, and TV stations.

=== Grupo América ===
In Argentina, the largest media companies don't make most of their money from media services. Instead, they make the majority of their revenue from other businesses and industries. For example, Grupo América is a media company owned by two businessmen, Daniel Vila and José Luis Manzano. It owns large firms in energy, oil, and public service supplies. One of the company's partners owns Swiss Medical Group, the largest private healthcare company in Argentina.

Grupo América (formerly, Grupo UNO) is focused on free TV and radio ever since it sold its cable TV company Supercanal in 2018.

The company has 28 licenses between AM, FM and open television broadcasting. Manzano and Vila control to broadcast channel América TV and its cable TV channel América 24, La Red radio and newspaper networks including La Capital del Rosario and Diario UNO in Entre Rios, Mendoza and Santa Fe. With its extensive network of media services, the company reaches about 25 million people in Argentina and thus constitutes the second largest multimedia group in the country.

=== Grupo Indalo ===
Grupo Indalo holds interests in radio, TV and print. However, at the time of the MOM study, the company's owners were in prison related to a judicial investigation.

Foreign investment companies, such as Viacom, Turner and Fox, mostly run the most popular TV stations.

=== Others ===
Telefe (owned by ViacomCBS), Grupo La Nación and Grupo Perfil are smaller media groups. Unlike the big conglomerates, they earn most of their income from content production and publishing.

== History ==
Prior to and during President Juan Perón’s final period of rule (1973-1974), and that of his widow Isabel Perón (1974-1976), and the direct military rule that would follow, journalism was censored and the regime suppressed release of information about the disappearance of over 11,000 Argentinians during his time in office. However, since the country’s return to a democratic government in 1983, the country became home to “one of South America’s leading media markets.”

When the Perón regime first began, the country's oldest newspaper La Prensa butted heads with the regime, battling it out on its daily pages. Eventually, Perón took it over by force.

When the country's government was restored to democracy, “harassment of the media stopped.”

President Mauricio Macri, in office from 2015 to 2019, upon entering his office, created a set of new rules to regulate the country's media. His decrees also created a new government agency to implement his new rules. According to Human Rights Watch, the new agency reported to the executive branch, thus “compromising its ability to act independently from government interests.”

As of 2019, large media groups have experienced a growth in profits and earnings. However, Argentina is in an economic crisis. Media salaries dropped by 30 percent or more. Over 20 media outlets have closed since 2016. Over 3,500 employees lost their jobs over a recent two-year period.

== Internet service and industry ==
In 2018, 90 percent of Internet users in Argentina got their news information from the Internet each week—a higher number than those who got it from TV or print newspapers and magazines.

When Grupo Clarín (the largest media company in the country) merged with Telecom, over half of Argentinians using the Internet got their service from the new merged company. The merger also created the first ever company in Argentina to be allowed to offer what is known as “quadruple play”: landline, mobile, cable, and Internet services to consumers. All other companies wishing to offer quadruple play were required to wait until January 2019.

== Government deregulation and funding gives rise to media consolidation ==
According to RSF, national deregulation of the industry gave way to the conglomerates becoming more powerful among the media landscape. Mauricio Macri became president in 2015. In his first month in office, he changed the rules about media concentration. It allowed media companies to be bigger and larger and more powerful.

The national government gives money to media companies. It gives money for advertising, financial help, loan forgiveness, debt redemption, and license extensions. This type of leverage creates a dependent relationship between the media and the government.

Because of President Macri's changes to the regulatory landscape, Clarín expanded its business into the telecommunications industry. Clarín's cable division (called Cablevisión) merged with a big company called Telecom. It became "the largest media conglomerate in the history of communications in Argentina."

== Legal trends ==
In 2009, there were two events that are considered significant factors to the modern transformation of the country's media system. One was passage of the Audiovisual Communication Services Law (Ley de Servicios de Comunicación Audiovisual) (also known as the “SCA Law”). The other was the country's adoption of TDT, a digital standard for “terrestrial digital TV.”

The new SCA Law replaced the older law, which was “inherited from the last military dictatorship (1976–1983), which in turn had been amended over a period of 20 years.” The SCA Law made a number of changes. It created regulations for the digitization process within the media industry; reserved portions of the spectrum for non-profit groups; required private media companies to abide by certain “public service obligations”; gave licenses to native Argentinian communities; improved access to media for the hearing and visual impaired; created a new regulatory body (independent of the executive branch); made telecommunications license holders provide a certain degree of transparency; and banned phone companies from having media licenses. Many large Argentine media groups strongly opposed the SCA Law, and there was even a flood of litigation after its passage and implementation. Opposition political parties even refused to cooperate once it was passed.

== See also ==
- Communications in Argentina
- List of newspapers in Argentina
- Radio in Argentina
- Television in Argentina
