= List of newspapers in Argentina =

The list of newspapers in Argentina records printed and online newspapers from Argentina.

The circulation of newspapers in Argentina peaked in 1983, with a sale of 1,420,417 copies overall. Two decades later it declined to 1,109,441 copies, and to 1,038,955 copies in 2012. Clarín remains the largest newspaper in Argentina, despite the fall in both total circulation and market share, which peaked at almost 500,000 copies and 35% of the Argentine newspaper market in 1983, respectively.

== List ==
Key

Partially or wholly published in a foreign language

Newspaper	Headquarters	Founded	Language	Category
Ámbito Financiero	Buenos Aires	1976	Spanish	Printed
Argentinisches Tageblatt	Buenos Aires	1878–2023	German	Printed
Buenos Aires Herald	Buenos Aires	1876–2017, relaunched 2023	English	Online
Buenos Aires Times	Buenos Aires	2017	English	Online/Printed
Clarín	Buenos Aires	1945	Spanish	Printed
Crónica	Buenos Aires	1963	Spanish	Printed
Deutsche La Plata Zeitung	Buenos Aires	1874–1945	German	Printed
Diario de Cuyo	San Juan	1947	Spanish	Printed
Diario Democracia	Junín	1931	Spanish	Printed
Diario El Chubut	Trelew	1975	Spanish	Printed
Diario Norte	Resistencia	1968	Spanish	Printed
Diario Popular	Sarandí	1974	Spanish	Printed
Diario Río Negro	General Roca	1912	Spanish	Printed
Diario Sirio-Libanés	Buenos Aires	1929	Arabic, Spanish	Printed (formerly)/ Online
Diario de Argentina	Buenos Aires	2019	Spanish	Printed
El Ancasti	San Fernando del Valle de Catamarca	1988	Spanish	Printed
El Cordillerano	Bariloche	1994	Spanish	Printed
El Cronista	Buenos Aires	1908	Spanish	Printed
El Día	La Plata	1884	Spanish	Printed
El Diario	Paraná	1914	Spanish	Printed
El Diario de la República	San Luis	1966	Spanish	Printed
El Diario del Fin del Mundo	Ushuaia	1994	Spanish	Printed
El Economista	Buenos Aires	1951	Spanish	Printed/Online
El Independiente	La Rioja	1959	Spanish	Printed
El Liberal	Santiago del Estero	1898	Spanish	Printed
El Litoral	Santa Fe	1918	Spanish	Printed
El Patagónico	Comodoro Rivadavia	1967	Spanish	Printed
El Siglo	San Miguel de Tucumán	1990	Spanish	Printed
El Tribuno	Salta	1949	Spanish	Printed
El Tribuno de Jujuy	San Salvador de Jujuy	1980	Spanish	Printed
El Zonda	San Juan	1839	Spanish	Printed
Infobae	Buenos Aires	2002	Spanish	Online
La Capital	Rosario	1867	Spanish	Printed
La Gaceta	San Miguel de Tucumán	1912	Spanish	Printed
La Opinión Austral	Río Gallegos	1959	Spanish	Printed
La Nación	Buenos Aires	1870	Spanish	Printed
La Nueva Provincia	Bahía Blanca	1898	Spanish	Printed
La Patria degli italiani	Buenos Aires	1877–1931	Italian	Printed
La Prensa	Buenos Aires	1869	Spanish	Printed
La Razón	Buenos Aires	1905–2017	Spanish	Printed
La Vanguardia	Buenos Aires	1894	Spanish	Printed
La Voz del Interior	Córdoba	1904	Spanish	Printed
L'Italiano	Buenos Aires	2010	Italian	Printed
Los Andes	Mendoza	1883	Spanish	Printed
MDZ Online	Guaymallén	2007	Spanish	Online
Misiones Online	Posadas	2000	Spanish	Printed
Nueva Rioja	La Rioja	2003	Spanish	Printed
Nuevo Diario	Santiago del Estero	1991	Spanish	Printed
Olé	Buenos Aires	1996	Spanish	Printed
Página/12	Buenos Aires	1987	Spanish	Printed
Perfil	Buenos Aires	1998	Spanish	Printed
Prensa Obrera	Buenos Aires	1982	Spanish	Printed
Río Negro	General Roca	1912	Spanish	Printed
The Southern Cross	Buenos Aires	1875	Irish, Spanish	Printed
Tiempo Argentino	Buenos Aires	1982–1986	Spanish	Printed

== See also ==
- Communications in Argentina
- List of magazines in Argentina
- Mass media in Argentina
- Radio in Argentina
- Television in Argentina
