= Dan Newland =

American freelance journalist (born 1949)

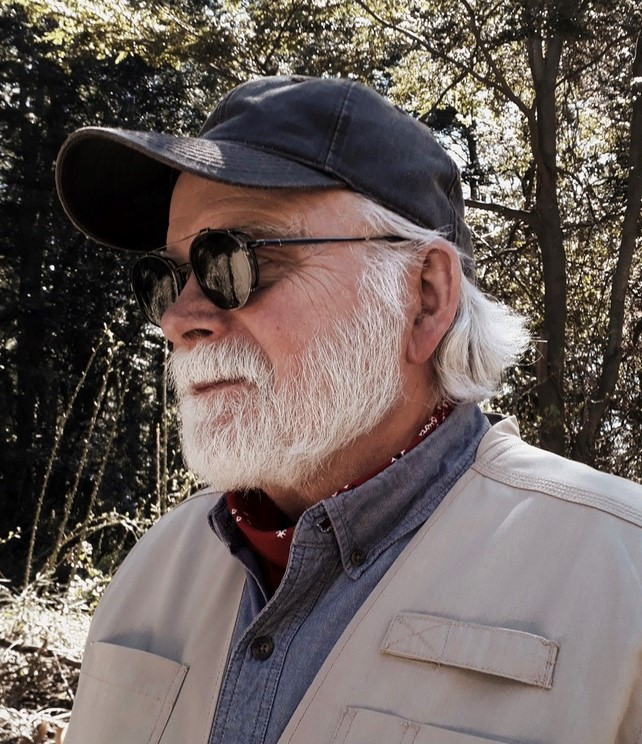
Dan Newland

Danny Norman Newland (born December 9, 1949, in Wapakoneta, Ohio), also known as Dan Newland, is an American freelance journalist, blogger, translator, editor, writer and ghostwriter. He is a former managing editor of the Buenos Aires Herald.

== Biography ==
Danny Norman Newland was born in 1949 in Wapakoneta, Ohio to Norman Dale Newland (1922–2003) and Reba Mae Weber Newland (1923–2003). He is the brother of two siblings, Darla Newland Ginter (1947- ) and Dennis Newland (1953-2005). Newland met Argentine exchange student Virginia Estela Mel at his high school in Wapakoneta in 1968 and married her in Los Angeles, California in 1971, while he was in the Army stationed at Fort MacArthur. They moved to Argentina shortly after Newland was honorably discharged from military service following three years as a musician in the US Army Bands in the United States and Europe.

He joined the staff of the Buenos Aires Herald in 1974 and worked for the English-language daily for the next thirteen years, serving as reporter, sub-editor, international editor, general news editor, columnist, editorial-writer and managing editor. The newspaper was renowned for denouncing atrocities in Argentina's Dirty War (mid to late 1970s) during the period in which Newland formed part of the staff. As interim editor in 1982 during the Falklands War, he was responsible for independent news coverage of the conflict. Throughout the era of the military dictatorship (1976-1983) Herald writers and editors suffered death threats from the regime forcing news editor Andrew Graham-Yooll in 1976 and editor in chief Robert Cox in 1979 to leave the country. Following these departures, the threats continued against Cox's replacement, James Neilson and against Newland as the newspaper's main editorial writers.

After the terrorist attack on the French satirical magazine Charlie Hebdo in 2015, Newland wrote: "From mid-1974 through early 1983, I lived in a climate in which I became accustomed to existing, first, with the threat of death by proxy involved in being part of the support team for courageous editorialists, and, later, with direct threats to my own life and to the newspaper that I worked for, as I devoted my own efforts to expressing the paper’s political and moral line. Asked, on occasion, why I did it, when it wasn’t my country or my fight, I’ve always replied that, on the contrary, opposing tyranny and violent fundamentalism of any kind is everyone’s fight no matter where it happens, and that for writers, journalists and political humorists, it’s not a choice, but a moral and professional obligation."

Newland has also worked out of South America as a freelance stringer for a wide range of publications and news organizations in the United States and Britain and as a special projects editor for the Buenos Aires business magazine Apertura.

He writes a twice-monthly blog entitled The Southern Yankee: A Writer's Log. He is the author of four books, editor, ghostwriter and freelance translator. He is a founding member of the International Association of Professional Translators and Interpreters IAPTI.

== Selected works ==
Books

- The Rock Garden and Other Stories (2021)
- Visions of What Used To Be (2022)
- From a Place Called Wapakoneta (2024)
- Other Worlds - Destinations on the Road of Life (2025)
- Whitey's War - Collateral Damage (2026)

Translations

Among others:

- Argentina, A Nation at the Crossroads of Myth and Reality, by Ricardo Zinn (1979).
- Patagonia: Land of Giants, by Daniel Rivademar and Alejandro Winograd (2004).
- Sustainability 2.0, by Ernesto van Peborgh and the Odiseo Team (2008).
- No Reserve: The Limit of Absolute Power, by Martín Redrado (2010).
- Short History of World Religions, by Roberto Vivo (2012).
- War: A Crime Against Humanity, by Roberto Vivo (2014).
