= Lalín (surname) =

Lalín is a toponymic surname of Galician origin, derived from the municipality of Lalín.

Notable people with the surname include:

- Allan Lalín (born 1981), Honduran footballer
- Daniel Lalín, Argentine businessman
- Matilde Lalín, Argentine-Canadian mathematician
- Wilson Lalín (born 1985), Guatemalan footballer

== See also ==
- Lars Lalin (1729–1785), Swedish musician, playwright and opera singer
- Lalin (disambiguation)
