= Blanquiceleste =

Argentine private company

Blanquiceleste S.A.
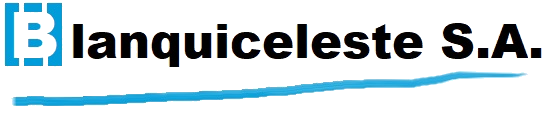
- Logo used from 2000 to 2008

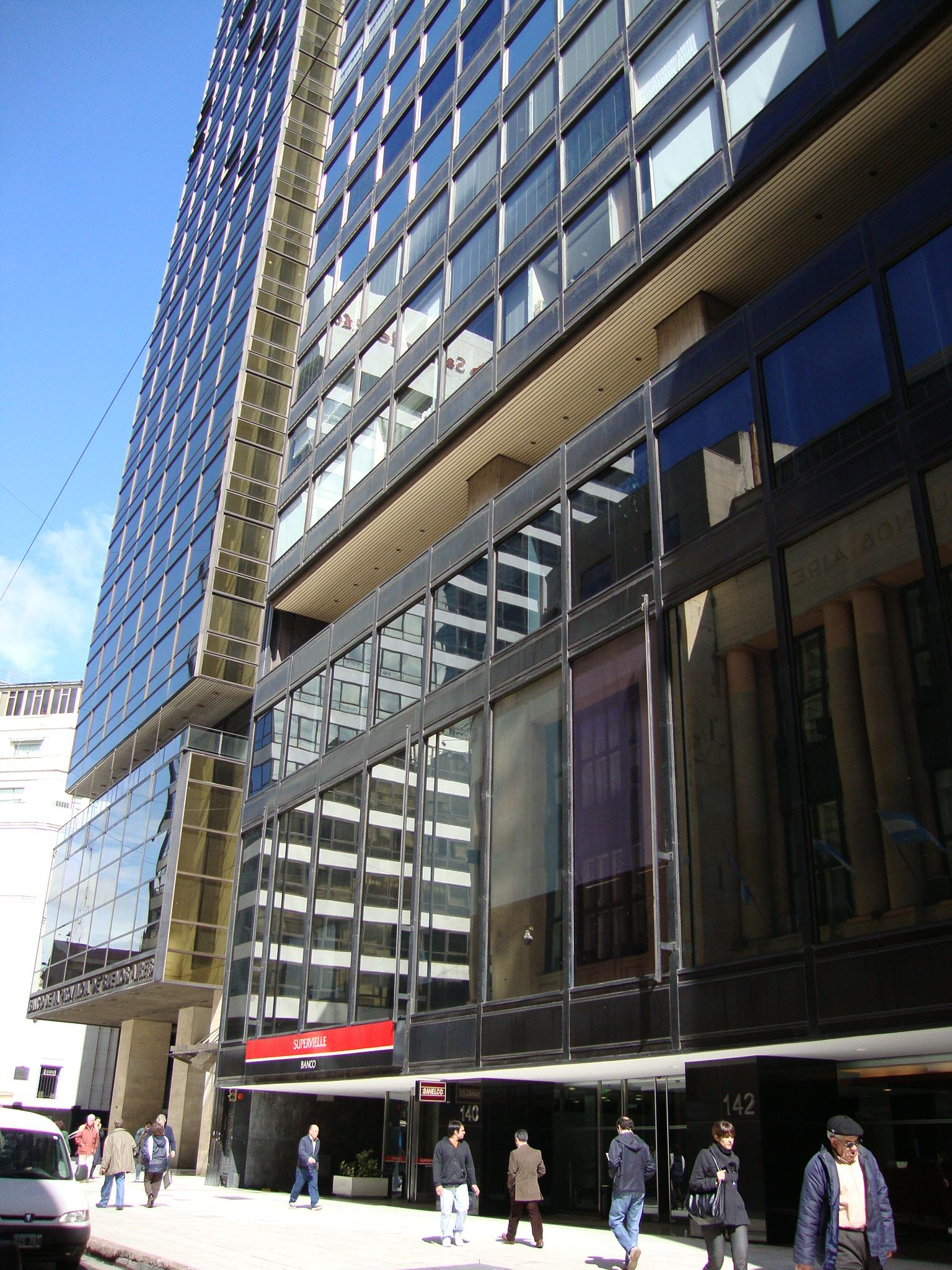
- Blanquiceleste's headquarters in Buenos Aires, Argentina
- Native name: Blanquiceleste Sociedad Anónima
- Company type: Private
- Industry: Association football
- Founded: December 29, 2000 in Buenos Aires, Argentina
- Founder: Fernando Marín
- Defunct: July 7, 2008
- Key people: Fernando Marín; Fernando De Tomasso
- Owner: Mohammed Hussein Al Amoudi (49%)
- Members: 250 (2002)

Blanquiceleste S.A. was an Argentine company that managed Racing Club’s football team, stadium and merchandising during the club’s bankruptcy proceedings, from 2000 to 2008.

== History ==
In 1999, following a bankruptcy request filed by former president Daniel Lalín, Racing Club came under the control of a court-appointed trustee led by Judge Enrique Gorostegui. This was the result of pressure from club members and the implementation of Argentina’s Trust Law.

In 2000, businessman Fernando Marín submitted a management plan aimed at repaying the club’s debt over a ten-year period. On December 29, the plan was approved, officially launching the tenure of Blanquiceleste. In 2001, Racing avoided relegation playoffs with key wins over Colón and Independiente and went on to win the Argentine league title for the first time in 35 years, under coach Reinaldo Merlo.

In 2006, after mounting criticism due to poor results, Fernando De Tomaso replaced Marín as head of Blanquiceleste. That same year, Racing controversially leased its stadium to archrival Independiente while their own ground was being renovated. Between 2007 and 2008, fan protests intensified amid allegations of unpaid salaries, bounced checks, and mounting debts. Reinaldo Merlo, who had returned as manager, publicly accused the management company of breach of contract and internal sabotage.

Growing pressure from supporters and worsening financial conditions hastened the end of the deal, originally set to expire in 2008. Judicial administrator Héctor García Cuerva requested immediate termination of the contract. On July 7, 2008, the agreement with Blanquiceleste S.A. was formally terminated, and the company was declared bankrupt that same day. In December, club elections were reinstated, and Rodolfo Molina was elected president with 44% of the vote.
