= Daniel Lalín =

- Occupations: Businessman, accountant, property-owner

Héctor Daniel Lalín (born 10 August 1948) is an Argentine businessman and accountant with close ties to the ruling Kirchner family. He was the president of Racing Club, a professional sports club based in the Avellaneda district of Buenos Aires, from 1995 to 1999, and is a major figure in the Argentine oil business.

== Early life and education ==
Born in 1948, Lalín was a member of Montonero, the youth wing of the Peronist left. In 1999, as head of Racing, he described himself as still being “ideologically” a member of Montonero, despite all his wealth and success.

== Career ==
In the mid 1970s, Lalín was Dean of the Faculty of Economics at the National University of Lomas de Zamora. He later served as treasurer of the city of Buenos Aires during the administration of Carlos Grosso (1989–92). During his term as city treasurer, Lalín and his old friend Daniel Peralta, who at the time was the director of Argentina's central bank and a close friend of Argentinian president Néstor Kirchner, won oil exploration leases from the Kirchner government, despite not having any experience in that field required under Argentine law.

Prior to his election as president of Racing Club, Lalín also pursued a “successful career in real estate and construction.”

=== Racing Club ===
Lalín was president of Racing Club, also known as Racing Club de Avellaneda or simply as Racing, from 1995 to 1999. The club was the favorite of President Néstor Kirchner. During his years at Racing Club, according to one source, Lalín became part of a social circle that included “Menemistas” Daniel Vila and José Luis Manzano and “‘K’ front men” Cristóbal López and Lázaro Báez.

During Lalín's tenure, Racing Club experienced a financial crisis. Some sources described him as the latest in a series of incompetent and/or corrupt presidents of Racing Club, suggesting that his purchase of several expensive top-level players precipitated the crisis. According to Newsweek, the major factor in Racing Club's financial decline was the fact that it had, under Lalín, “stopped developing young talent in favor of recruiting high-priced stars – often using peculiar financing.” Newsweek noted that Lalín himself was Racing's biggest creditor, having “pumped $2.5 million of his own money into Racing to keep it afloat, sometimes in exchange for rights to players.”

In 1998, Lalín, a priest, and some 500 fans took part in an elaborate “exorcism” ceremony with the intention of banishing evil spirits from Racing Club. “We are uniting Roman Catholicism with Racingism,” Lalín explained. “It is an act of faith. The same faith displayed by the fans who stoically go to the stadium every Sunday.”

Lalín filed for bankruptcy on behalf of Racing Club on July 10, 1998. When he announced the bankruptcy, fans reacted with outrage. Some hurled stones at him, and one person threw a drum at him, causing an injury to his nose. More than 1500 fans “called for his head.” He defended the bankruptcy, calling it “the best way out.” On July 13, 1998, Judge Enrique Gorostegui officially declared Racing bankrupt. On March 4, 1999, the Court of Appeals of La Plata ordered the immediate liquidation of all of Racing's assets. Racing, it was announced, had “ceased to exist.” On May 5, 1999, Lalín and his executive committee submitted their resignations. At the time Lalín left the club, it had $62 million in debts, 200 judgments against it, and 3 million pesos in liens. After the club went bankrupt, it was bailed out by the Kirchner government.

On October 6, 1999, prosecutor Manuel Barreiro issued arrest warrants for Lalín and former Racing presidents Osvaldo Otero and Juan De Stéfano in connection with charges of mismanagement. Lalín was taken into custody, and he and De Stéfano spent 14 days in detention in a police station in Lanús. The charges against him were dropped and he was released. In November 2000, De Stéfano claimed on a Fox Sports program that during the time he and Lalín had been in jail together, Lalín had told him that the dismissal of charges against him, Lalín, had “cost him 200 thousand dollars.” De Stéfano described Lalín's acquittal as an example of the importance of political favors in “the city of Buenos Aires, the palace of corruption.” Otero said of Lalín that high-level “radical leaders” were “doing everything possible to save him.” De Stéfano blamed both Lalín and Otero for the bankruptcy of Racing Club, which he called “a scam, a lie, immoral, and a disgrace.” De Stéfano claimed that “the club is run by scoundrels,” and urged the judge in the case to conduct a serious investigation that would drive “the Mafia” out of Racing management.

Lalín himself also declared personal bankruptcy in 1998 following a request by former Racing coach Carlos Babington, to whom he owed $600,000. They had worked out a payment deal but Lalín had reneged on it. Critics claimed that he owed $8 million and accused him of fraudulent management. It was noted that he actually had “nothing to his name” and held all his assets through companies. “Fiscally he doesn’t exist,” an attorney stated.

=== After Racing Club ===
After leaving Racing Club, Lalín entered the oil business and became very successful in a short period.

A 2001 U.S. Senate report stated that Lalín had engaged in player transactions through Mercado Abierto SA and MA – House Exchange, both subsidiaries of the Cayman Islands-based Grupo Mercado Abierto, which was owned by three Lalín associates, Miguel Iribarne, Aldo Ducler, and Hector Scasserra. The Senate report linked Group Mercado Abierto to the Juarez drug cartel and identified it as a vehicle for laundering bribes and drug-trafficking profits. When Lalín filed a lawsuit in 2004 in Uruguay against businessman Adrián Troche, on a matter involving player transactions, only to withdraw the suit shortly thereafter, a Uruguayan news source suggested that he had probably withdrawn it because he realized that he would have had to explain to the Uruguayan judiciary why his payments in the transactions in question had been made through Grupo Mercado Abierto.

Also in 2004, it was reported that there were “very strong indications” that player transfers and other activities by Lalín were tied up with money laundering in Uruguayan football. In addition, it was reported that funds paid to Lalín as part of several player transactions had not ended up in the club treasury but rather in Mercado Abierto SA and MA – House Rates accounts at the Bank of New York.

One 2004 report indicated that Lalín had engaged in business operations that enabled him to skirt hundreds of thousands of dollars in tax payments. Another report the same year stated that Lalín had “evaded nearly two million dollars in taxes.”

In 2006, it was reported that Lalín was “seeking his place in la Argentina K” – in other words, in the business circles surrounding the Kirchners. Through a holding company, Lalín Global Group, he closed a deal in that year with the Chinese firm JHP, which had subsidiaries in Libya and Kazakhstan. One source states that Lalín, via his firm Maxipetrol-Petroleros de Occidente, turned himself into “a local intermediary of the two Chinese corporations JHP International Petroleum Engineering and New Times Energy Corporation” and became “a pivot in the Chinese appropriation of [Argentinian] oil.”

In association with JHP, Lalín formed Oxipetrol, a multinational oil exploration firm, in April 2006. The plan was for the Argentinian partners to contribute familiarity with the local market, while the Chinese contributed scientific expertise. It was reported in that year that Lalín had other Chinese business contacts, and that he was serving as the regional representative of Shenzhen Our International Technology & Science, a developer of medical technology. One article described him as an “intermediary in the Kircherist ‘strategic association’ with Chinese monopolies.”

Another 2006 report identified Lalín and his friend José Luis Manzano Menem, a former Interior Minister, as “two of the leading exponents of an unexpected transformation in the energy world” on account of their large investments in oil exploration. Involved with them in these activities, it was reported, were “K businessman” Cristóbal López and Roberto Monti. (“K businessman,” “K politician,” and similar labels are Argentinian shorthand for persons with close connections to the Kirchner government.) The four men were described as “emerging national oil bourgeoisie.” The same article stated that Lalín and media entrepreneur Daniel Vila had jointly made “inroads into the territory of ‘K governor’ Julio Cobos” (who at the time was governor of Mendoza province), together proffering a successful bid for the firm Aguas de Mendoza and an unsuccessful bid for the energy company Edemsa.

A 2007 article described Oxipetrol as performing successfully. In that same year, South American Hedge Fund LLC, a subsidiary of Arizona-based Delta Mutual, Inc., paid the Kirchner administration $1.7 million for drilling rights to oil fields owned by Oxipetrol. The next year, Lalín’s friend Peralta and Peralta’s wife, Laura, bought a controlling interest in Delta, through which they sold and purchased oil leases. In 2007, Oxipetrol’s oil fields were valued at $2.7 million; two years later, New Times Group Holdings, based in Hong Kong, bought 60 percent of two of the oil fields for $270 million. In November 2012, Peralta and his wife, Laura, were found shot to death in their home in Scottsdale, Arizona. Although the deaths were ruled a murder-suicide, some individuals close to the couple suggested that their death was connected to their oil activities.

It was reported in 2008 that Lalín was still hoping to regain control of Racing. When he sought re-election to the presidency of the club, he received only about 500 votes, which he considered “a hard blow to his pride.” Lalín said in March 2013 that he was still “very involved in the politics of Racing,” that he talked frequently with “the people at Racing,” and that it was hurtful to him that some people believe he had “stolen” from Racing. In September 2013 he reiterated his desire to resume control of Racing and harshly criticized its current management.

“I had a lot of luck,” Lalín stated in an interview from 2010, referring to a profit of $63 million he had earned the previous year. A 2014 report by Bloomberg News identified Lalín as one of several Kirchner intimates who had benefited from the illegal awarding of oil leases. Lalín acknowledged that he had obtained the leases through contacts. “Contacts are everything in Peronism,” he said. “Oil experience helps, but the contacts are what matters.”

== Personal life ==
As of 2008, Lalín was involved with a personal trainer named Laura.
