= Canal 7 =

Canal 7 may refer to:

- Canal 7 of Buenos Aires, Argentina
- Canal 7 of Lima, Peru
- Canal 7 of Mendoza, Argentina
- Canal 7 of Mexico City, Mexico
- Canal 7 of Quito, Ecuador
- Canal 7 of Santiago, Chile
- Canal 7 of La Paz, Bolivia
- Canal 7 of Murcia, Spain
- Canal 7 of San José, Costa Rica
- Super Siete of Puerto Rico
