= Grupo América =

Company based in Argentina

- Type: Private
- Industry: Mass media
- Founded: 1983
- Headquarters: Mendoza, Argentina
- Key people: Luis María Casero. CEO; Daniel Vila, President; Eduardo Vila, chief executive José Luis Manzano, Shareholder; Agustín Vila, Shareholder
- Brands: List: Diario UNO (Note: Entre Ríos, San Rafael, and Mendoza divisions.); El Cronista; Sanjuan8.com; América TV; A24; Channel 10 Junín; América Tucuman; LR5 Radio La Red Bs.As.; LS5 Radio Rivadavia (Bs.As.); LV6 Radio Nihuil (Las Heras); Radio Calingasta (San Juan); FM del Litoral (Concordia); Radio Victoria (Entre Ríos); Radio UNO (Bs.As.); FM Montecristo (Mendoza); FM Brava (Mendoza); FM Ayer (Mendoza); FM Latinos (Mendoza); FM Nuestra (San Juan)
- Services: Newspapers; Newsprint; Cable television Radio broadcasting Internet service
- Subsidiaries: Edelcos
- Website: grupoamerica.com

Grupo América, formerly known as Grupo UNO Medios and also referred to as the Vila-Manzano Group, is a multimedia company in Argentina. It was founded by Mendoza-based entrepreneurs Daniel Vila and José Luis Manzano, a former politician and businessman. The group owns América TV, in partnership with businessman Claudio Belocopitt, and controls multiple television channels, newspapers, radio stations, and digital platforms throughout Argentina.

The company’s major media holdings include, Channel 10 of Junín, Radio Nihuil, Diario UNO Mendoza, and La Capital Multimedia of Rosario. In April 2017, Grupo América relaunched the A24 news channel with a new programming lineup.

In 2019 the group sold the newspapers La Capital, Diario UNO Sante Fe and the radio stations La OCHO and FM Del Siglo to a holding group owned by businessman Gustavo Scaglione.

Previously, Grupo América owned Supercanal, a cable television operator, but it was sold in July 2018 to CVI Austral LLP for approximately US$180 million.

== Ownership and programming ==
In November 2024, Grupo América announced changes to its ownership structure. Gustavo Scaglione, owner of Grupo Televisión Litoral, bought out shares from Gabriel Hochbaum. Grupo Televisión Litoral owns multiple media outlets in Santa Fe and other provinces of Argentina, expanding Grupo América’s regional presence.

In 2024, Juan Cruz Ávila was appointed as the new CEO of Grupo América. Later in the year, the company announced programming modifications for its news channel A24. Several journalists from competing networks LN+ and TN joined the group. From LN came Eduardo Feinmann, Antonio Laje, Luis Novaresio, Esteban Trebucq, and Pablo Rossi. From TN was Nicolás Wiñazki, Sergio Lapegüe, and Santiago Fioriti.

== Products ==
The media owned are the following:

=== Newspapers ===
Name	Notes	Location
Diario El Cronista	Economic diary.	Buenos Aires, Argentina

=== AM/FM radios ===
Name	Location	AM/FM signal
LR5 Radio La Red	Argentina Provinces	AM 910 (Buenos Aires)
LS5 Radio Rivadavia	Argentina Provinces	AM 630 (Buenos Aires)
FM Blue	Gran Buenos Aires	FM 100.7
Radio UNO	Gran Buenos Aires	FM 103.1
LV6 Radio Nihuil	Mendoza, San Juan (South) and San Luis (West)	AM 680 - FM 98.9
Brava	Mendoza	FM 94.9
Ayer	Mendoza	FM 98.1
Montecristo	Mendoza	FM 93.7
UNA	Mendoza	FM 96.1
Latinos	Mendoza	FM 88.3
LRJ 201 Radio Calingasta	San Juan (West) and Mendoza (Northwest)	AM 990
LT15 Radio Concordia	Entre Ríos Province	AM 560
LT39 Radio Victoria	Entre Ríos Province	AM 980
FM Nuestra	Calingasta, San Juan	FM 103.5
Nuestra Radio	Entre Ríos Province	FM 90.3

=== Television ===
==== Free-to-air television ====
Indicative	Channel	Location
LS 86 TV	América TV	Gran La Plata / Gran Buenos Aires
LRH 450 TV	Canal 10	Junín, Buenos Aires
LV 89 TV	El Siete	Mendoza
LV 82 TV	Canal 8	San Juan
	América Tucumán	Tucumán

==== Cable television ====
Name	Location	Genre
América Interior	Argentina	General
América Internacional	Argentina, Latin America, the Caribbean, United States and Europe	General
América 24	Argentina, United States, Latin America, the Caribbean and Europe	News

=== Digital newspapers ===
Name	Genre
América TV	Variety
Diario UNO Mendoza	News
Diario UNO Entre Ríos	News
Sanjuan8.com	News
A24.com	News
Primicias YA	News
UNO.com.ar	Entertainments
Ovación.com.ar	Sports
Primera Fila	Fashion

== Financials ==
Grupo América reported a decline in revenue in the fourth quarter of 2024, reflecting broader economic conditions in Argentina. According to financial statements, net sales decreased by 19.3% compared to the same period in 2023. Sales outside of Argentina increased by 7.5%, highlighting a contrast between domestic and international market performance.

Despite economic challenges, Grupo América has expanded its holdings in recent years. In 2021, the company acquired Edenor, Argentina’s largest electricity distributor, marking an expansion into the utilities sector. It also bought the economic newspaper El Cronista, expanding its presence in financial journalism.
