= José Luis Manzano =

Argentine businessman and politician (born 1956)

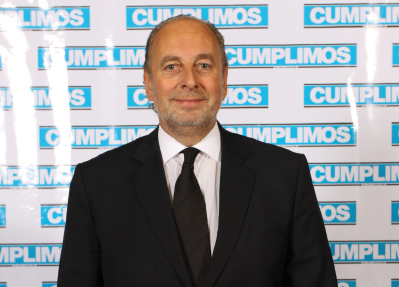
- José Luis Manzano in 2011
- Born: March 9, 1956 (age 70); Mendoza, Argentina
- Occupation: Businessman
- Political party: Justicialist Party

José Luis Manzano (born March 9, 1956) is an Argentine businessman and former politician. He is currently a partner in the second largest multimedia group in his country, Grupo América, and has investments in several economic sectors, including energy, wine, and clothing. During his time in Argentine politics, Manzano was known as a power broker and negotiator and one of the architects of the government of Carlos Menem.

Manzano holds a medical degree and completed postgraduate work in the United States. Early in his career, he served in Argentina's Congress, later serving as Minister of the Interior in the cabinet of President Carlos Saúl Menem.

In 1996, Manzano co-founded Grupo América, now Argentina’s second-largest media company, with 49 outlets across radio, TV, digital media, and print.

Manzano owns businesses in other sectors including oil and gas. He is the president of Integra Capital, an international investment firm.

He is the 83rd wealthiest person in Latin America, with a net worth between $800 million and $1.5 billion.

== Education and academic activities ==
Manzano earned a medical degree from the National University of Cuyo, specializing in occupational health. He later studied in the United States as a visiting scholar at Georgetown University and the University of California, San Diego. He has lectured internationally and received various awards.

He is also president of the Postgraduates Foundation of the Congress, in Mendoza, where he was a former member of its administration board.

In May 2026, Manzano was awarded an honorary doctorate from Polytechnic University of Tirana.

== Business activities ==
Manzano owns and runs a number of businesses in a variety of industries. He often travels around the world, speaking at conferences and panels. Through Integra Capital, founded in the mid-1990s, he consolidated operations across energy distribution, upstream oil and gas, power generation, mining, telecommunications, and infrastructure. The company has participated in projects involving natural gas distribution, hydroelectric generation, lithium exploration, and the acquisition of regional telecommunications assets.

In April 2025, Integra Tec, owned by investors Manzano and Mauricio Filiberti, acquired a 99.3% stake in Telefónica del Perú. The transaction followed the bankruptcy filing of the company’s Spanish parent firm earlier that year. The deal involved capital contributions exceeding 1.5 billion soles and aims to maintain services for the company’s 12 million customers. It also includes plans to restructure debt and develop a sustainable business model.

The telecommunications sector in Peru is undergoing significant changes following the acquisition. Manzano has committed an initial investment of US$68 million and has stated that he expects the company to become profitable by March 2026. As part of efforts to address the company’s financial challenges, Manzano is pursuing a structured bankruptcy process, including negotiating the company’s outstanding tax obligations with Peru’s tax authority, the Superintendencia Nacional de Administración Tributaria (Sunat).

Manzano has indicated that employee and supplier rights will be upheld during the restructuring. His plans for the company include improvements in service quality, technological innovation, expansion of 5G networks, and continued deployment of cell phone towers. More than 1,000 towers have been installed under the new management. He has also emphasized the company’s strong brand recognition as a strategic asset.

=== Mining and energy expansion (2023–2024) ===
In 2024, Manzano acquired lithium-rich acreage in northern Argentina and Brazil’s lithium valley, in order to mine for elements critical for the global sustainable energy transition. Additionally, he revived a potash-fertilizer project in Mendoza, aiming to boost agricultural exports and domestic production.

Manzano acquired Volcan Cia Minera SAA from Glencore Plc, which expanded Integra Capital’s presence in South America’s resource markets.

=== Integra Capital ===
Manzano owns Integra Capital, an investment firm focused on energy and mining. It has funded major projects, including oil exploration in the Golfo San Jorge Basin, Patagonia. Pipelines, electricity generation, and industrial- and personal-use water projects are also within the company's scope of investments. In the power sector, Integra put together a large investment program of nearly $100 million dedicated to modernization and creation of an intelligent grid.

=== Media ===
Resettling in Argentina in 1996, Manzano and entrepreneur Daniel Vila created UNO Medios, also known as Grupo Uno (Group One) or Group Vila-Manzano. They also established Supercanal Holding AS, now valued at more than $800 million.

Grupo Uno, in partnership with businessman Francisco de Narváez, acquired Buenos Aires TV channel América 2. Manzano and Vila expanded Grupo Uno into Argentina’s second-largest media group, controlling key channels in the Cuyo region by the late 1990s.

Today Grupo Uno has 40 media outlets throughout the country, including press, radio, television, and digital enterprises. Among the major channels is América 2, located in Buenos Aires, whose operation license was renewed during President Néstor Kirchner's administration. Through all of its media outlets, Grupo Uno reaches around 25 million people in Argentina. In addition, it is also a service supplier of Triple Play (a provider of telephone, Internet and cable television services) through the company Supercanal. Some 450,000 people in 14 Argentinian provinces subscribe to its services.

The Vila-Manzano group also bought into cable operations abroad. In 1977 it acquired 25% of Procono in Spain, and in 1997 formed Supercanal Cable Spain. The group also purchased VVC, Alvarez & Alvarez, Video Selimn, MEG, Electro Audio and Imagem Teresopolis, CATV Sat LITD, and Televisao Spectrum Systems, all in Brazil. In addition, the group owns cable operations in Bolivia and owns the Dominican television Network Supercanal. The group owns or has owned part of the magazine Primera Fila, the newspapers La Capital de Rosario and New Time, Paraná, and various radio stations.

Grupo Uno has 28 licenses between AM, FM and open television broadcasting. Manzano and Vila control channel América and its cable TV channel América24, La Red radio and newspaper networks including La Capital del Rosario and Diario UNO in Entre Rios, Mendoza and Santa Fe. With its extensive network of media services, the company reaches about 25 million people in Argentina and thus constitutes the second largest multimedia group in the country.

As one of the owners of Grupo Uno, Manzano led the partnership with China Watch, a media outlet of news and analysis about China's business, society and culture. China Watch became the first Spanish-spoken media about China.

As a co-founder of Grupo América, Manzano helped expand the group from regional broadcasters in western Argentina to one of the country’s largest private media conglomerates. The group’s assets include free-to-air television, cable news, radio networks, regional newspapers, and digital outlets. In 2025, the ownership consortium of Grupo América acquired Telefe, one of Argentina’s most-watched television networks, further increasing its national media footprint.

In late 2025–2026, Manzano joined the consortium SIETE (Servicios Integrados Entretenimiento Televisivo S.L.), which won a national TDT (digital terrestrial television) license. The Spanish Council of Ministers (under Pedro Sánchez’s PSOE government) awarded it on 26 May 2026 after a public contest convened in October 2025 for capacity in multiplex MPE5. SIETE beat Mediaset’s bid. The license is for 15 years (renewable). The channel is scheduled to launch around 5 November 2026—just weeks before Spain’s general elections on 29 November.

==== Holdings ====
As of 2001, the Vila-Manzano group, through Supercanal Holding SA and other firms, controlled dozens of cable-TV enterprises across Argentina.

The group also owns or has owned the magazine Primera Fila, in Mendoza; the daily newspapers La Capital and El Ciudadano, Rosario; el periódico Nueva Hora de Paraná; Canal 7 in Mendoza, Canal 8, Radio AM Calingasta and Radio FM Nuestra, in San Juan; Megavisión SA (Siempre Mujer) and Radio Rivadavia, among others.

=== Energy and oil ===
Manzano and Vila are also leaders in the electricity sector through Edemsa, a private-public company that provides electricity to Mendoza province. The two men created Andes Energía, a Latin American energy group dedicated to the exploration, development and production of conventional and non-conventional oil and gas. The company operates in Argentina with 24 licenses. In Colombia, it currently has 11 licenses for oil investments. The company is listed on the stock exchanges in London and Buenos Aires, and is part of an operating holding company with subsidiaries including Kilwer, Ketsal, Grecoil and Interoil.

Manzano’s long-term partnership with the Swiss commodity trading firm Mercuria has supported several of these energy ventures. In 2017, the merger of Andes Energía with Petrolera El Trébol formed Phoenix Global Resources, which holds significant acreage in Vaca Muerta and other basins. Integra Capital remains involved in upstream, midstream, and downstream energy activities through multiple subsidiaries.

In July 2017, Andes Energía merged with Petrolera El Trebol (PETSA), an Argentine subsidiary of Switzerland's Mercuria. The merger created the new company Phoenix Global Resources and it has a strong presence in the country's most prolific conventional and non-conventional oil basins. Its main objective is the development of the Vaca Muerta field in both Neuquén and Mendoza.

Manzano and Vila secured a $60 million deal with Mercuria, a major hydrocarbon trader. This included a $20 million debt settlement for drilling in Chachaheun and a $40 million credit line for Vaca Muerta and other projects.

In addition, Manzano has investments in the oil sector through the firm Ketsal/Kilwer. Within the last few years, the business has been awarded exploitation contracts in southern Argentina, an area of great oil extraction potential.

Manzano and Vila also control Hidroeléctrica Ameghino S.A. (an electricity generating plant) in Chubut Province. The plant is connected to the Patagonic Electric System and provides an annual 174 Gwh of electricity.

In 2013, Vila and Manzano bought 49.9% of the UTE (Transitory Union of Companies) led by El Trebol to exploit the Chañares Herrados and Puesto Pozo Cercado deposits in Tupungato (concessioned until 2017). The operation was carried out with Mercuria, the holding company owner of El Trébol. They signed an agreement with a Brazilian oil company named Imetame Energia to explore their fields in Brazil.

In June 2026, Mercuria Energy Group, a Swiss-based energy trader and Manzano's partner in Phoenix Global Resources (an oil and gas company operating in Vaca Muerta), acquired the full downstream operations of Raízen Argentina for $1.42 billion USD. The transactions include 894 Shell-branded service stations (representing about 18-19% of Argentina's fuel retail market), the Dock Sud refinery, a lubricants plant in Buenos Aires, aviation fuel facilities at Ezeiza and Aeroparque airports, and fuel terminals in Arroyo Seco and Santa Fe.

=== Construction ===
Manzano also works with Vila in the construction industry through their industrial construction company Pamar SA, which specializes in building gas pipelines and has more than 35 years of experience in the market. Pamar works in Latin American countries creating oil and gas pipelines, process plants, electricity distribution networks, fiber optic networks and sanitation works. Pamar S.A. was recognized as the leader of the "Central West Gas Pipeline System", the largest of its kind in Argentina, covering more than 500 kilometers. Its biggest customers are YPF, TGS, TGN and EDEMSA.

The Vila-Manzano group became part of Metrogas, after British Gas (BG) agreed to sell its holdings to the company Integra Gas Distribution LLC, owned by the Mendoza holding company. This deal would have given Integra Capital control over 7% of the company's shares.

However on 30 November 2012 state owned company YPF exercised their pre-emption right and bought all the shares that Integra had bought, alongside the rest of the shares that were still controlled by British Gas.

In August 2026, Manzano's power distribution company Edenor won YPF's sale process for a 70% stake in Metrogas, Argentina's leading natural gas distributor, with an offer of $780 million. Edenor, which Manzano controls alongside Daniel Vila and Mauricio Filiberti, beat out four other bidders including Central Puerto and Grupo Pierri. The deal builds on Manzano's existing 9.23% stake in Metrogas and gives him control of both the country's largest power distributor and its leading gas distributor.

=== Wine production ===
In 1998, Manzano entered the wine industry. He created Grupo Vitivinícola de Tupungato, which operates Los Algarrobos estate in San Juan, and vineyards and a winery in Tupungato, Mendoza.

In the same building as the winery is a restaurant known as La Tupiña in Gualtallary, owned by the Viticulture Group of Tupungato.

== Political activities ==
Earlier in his career, Manzano was active in Argentine politics. He served as Secretary General of the Justicialist Party and was an elected member the National Congress. Manzano quickly rose through the ranks to become the majority leader from 1983 to 1991. President Carlos Menem appointed Manzano to his cabinet, where he served as Homeland Security Minister. On August 12, 1991, he was appointed Minister of the Interior.

He was known as a power broker who other members had to go through to get anything done. He is credited with helping pass economic reforms (the opening of the economy) and government reforms during the Menem administration.

Manzano was a key figure in 'La Renovación Peronista,' helping to reorganize the party after its electoral defeat. He has been called "a symbol of the late-80s renewal of Peronism."

During his political career, Manzano was first vice president, and then president, of the Deputies Block of the Justicialist Party (PJ).

In 1983 he was a national deputy. As a member of the Chamber of Deputies of The Nation, he participated in the approval of the legislative bill on the modification of the civil marriage regime, being one of the main speakers of the discussion sessions prior to the final sanction of Law 23,515 (Divorce Law) in 1987.

In 1991, as Minister of the Interior and leader of the federal security forces, he played a key role in investigating the abduction of the businessman Mauricio Macri.

In 2008 Manzano was honored in Argentina's parliament (the National Congress of Argentina) along with other former members who had taken their seats in 1983, for helping to reconstruct Argentina's returning democracy.

=== United States ===
From 1993 to 1995 Manzano lived in the United States where he began to develop his career in the private sector acting as an international consultant. He lived in Washington, D.C., in 1994 where he associated himself with Republican Party politicians. In 1995, he studied English and American domestic policy at the University of San Diego, and created a consulting firm called Integra Investments S.A., where he serves as the company's president. While living in the US, Manzano worked for Cuban-American businessman Jorge Mas Canosa, representing Mas Canosa's business interests in Central America and Argentina. In 1996 Mas Canosa provided the initial funding for the creation of Supercanal Holding S.A. In late 1995, after spending two years away from Argentina, he returned home with plans of pursuing a business career.

== Philanthropy ==
José Luis Manzano contributes to social, cultural and educational causes. He works with the Vendimia Solidaria program, which works toward the development of children and adolescents in the Province of Mendoza by providing financial assistance and promoting actions for the benefit of hospitals, neighborhood sports clubs and schools.

He also participates in the La Capital Foundation, a Rosario organization whose objective is to promote and disseminate spaces for cultural production, debate and academic formation and promote volunteering and social responsibility.

Manzano is sponsor of the House of Chinese Culture in Buenos Aires and president of the foundation of the University of Congress. He has also contributed to the Clinton Foundation and to The Climate Reality Project, a foundation founded by former U.S. Vice President Al Gore that seeks to raise awareness about environmental issues such as climate change.

== Personal life ==
On February 21, 2015, Manzano married Teresa Jordan, who is his partner since 2000. The event was held at his estate in Gualtallary, Tupungato. He has four children.

Manzano lives in Switzerland, and travels to Argentina for business activities.
