= Channel 10 (Junín, Argentina) =

TV station in Junín, Argentina

LRH 450 TV Canal 10
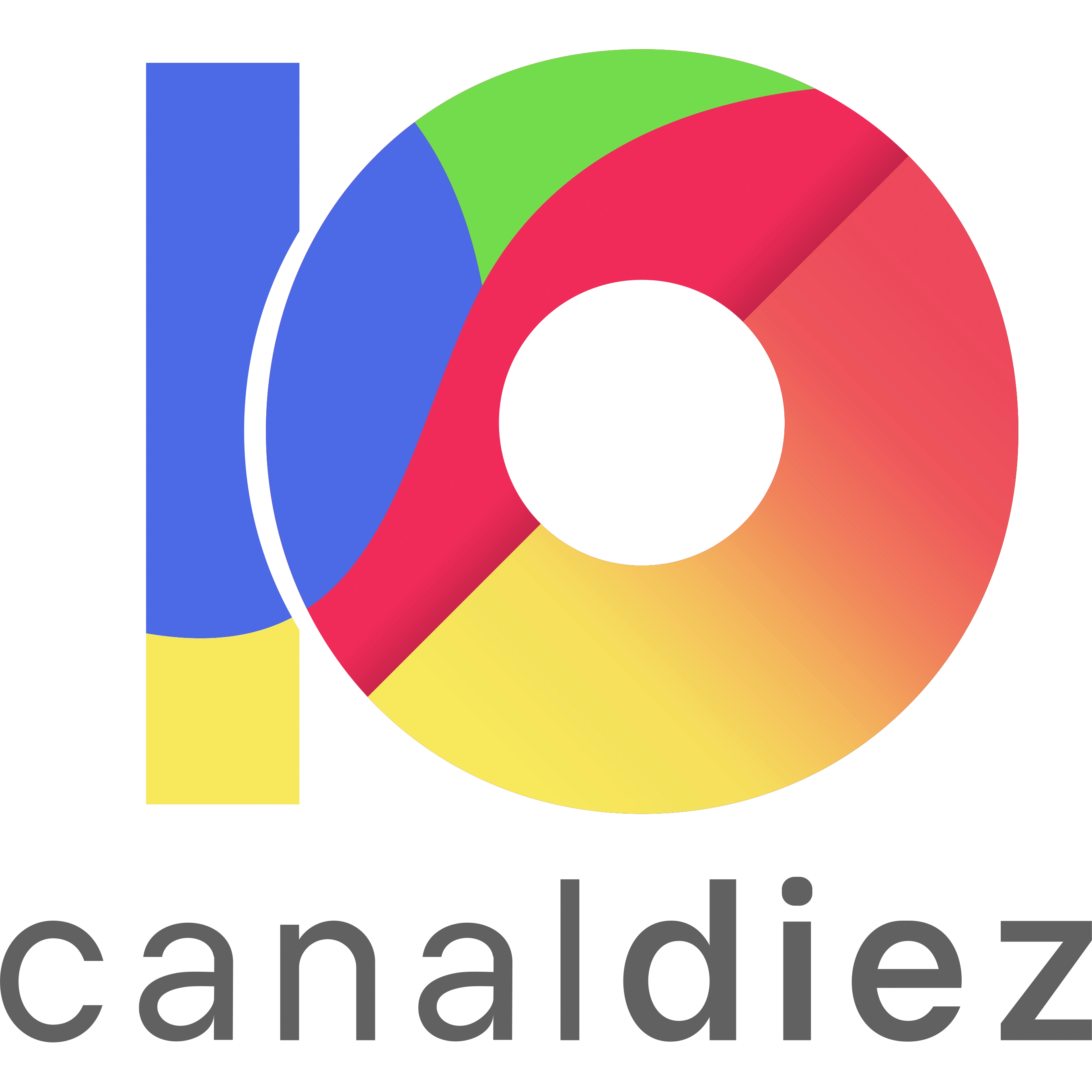
- Junín, Buenos Aires; Argentina
- Channels: Analog: 10 (VHF)
- Branding: Canal Diez Junín; Canal Diez

Programming
- Affiliations: América TV

Ownership
- Owner: Grupo América (85%) Martín Eurnekian (15%); (Junín TV, S.A.)

History
- First air date: October 4, 1985

Technical information
- Licensing authority: ENACOM
- Translator(s): 12 (Nueve de Julio)

Junín TV (call sign LRH 450 TV) is a television station broadcasting on channel 10 from Junín, Buenos Aires. The station carries programs from América TV

== History ==
On May 6, 1983, by means of Decree nº 1061, the National Executive Cabinet granted Junín TV S.R.L. a license to exploit a television station on VHF channel 10 in the city of Junín, Buenos Aires Province. The company was made up of Don Mario Pizzolo and Doña María Gauchat de Pizzolo.

The license started its regular broadcasts on December 4, 1985 as LRH 450 TV Canal 10 de Junín. However, the same founding partners were owners of the same licensee (converted into Junín TV S.A. in 1986).

On September 23, 1987, Comfer, by means of Resolution nº 502 authorized Junín TV (owner of Channel 10) the installation of relay stations in Chivilcoy and Pergamino, assigning each relay station channels 8 and 12 respectively; however, on January 26, 1988 (by means of Resolución nº 22), Resolution nº 502/88 annulled the construction permit; except the Chivilcoy repeater (channel 12).

In August 1999, by means of Resolution nº 265, the Secretariat of Communications authorized Channel 10 to make digital terrestrial test broadcasts in the ATSC standard chosen the previous year. For this end, VHF channel 11 was granted.

In 2002, Channel 10 (which at that time was owned by businessman Carlos Ávila) and its sister channels América TV and CVN Cablevisión Noticias (currently A24), became part of the Multimedios América group, made up of Ávila, Daniel Vila (from Grupo UNO, currently Grupo América, which put 3 television channels and their percentage in the Diario La Primera) and Eduardo Eurnekian.

== Local programming ==
- Videoprensa Pulsable en Línea, Te Cuento al Mediodía, Las 20 en Llamas, - 3 Local Newscasts with 3 editions at 6:00, 13:00 and 20:00
- Consulta Médica ("Medical Consultation") - health advice
