= Juan Carlos Rousselot =

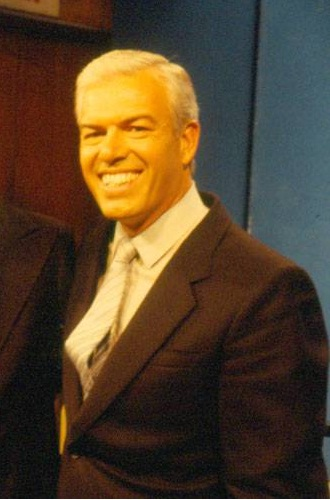

Mayor of Morón
- In office December 10, 1991 – March 16, 1999
- Preceded by: César Arias
- Succeeded by: Guillermo Crespo
- In office December 10, 1987 – April 19, 1989
- Preceded by: Norberto García Silva
- Succeeded by: César Arias

Personal details
- Born: June 24, 1935 Árbol Solo, Chaco Province
- Died: July 8, 2010 (aged 75) Buenos Aires
- Party: Justicialist Party

Juan Carlos Rousselot (June 24, 1935 – July 8, 2010) was an Argentine radio and television personality, newspaper publisher, and former mayor of the Greater Buenos Aires suburb of Morón.

== Life and times ==
=== Early life and career ===
Rousselot was born in Árbol Solo, a rural outpost in Tapenagá Department, Chaco Province, in 1935. He debuted on Argentine radio at age 18 when he stood in for an absent broadcaster on LT5 Radio Chaco. He later worked the news daily El Territorio, and in 1958, relocated to Buenos Aires, where he joined Radio El Mundo.

Rousselot hosted a talent show on Radio Rivadavia from 1964. He later became a television anchorman on a Channel 11 evening news program, El Diario Alpargatas; where he covered the 1969 Apollo 11 Moon landing live. He was appointed spokesman for the Argentine Navy in 1972, and in 1973, for the Minister of Social Welfare and head of the Argentine Anticommunist Alliance, José López Rega.

Obtaining a loan from the Ministry, he relocated to Resistencia, capital of his native Chaco Province, and purchased an ailing news daily, Diario Norte, persuading his brother, Ricardo, to join him from Chicago. He also served as director of Public Television from May to August 1975. Following the March 1976 coup, Rousselot was arrested and his newspaper was placed under provincial receivership. Its subsequent purchase by Editorial Chaco in 1978 was alleged in a 1996 lawsuit by Rousselot to have been paid with El Norte's own profits, and at far below its market value.

=== Mayor of Morón ===
He later relocated to Mar del Plata and, in the early 1980s, to El Palomar, where he became a member of the local Justicialist Party committee. His name recognition, television experience, and marquée smile made Rousselot a natural candidate for mayoral elections in Morón (which at the time had jurisdiction over El Palomar), and in 1987, he was elected to the post.

Rousselot became known as one of the "twelve apostles" (Peronist figures in politics and labor who supported La Rioja Province Governor Carlos Menem over Buenos Aires Governor Antonio Cafiero for the Justicialist Party presidential nomination in 1988), and unsuccessfully sought the vice presidential nod when Menem was indeed nominated. He emphasized public works as mayor, initiating the construction of new streets and an extension of the sewage system, among other projects. The numerous contracts he signed for these projects became the subject of a corruption investigation by the City Council, however, and the 24-person body (in which Rousselot had but four allies), voted to impeach the mayor on April 19, 1989.

Rousselot was appointed Cultural Attaché at the Embassy in Paraguay. He faulted Cafiero for what he considered political persecution, and was subsequently exonerated on 28 charges related to these contracts. He ran again for Mayor of Morón in 1991, and was returned to office with 64% of the vote. He was re-elected in 1995, though ultimately the issue of city contracts would again lead to his downfall. Citing irregularities in parking meter and hospital contracts, Mayor Rousselot was again impeached on March 16, 1999, and on March 19, he was arrested at his home in Haedo. He maintained that this resulted from his opposition to Governor Eduardo Duhalde (President Menem's leading rival within Peronism at the time).

=== Later life ===
Rousselot was convicted in 2000 of extortion and of allocating us$225,000 for the transfer of a hospital without City Council approval, receiving a suspended sentence. Pursuant to the latter sentence, he was arrested in 2001 at the Ministro Pistarini International Airport on suspicion of attempting to flee the country (a violation of the terms of the sentence).

He was barred from holding public office, though never convicted of embezzlement. He later returned to radio broadcasting as a host in Radio Colonia (Colonia del Sacramento, Uruguay). Rousselot developed cancer, and died in Buenos Aires in 2010.
