= Lalin =

Lalin may refer to:

== Places ==
- Lalin, Iran, a city in Hamadan, Iran
- Lalin, Poland, a village in Subcarpathia, Poland
- Lalín, a municipality in Galicia, Spain

== Surnames ==
- Lalín (surname)
