= América TV =

Argentine television station and network

América TV (LS 86 TV Canal 2)
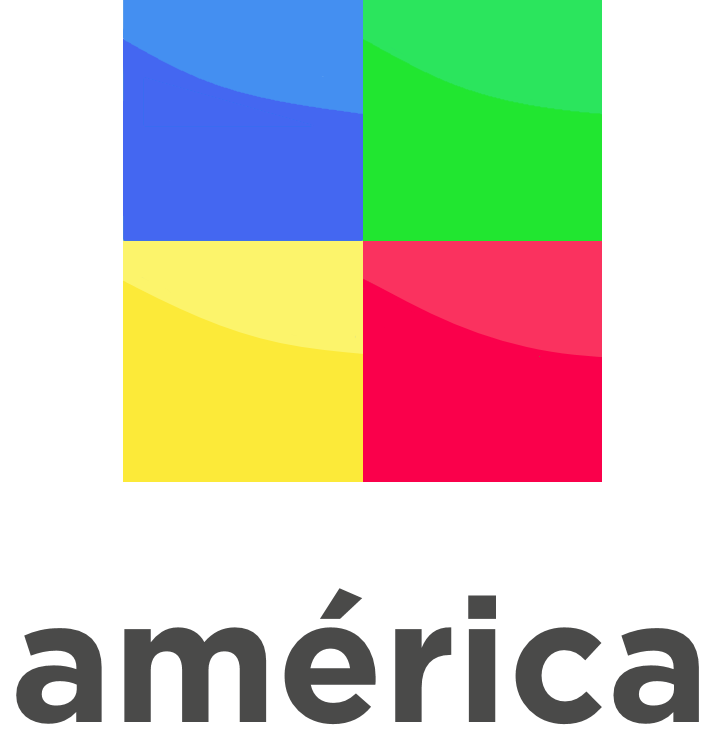
- Logo used since 2020
- La Plata, Buenos Aires; Argentina
- Channels: Analog: 2 (VHF); Digital: 36 (UHF)
- Branding: América

Ownership
- Owner: Grupo América; (America TV S.A.)
- Sister stations: América 24; El Siete; Canal Ocho; Canal 10; América Tucumán

History
- First air date: June 25, 1966; 60 years ago
- Former names: Tevedos (1966–1979, 1988–1991); Canal 2 (1979–1987); Teledos (1987–1988); América Te Ve (1991–1994); América 2 (1994–1995)

Technical information
- Licensing authority: ENACOM
- ERP: 30 kW
- Transmitter coordinates: 34°50′32″S 58°12′14″W
- Repeaters: List: 3 (Dolores); 5 (Las Flores); 8 (25 de Mayo); 45 (Roque Pérez)

Links
- Webcast: www.americatv.com.ar/vivo
- Website: www.americatv.com.ar

América TV (call sign LS 86 TV, also known as América) is an Argentine television station broadcasting on channel 2 in La Plata, Buenos Aires Province, and one of Argentina's five national television networks. It is owned by Grupo América as its flagship television property.

América TV maintains studio facilities and offices located in Palermo neighborhood of Buenos Aires; its transmitter is located in the Florencio Varela Partido, Buenos Aires Province. Outside of Greater Buenos Aires, América is available on cable & satellite nationally, and its programs are rebroadcast by two broadcast stations owned by Grupo América within the country—Channel 7 Mendoza and Channel 8 San Juan—plus two affiliates, Canal 10 in Junín and América Tucumán in Tucumán.

== History ==
=== 1966: Founding ===
Channel 2 in La Plata was launched on 25 June 1966 as Tevedos, under the ownership of Rivadavia Televisión S.A., whose owners also had several radio stations and the now-defunct El Mundo daily newspaper.

La Plata is close in proximity to Buenos Aires, and the two cities can receive each other's television broadcasts. This geographical reality led Tevedos to target the much larger media market of Argentina's capital. But with transmission facilities in Florencio Varela to the south, northern portions of the metropolitan area couldn't receive an adequate signal. This stood in contrast to the other four stations in Buenos Aires, which had their transmitters located in the city proper.

=== 1970–76 ===
In the early 1970s, trouble continually plagued the channel, stemming from its technical disadvantages. The ratings for Argentinian television were measured in Buenos Aires, and its comparatively poor signal could not offer the same coverage as its four competitors. Comedians joked about the station's small 7% market share by dubbing it "James Bond", a pun of his "007" codename. To lower costs, it began airing cheaper programs, even simulcasting Canal 13 at times.

=== 1976–87: State ownership ===
In 1976, the Province of Buenos Aires expropriated the station, and in 1979, it was transferred to the provincial level Ministry of Economy as a statutory enterprise. That same year, the station became known as simply Canal 2 (channel 2). Colour broadcasts, which began in 1980, the same year as national station Channel 13, made it the third station to switch to colour broadcasting and the first TV station outside Buenos Aires itself to do so.

After the fall of the dictatorship and return to democracy in 1983, a bid was hurriedly opened for companies wanting to purchase the station. Radiodifusora El Carmen S.A. won the license, but it took four years for the company to find a partner with the technical capacity to run the station. Finally, in December 1987, El Carmen partnered with Héctor Ricardo García, owner of the Crónica newspaper, and his company Estrella Producciones S.A., the former owners of Channel 11 (now Telefe) and with the new owners came a new brand: Teledos.

=== 1987–91: Teledos, a crisis and Tevedos ===
Within a month, Teledos, now Argentina's second private television channel, rocketed to second place in ratings, leaving behind the station's long cellar dweller past. Teledos had taken a tight second, just ahead of Canal 13, but behind the ratings monster that was Alejandro Romay's Canal 9, which still brought in double the viewership. Newer and fresher hosts, forgotten by the state-owned ATC, channel 11 and channel 13, headed up a refreshed outlet with a heavy emphasis on news and current affairs programming with Teledos Noticias as flagship.

The resurgence, however, would not last long. The shareholders in El Carmen were in bitter legal disputes, which boiled over in November 1988. García promptly pulled all of his programming and left. A crisis now emerged, as Canal 2 was left with very little programming to air. The TV Guía publication proclaimed the situation as a tormenta. Without studio space of its own, the station had to record its newscasts three hours in advance and drive the film by car to its La Plata transmitter, for there was no connection between the Buenos Aires facilities it was using and its own physical plant. By the end of the year, a new name had emerged: Tevedos returned. However, the precarious financial state that the channel was in led to bankruptcy reorganization in 1989, out of which Eduardo Eurnékian, owner of the Cablevisión cable system and several radio stations in the capital city, bought the channel and incorporated it into his new multimedia group, Corporación Multimedios América.

=== 1991–2002 ===
On April 15, 1991, Tevedos was rebranded as América Te Ve, but Eurnékian's biggest change would be in facilities. In 1994, what was now known as América 2 moved its studios—and, more importantly, its transmitter—to the Palermo neighborhood of Buenos Aires, improving its terrestrial reception and becoming the first of the major Argentine broadcasters to possess digital television equipment. The next year, the channel was again rebranded as América Televisión (or just América).

Eurnékian pulled out of his multimedia ventures during the 1990s; in 2000, the station became part of a group controlled by Carlos Ávila and his family. Ávila had created Torneos y Competencias, the longtime rights holder to Argentine soccer and producer of other sports events. Under Ávila, América's programming would have a strong emphasis on sports and news.

=== 2002–present ===
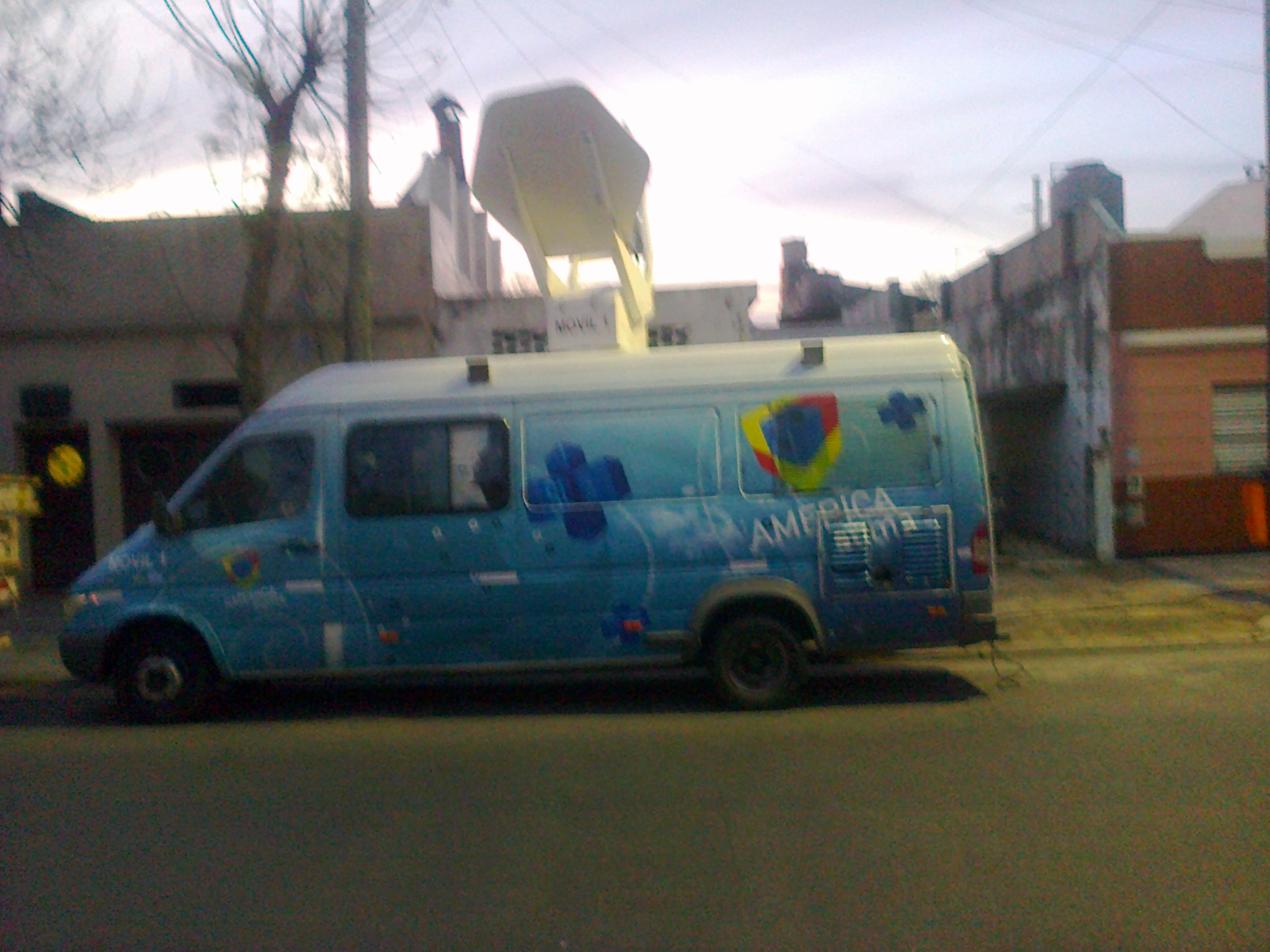
Truck of América TV

In 2002, a major economic crisis almost carried the channel into bankruptcy; the Ávila family connected América to the Grupo América multimedia company, and after a reorganization, the station was able to emerge from bankruptcy and maintain its license, despite a strong challenge mounted by Héctor Ricardo García.

In 2005, two of the most popular programs on the network moved to Canal 13 after the program Televisión Registrada invited a guest who had been charged with bribing the Argentinian Senate. The station's news director apparently refused to allow the program to air, and as a result, both Television Registrada and Indomables left América. In that same year, Francisco de Narváez bought a majority stake in the channel.

Currently, América occupies fourth place in the ratings, slightly behind Canal 9 in the competition for third place.

In 2015, América TV broadcast its first Reality Show: Gran Hermano Argentina 2015.

It also has subsidiary channels of Paraguay, Uruguay and Chile.

== Digital terrestrial television ==
=== Subchannels ===
Subchannels
Channel	Res.	Programming
36.1	1080i	Main América TV programming (HD version)
36.3	576i	A24 (4:3)
36.31	240p	Main América TV programming (SD version)

== Rebroadcasters ==
América TV is rebroadcast on the following translator stations:

List of translators
Channel	City
3	Dolores
5	Las Flores
8	25 de Mayo
45	Roque Pérez

It was previously broadcast on channel 71 at Lezama.
