= Buenos Aires Herald =

Argentinian newspaper

- Type: Weekly newspaper (1876-1877); Daily newspaper (1877-2016); Weekly newspaper (2016-2017); Online newspaper (since 2023)
- Format: Berliner
- Owner: Editorial Amfin S.A. Grupo Indalo
- Editor: Estefanía Pozzo (new online edition)
- Founded: 1876
- Language: English
- Circulation: 5,000 until its shutdown
- Website: www.buenosairesherald.com

The Buenos Aires Herald is an English-language online newspaper. Originally published as a daily newspaper in Buenos Aires, Argentina, from 1876 to 2017, its slogans were A World of Information in a Few Words and Unbiased press, a better society. The online format began on 24 March 2023.

== History ==
Under the original name of The Herald, it was founded on 15 September 1876 by Scottish immigrant William Cathcart. At first it consisted of a single sheet with advertising on the front and mostly shipping coverage on the back. When Cathcart sold the paper a year later, it changed from a weekly to a daily format, focusing on more typical newspaper content, but always with a large shipping section. It quickly became the main source of local information for the English-speaking population of Buenos Aires.

In 1925 the Rugeroni brothers, Junius Julius and Claude Ronald, bought the paper.

The Evening Post Publishing Company from Charleston, South Carolina, United States, purchased a controlling interest in Junius Rugeroni's holdings in 1968.

During the military dictatorship in Argentina (1976–1983), the Buenos Aires Herald, under the direction of the British journalist Robert Cox, was one of the few local media that told the story of the forced disappearances of people from the opposition to the regime. The Buenos Aires Herald's brave stance stood out among the Argentine press leading to controversy within the readership, as the English-speaking newspaper had been traditionally anti-Peronist and had supported all the military coups throughout the 20th century. Andrew Graham-Yooll headed the reports of a growing wave of “disappeared” and the violations on human rights. In September 1976, he and his family were forced into exile.

In 1979, Cox was detained for a while and his family received threats, and an attempt was made to kidnap his wife. They were also forced to leave the country. In that year, the editor still believed that dictator Jorge Rafael Videla was under pressure of the far-right military. Following these departures, the threats continued against Cox's replacement, James Neilson and against Dan Newland as the newspaper's main editorial writers.

Author and journalist Uki Goñi worked for the Herald in 1975–83, first as a collaborator and from April 1977 until January 1983 as a full-time journalist and national news editor, publishing reports of the "disappearances" carried out by the dictatorship as they happened. Goñi later went on to write Op-Eds for The New York Times, write on a regular basis for The Guardian and the New York Review of Books. His 1996 book "El Infiltrado" about the crimes of the dictatorship and the Buenos Aires Herald would help condemn Navy officers in the 2011 ESMA trial and Goñi himself would be a witness in this trial.

In 2017, Amazon Prime premiered a documentary titled Messenger on a White Horse about the brave role played by editor Robert Cox standing up to the dictatorship.

The newspaper's opposition against the military regime between 1976 and 1983 led to constant threats, despite the Herald backing what it considered the "moderate" sector of the dictatorship. Shortly after the coup, in 1976, staff writer Andrew Graham-Yooll was forced into exile. At the time, Graham-Yooll was also writing for The Daily Telegraph of Britain. He returned to The Buenos Aires Herald as editor-in-chief in 1994.

Columnist Eric Ehrmann wrote for the paper during the transition from dictatorship to democracy (1985–1990) under the editorships of Dan Newland, James Neilson and others. His articles discussed the proliferation risks associated with the controversial Cóndor (Tammuz) medium-range guided missile system being built by Argentina and Iraqi Ba'ath Party strongman Saddam Hussein along with European companies and controversial dual-use issues that caused Argentina to ratify the Nuclear Nonproliferation Treaty. Ehrmann was simultaneously writing columns about Southern Cone politics for the American periodicals The Christian Science Monitor and National Review.

During the Malvinas/Falkland war, in 1982, Cox, Graham-Yooll and Neilson accused the Herald's then-editors of submitting to the chauvinist stance of the dictatorship, although the newspaper continued reporting on human rights violations.

In the 1990s, as a result of the aging of English-speaking readership and the diversification of access to news through the internet, the Herald faced severe financial difficulties. The newspaper largely abandoned the editorial stance of memory, truth, and justice that had made it world famous during the dictatorship. Graham-Yooll, who returned to the Herald in 1994, struggled to make the Herald a newspaper focused on business and community.

In 1998, the Evening Post Publishing Company became the sole owner of the newspaper. On 15 December 2007 the Argentine businessman Sergio Szpolski bought the newspaper and added it to his multimedia holdings. Almost a year later, Szpolski sold it to Amfin, which publishes the financial newspaper Ámbito Financiero

As Editor-in-Chief Peter Johson got sick, Vignatti appointed Ámbito Financiero columnist on international affairs Carolina Barros to head the Herald, in 2011. Robert Cox returned to the newspaper as a columnist after more than thirty years of absence. Barros left the paper in April 2013 to become the head of institutional affairs of Corporación América, Eduardo Eurnekian's company. Journalist Sebastián Lacunza, editor at Ámbito Financiero's international desk, was appointed editor-in-chief. Since then until the shutdown of the paper, in 2017, the Buenos Aires Herald resumed a progressive approach to human and civil rights.

In February 2015, the Indalo Group, owned by Cristóbal López and Fabián de Souza, businessmen with close ties to Cristina Fernández de Kirchner and Máximo Kirchner, bought the Herald from Vignatti. However, the newspaper held an independent line and avoided the polarization of the Argentine media.

In January 2015, Damián Pachter, a journalist for the Herald's online version, broke the news of prosecutor Alberto Nisman's death to the country on Twitter. Nisman died the day before he was set to give details at Congress regarding his legal charges against President Cristina Fernández de Kirchner for allegedly covering up the investigation into the 1994 AMIA Jewish community centre bombings. Pachter's source remains unknown, and the journalist fled Argentina for Israel subsequently, saying he feared for his life. Journalists at the paper's editorial office later said that Patcher never told them that he had been threatened, and that he said that he was leaving the newspaper because of health problems.

On Friday 28 July 2017, the last edition of the only English-language daily newspaper in Latin America was published. The paper became a weekly newspaper after the last daily edition on 26 October 2016, shedding most of its staff after "facing difficulties for a while now", but with the drop in circulation it was not able to survive financially.

However, on 24 March 2023, the Buenos Aires Herald was relaunched as an online newspaper.

== Books ==
- Cox, David. Dirty Secrets, Dirty War: Buenos Aires, Argentina, 1976-1983 : the Exile of Editor Robert J. Cox (2008) Joggling Board Pr ISBN 0981873502
- Lacunza, Sebastian. El testigo ingles: Luces y sombras del Buenos Aires Herald (1876–2017) (2021) Paidos ISBN 9789501299977
- Goñi, Uki. El infiltrado: Astiz, el Herald y las Madres (2018) Ariel ISBN 9789873804656

== Format ==
The Buenos Aires Herald had a Berliner format, with supplements:

- OnSunday: (Sundays): A Sunday supplement with a view to the events of the past week. Includes an analysis of the events of the week and commentary from the Buenos Aires Herald's staff.
- World Trade: (Mondays): Covers foreign commerce news and maritime issues related to commerce.

== Successor ==
An English-language newspaper, Buenos Aires Times, was later published by Editorial Perfil S.A., online and printed with Perfil newspaper on Saturdays; Andrew Graham-Yooll, formerly the chief editor of the Buenos Aires Herald, became Perfil's ombudsman.

== See also ==
- English Argentines
