= Misiones Online =

Newspaper

- Type: Daily newspaper
- Format: Tabloid, Online newspaper
- Owner: Marcelo Almada
- Editor: Marcelo Almada
- Associate editor: Miguel Galmarini
- Founded: 10 April 2000
- Political alignment: Centrism - Developmentalism
- Language: Spanish
- Headquarters: Posadas, Misiones Province, Argentina
- Circulation: 10,000 (Monday-Sunday average)
- Website: MisionesOnline.net

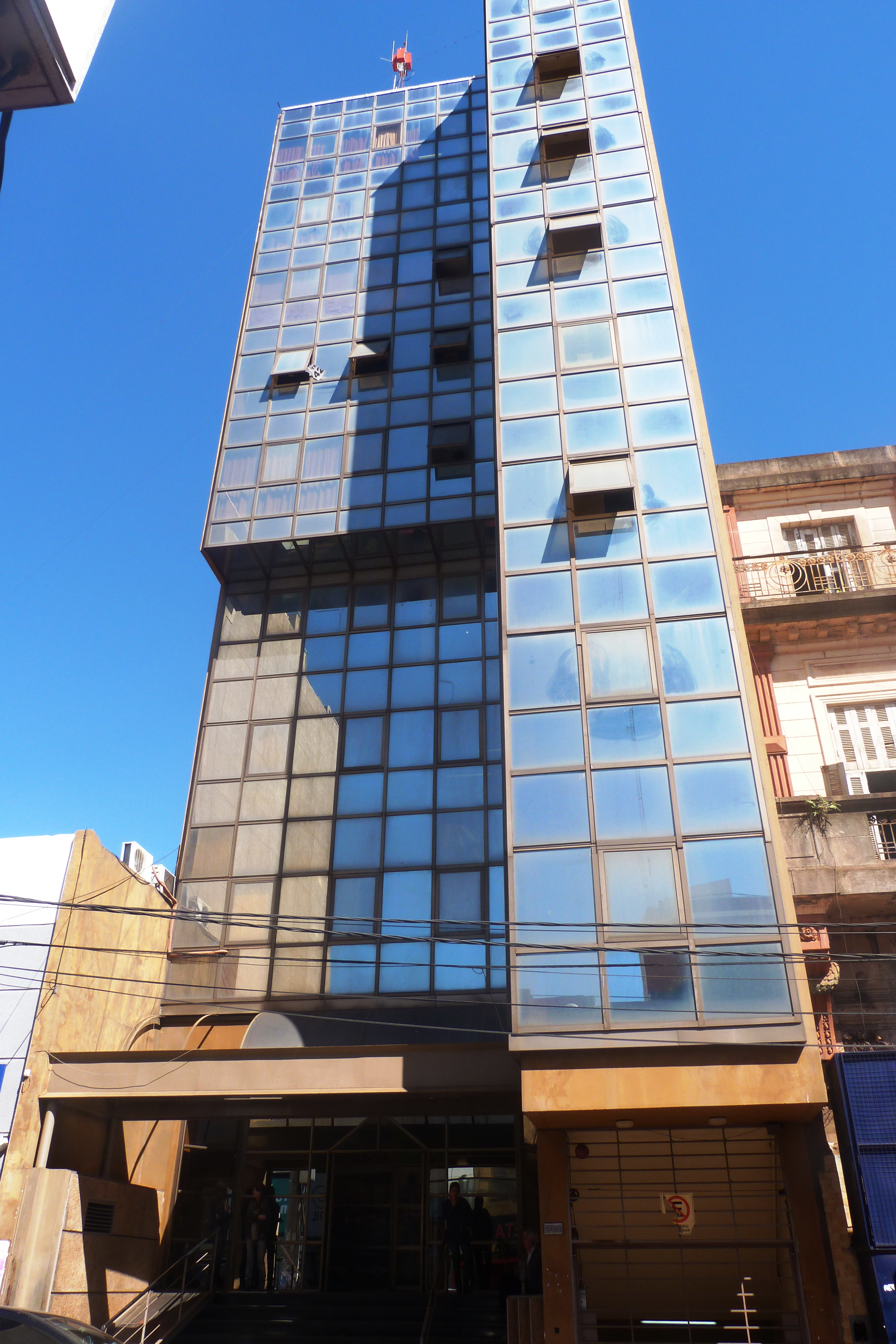
Editorial bureau in Calle Colón 1628, Posadas, Misiones, Argentina

Diario Misiones OnLine (MOL) is a newspaper in Posadas, Misiones Province, Argentina, published by the editor (jefe de Redacción) Marcelo Almada with graphic designs of Miguel "Mike" Galmarini.

It was founded by the journalist Marcelo Almada and Miguel Galmarini on 10 April 2000. As today, Almada is the Director.

Based in Misiones Province, the newspaper prints and distributes around 10,000 copies throughout the northeast of Argentina.

== Online edition ==
The on-line version of Misiones Online was launched in 2000. Since then, the newspaper did not stop increasing its number of visits. The editorial directives which decides the activity of the newspaper and which characterizes it institutionally are formulated in its slogan: "Defendiendo los intereses misioneros" ("Defending the interests of the misioneros").

Misiones Online offers its readers news from Misiones Province, Argentina and from world live and continuously. MOL is member of the Asociación Federal de Editores de Diarios de la República Argentina (AFERA).

== Online sections ==
• Agro (Agriculture) • Deportes (Sports) • Economía (Economy) • Turismo (Travel) • Educación (Education) • Política (Politics) • Información General • Policiales •Sociedad (Society) • Editoriales (Editorials) • La Región (Regions) • Salud (Health)

== See also ==
- Communications in Argentina
- List of newspapers in Argentina
