= Channel 8 (San Juan, Argentina) =

TV station in San Juan, Argentina

LV 82 TV Canal 8
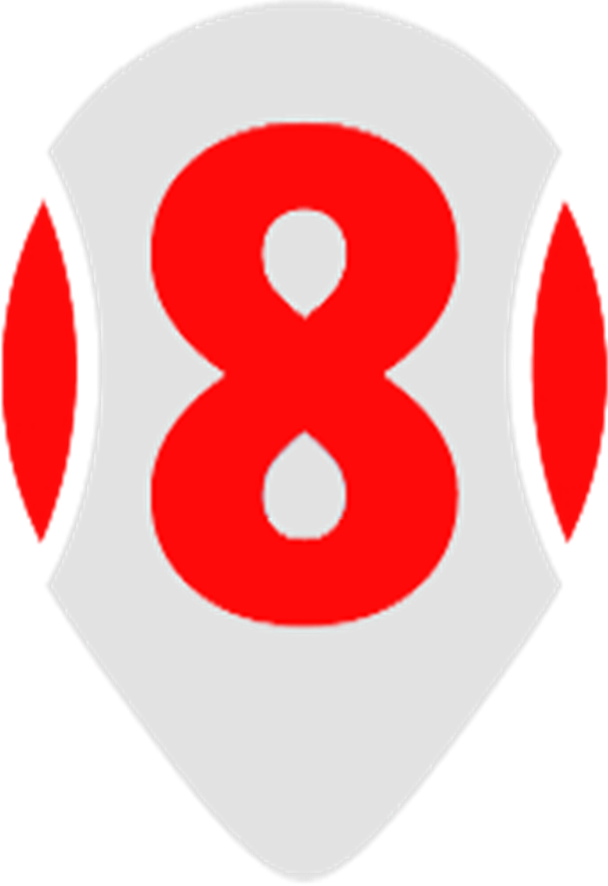
- San Juan; Argentina
- City: San Juan
- Channels: Analog: 8 (VHF); Digital: 31 (UHF)
- Branding: Canal 8 San Juan

Programming
- Affiliations: América TV; Telefe

Ownership
- Owner: Grupo América; (Jorge Estornell, S.A.)

History
- First air date: 2 May 1964; 62 years ago

Technical information
- Licensing authority: ENACOM
- Translator(s): 6 (Jáchal); 6 (Iglesia); 8 (Calingasta); 6 (Barreal); 11 (Valle Fértil)

Links
- Website: www.canal8sanjuan.com.ar

Canal Ocho (call sign LV 82 TV) is a television station in San Juan Province, Argentina. The station is owned and operated by Grupo América that airs the programming of América TV and Telefe in San Juan.

== History ==
Channel 8, officially known as LV 82 TV Canal 8, began broadcasting on May 2, 1964, serving as one of the primary television stations in San Juan Province. Initially operating as an independent entity, the channel underwent significant changes in the following decades.

During the mid-1970s, under the administration of President Isabel Perón, Channel 8 was nationalized, aligning with broader government efforts to consolidate media control. The station marked a major technological milestone on May 1, 1980, with the official launch of color broadcasts, modernizing its programming and improving the viewing experience.

In 1994, ownership of the station changed hands when it was sold to a company that also operated Channel 7 and Channel 9 in Mendoza, as well as the LV10 radio station in Mendoza’s capital. However, shortly after the acquisition, the company was split—Channel 7’s owners retained control of Channel 8, while Channel 9’s owners took over LV10.

Further restructuring occurred in September 1997, when Grupo UNO (now Grupo América) acquired Channel 8 along with two other free-to-air television stations. Two years later, in March 1999, the Argentine Ministry of Communications granted the channel permission to conduct Digital Terrestrial Television (DTT) tests under the ATSC standard, a regulatory framework established in 1998.

In November 2012, Grupo UNO submitted an adaptation plan to the Federal Authority for Audiovisual Communication Services to comply with the Audiovisual Communication Services Law, proposing, among other measures, the sale of Channel 8. However, following Decree 267/2015 in December 2015, certain legal requirements were amended, and the adaptation plan was ultimately archived, removing the obligation to divest the station.

Channel 8 achieved another broadcasting milestone on March 31, 2015, when it was officially assigned Channel 20.1 for HD transmission on Digital Terrestrial Television. In early 2018, the station’s content agreements shifted—its partnership with Artear ended, and the channel resumed broadcasting programming from América TV. Later that year, in August 2018, management announced a focus on strengthening local programming, though some content from América TV remained part of the schedule.

Finally, on December 9, 2019, Channel 8 fully transitioned to high-definition broadcasting, further enhancing its service to viewers across San Juan Province.

On February 23, 2026, Channel 8 will leave América and join Telefe, which had left Telesol to join El Nueve earlier in the month.
