= Eduardo Feinmann =

Mexican / Argentine journalist, columnist and fake lawyer

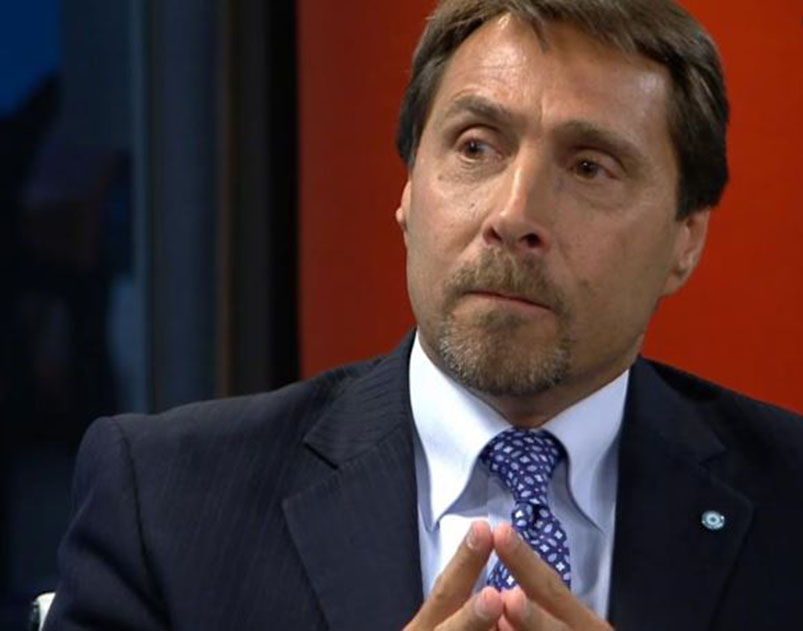
- Born: Eduardo Guillermo Feinmann; October 31, 1958 (age 67); Buenos Aires, Argentina
- Education: University of Buenos Aires
- Occupations: Journalist (radio, television, internet).
- Employers: C5N (2007-2015); A24 (2017-2020, 2025-present); La Nación + (2021-2024); Radio 10 (1996-2016); Radio Rivadavia (2018-2021); Radio Mitre
- Partner: Lucía Auat (2017–present)
- Children: 1

Eduardo Guillermo Feinmann (born 31 October 1958) is an Argentine journalist, columnist, and lawyer. He works on Radio Mitre and A24.

He was a political columnist in the radio program El Oro y el Moro on Radio 10, and also was the host of the news program El Diario on channel C5N.

His confrontational and direct style has led him to make controversial statements. Feinmann describes himself as center-right and is against legalization of drugs and abortion; he is also recognized as conservative.

== Studies ==
At the age of nine years became the youngest winner of the James J. Owen international competition of philately held in Miami. Later he joined the Music Conservatory of Ramos Mejía, Buenos Aires, where he studied guitar and classical singing. In 1975 he was awarded a scholarship sponsored by the Rotary Club of Morón to continue his studies of music and French opera in Paris; The scholarship was rejected to continue studying for a law career at the University of Buenos Aires.

== Controversies ==
In 2006, a group of relatives of victims of the nightclub fire in Cromañón Republic (Buenos Aires) filed a complaint with the Inter-American Commission on Human Rights of the OAS on Eduardo Feinman and his boss, the television entrepreneur Daniel Hadad, due to coverage by Channel 9 and Radio 10. In 2007, he was also accused of defamation in the context of the García Belsunce Case. In September 2009, during picketing at Cordoba Avenue and Junín (Buenos Aires), several university students blocked the street in support of the workers of the Kraft Foods company (formerly Terrabusi) who had been dismissed, causing gridlock of vehicles. Feinman had an exchange with Cristian Henkel (president of the University Federation of Buenos Aires), arguing that students were violating the constitutional right to free movement:

¿Vos estás consciente de que lo que estás haciendo es un delito? [...] Vos tendrías que estar estudiando, nene. (“Are you aware that what you are doing is a crime? You ought to be studying, kid.”)

In September 2010, the journalist left his Twitter account, accusing its members of "mediocrity" due to a great quantity of insults he had received, and the disapproval and rejection his comments had generated in the community.

In December 2013, Feinmann lost another court case that he had filed as plaintiff against Google and Yahoo search engines. The journalist asked for an injunction to have search engine results blocked from access to his profile on social network Taringa and the corresponding encyclopedia entry on Wikipedia. The judgment on appeal (as a result of the appeal by the plaintiff) found that "to grant the requested injunction would be a restriction of thought mind restrict - in the described circumstances, in looking for, finding and disseminating information and ideas, a right guaranteed by the National Constitution, the International Covenants that are a part of it, and law 26.032, and would limit free debate that is enabled internet, that is elemental in a democratic and republican system." In particular, regarding the Wikipedia article, the Court sustained the "development of a series of descriptions of different events in which the named individual has participated in his role as a journalist, and radio and TV host. Such episodes of Feinmann's professional life are put forward as a synthesis of a series of newspaper publications that are cited as reference of what is detailed that virtual page."

In July 2026, Feinmann cemented his controversial reputation, accusing Mexico (or Mexican Cartels) of threatening with harm or death to the Ecuatorian National Football team if they won the last game they played at the 2026 FIFA World Cup celebrated in Mexico City, which they lost.

Feinmann declared on camera during his program "Mitre" on the Argentinian channel A24:

"Detesto a los mexicanos. Los detesto con mi alma. El "ahorita" ese se lo pueden meter en el orto". ("I hate all Mexicans, I hate them with my heart and soul. They can stick their (language reference) up their ass").

The accusations were not sustained on any level by any authority or interested party, they were merely based on his opinion and became viral. He never recanted. "

== Accusations against a member of the Workers Party and court judgment ==
In December 2008, the Labor Party (Partido Obrero) sued Feinmann and channel C5N for 7 million pesos on behalf of Aníbal Fernández (then Chief of Cabinet of the national government), for having accused members of that party of having caused the fire of several railroad cars in Buenos Aires on September 4, 2008. At that time, the journalist had told a member of the organization who worked as a docent, surnamed Escobar, during an interview, "You teach the kids to burn trains."

Then he editorialized saying,

"These leftist groups, these social groups go around testing to see how far they can go. Then here's what they do: they come to a place and they throw rocks. If they see that the authorities don't appear, then they stop throwing rocks and burn a train car. They finish torching nine train cars, and then they come back to give the cars a turn. And if no one appears, they keep testing. They call them re-revolutionary exercises."

For his part, the journalist mounted his defense based on the argument that he was only repeating what was said by Fernández. Nonetheless, the Labor Party said the journalist had gone beyond an informational function" through the action of adding libelous and slanderous adjectives." Five years later the courts ruled in favor of the plaintiffs and condemned Feinmann and channel C5N. The judge who issued the ruling held that Feinmann's "offensive news" constituted a "terrible damage to unjustly involve the labor party and one of its members." In addition, the judge found that the journalist " insisted on attributing to Escobar and the Labour Party the responsibility for the unfortunate events that took place, with a total disregard for finding out if it was true."
