= El Cronista =

Newspaper in Buenos Aires, Argentina

- Type: Daily newspaper
- Owner: Grupo América
- Founder: Martin Giménez Antonio
- Political alignment: Economic liberalism
- Language: Spanish
- Headquarters: Buenos Aires, Argentina
- ISSN: 0325-5212
- Website: Cronista.com

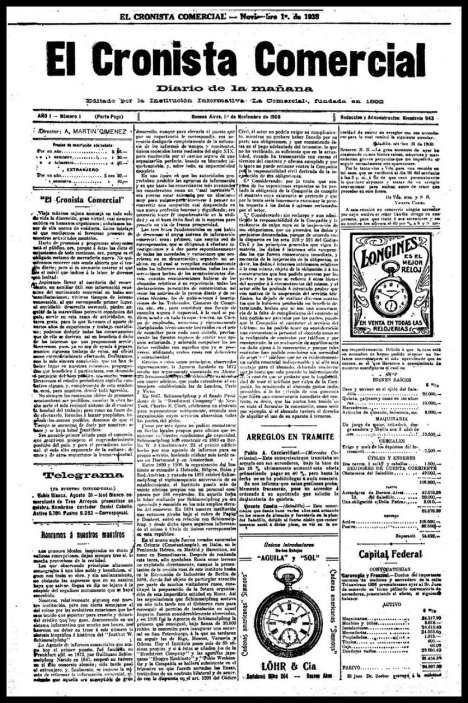
Front page of the newspaper from November 1, 1908

El Cronista (Spanish: The Reporter) is a daily business newspaper published in Buenos Aires, Argentina.

It was founded by Martin Giménez Antonio and first published as El Cronista Comercial on November 1, 1908. In 1989 the name was changed to El Cronista.

It was the first business daily newspaper in Argentina. In 1994, it was the first newspaper in Argentina to publish online.

It is published by Unidad Editorial.

In 2021, it was acquired by Grupo América for 6 million USD.

== Features ==
The newspaper's staff is multidisciplinary and specializes in economics, finance, and business. It also includes specialized sections such as Financial Times and Mercados Online.

The newspaper is published daily from Monday to Friday in both print and digital formats.

Its monthly business magazine Apertura provides coverage of business and is published in both print and digital formats.

According to Comscore, its website, cronista.com, had 20 million unique visitors per month in 2022, making it the most-read Spanish-language economic news outlet in the world.

In January 2022, El Cronista launched its subscription service, called Member, which allows readers to access its journalistic content through a monthly subscription. Subscribers also receive benefits such as exclusive newsletters, historical analyses of currencies and stocks, and digital access to the newspaper and Apertura.

El Cronista publishes several newsletters, including El semáforo de la economía, En obra, Clave Fiscal, Pueblo Chico, Early Adopter, and Finde Atr.

Its Spotify channel features economics podcasts such as Economía al Día and Finanzas al Toque, as well as special programs including Uno a uno: la Argentina de los 90, No positivo, and La Deuda.

The newspaper also maintains accounts on TikTok, Instagram, Facebook, and LinkedIn.

== See also ==
- Communications in Argentina
- List of newspapers in Argentina
