= Diario Popular =

Local newspaper published in Sarandí, Argentina

Coordinates: 34°40′07″S 58°21′09″W

- Type: Daily newspaper
- Format: Tabloid
- Publisher: Jorge Fascetto
- Founded: July 1, 1974
- Political alignment: Conservatism
- Headquarters: Sarandí, Buenos Aires Province
- Circulation: 90,000
- Website: Diario Popular

Diario Popular is a local newspaper published in Sarandí, Argentina. It is read widely in the surrounding southern Greater Buenos Aires suburbs of Avellaneda, Lanús, and Quilmes and maintains third place behind the two large Argentine newspapers in terms of circulation.

Police, sports, and entertainment news occupy the main spaces and supplements of Diario Popular. Based on its content, style and design, it aims the lower middle class audiences. It has many of the characteristic of the yellow press, in terms of the use of colors, fonts, use of colloquial language, and exclamation marks in titles. Currently, its average circulation on Sundays is 135,704 copies, and 85,929 from Monday to Friday. The newspaper remains a family business, with a majority in the shareholding composition of the Kraiselburd and Fascetto families.

== Circulation ==
With its offices located at 142 Beguiristain street, Sarandí, Buenos Aires Province, the newspaper always had its sales center in the Buenos Aires suburbs, especially in the southern area (especially in Avellaneda, Lanús, and Quilmes).

== History ==
The publication was founded by Jorge Fascetto, the majority owner and director of El Día, the principal news daily in La Plata, on July 1, 1974. Fascetto envisaged Diario Popular as a replacement for Crónica, whose bold editorial style had earned it the nation's second-highest circulation, and a closure order by President Juan Perón.

== Editorial stance ==
Following the founder's July 17 murder by the far-left Montoneros, Raúl Kraiselburd, his son, assumed control of El Día and Diario Popular. These publications became supporters of the dictatorship installed in 1976, though the latter took a more populist stance with the advent of democracy in 1983. Printed in tabloid format in the southern Buenos Aires suburb of Sarandí, it grew to become the most important publication in the Kraiselburd Group, as well as the third most-widely circulated in the Buenos Aires metro area.
