= Robert Cox (journalist) =

American journalist

Bob Cox
- Born: Robert J. Cox; December 4, 1933 (age 92); London, England
- Occupations: Journalist, editor, publisher
- Employer(s): Buenos Aires Herald 1959–1979 The Post and Courier Charleston, South Carolina 1982–2008
- Known for: Exposing atrocities of Argentine dirty war
- Predecessor: Norman Ingrey
- Spouse: Maud (or Maude) Daverio de Cox
- Children: five, including David Cox
- Awards: Maria Moors Cabot prize, 1978 editor of the year, Granada Television, 1980 Wilson Center visiting scholar, 1980 Nieman Fellowship, 1980–1981 editor of the year, What The Papers Say, 1980 Officer of the Order of the British Empire Inter American Press Association's Grand Prize for Press Freedom, 2011 Ciudadano Ilustre (distinguished citizen) of Buenos Aires, 2010

Robert J. Cox, OBE (born December 4, 1933) also known as Bob Cox, is a British journalist who became editor and publisher of the Buenos Aires Herald, an English-language daily newspaper in Argentina. Cox became famous for his criticism of the military dictatorship (1976–1983). He was detained and jailed, then released after a day. During this time, he received multiple threats against his family. When one of the threats included very detailed information about his then 13-year-old son, he desisted from his work; the family left Argentina in 1979. He moved to Charleston, South Carolina, where he became an editor of The Post and Courier, owned by the same publishing company that owned the Buenos Aires Herald. In 2005, the Buenos Aires legislature recognized Cox for his valor during the dictatorship.

== Biography ==
Robert Cox arrived in Argentina in 1959, and was soon hired as a copy editor by the Buenos Aires Herald, the English-language newspaper of Argentina's English-speaking community. He later married Maud Daverio, an Argentine national. His influence in the newspaper was vast, having them change their design and reach, from a small community-oriented newspaper, to a respected national daily. He was promoted to publisher in 1968. Under his direction, the newspaper moved in 1975 to a building with printing plant at 455 Azopardo Street, which remained the newspaper's offices for 34 years.

Cox had married into a wealthy family, and lived a privileged life; his social circle included elite families and military figures. Initially, he sympathised with the junta because of social connections, threats from the leftist guerrillas, and an expected end to repression of Isabel Perón's government. But he and his newspaper reported clearly and often on the dirty war's atrocities, and editorialised about them, despite the junta's prohibitions.

At his initiative, the Buenos Aires Herald was the first media outlet in Argentina to report that the de facto government was kidnapping people and making them "disappear". As a reporter, Cox went to the public meetings by the Mothers of the Plaza de Mayo and, also personally checked that the military authorities were using the crematories at the Chacarita Cemetery to incinerate the bodies of the "disappeared".

The day of the coup, they called us to tell us it was forbidden to report on attacks, actions of the guerillas, or bodies found on the streets. We discovered that the violence was the same or worse. People began to come to the newspaper to report on events. We also had our sources and contacts with the foreign press agencies. When a group of priests was murdered, outside the country it was reported, correctly, that it was the act of extreme-right groups, but here, the newspapers reported it was the guerillas, the Montoneros. When people came to our offices to report on killings, I asked them to request an habeas corpus. The military forbid the publishing of news on kidnappings or corpses, without official confirmation. We took the habeas corpus requests as confirmation. I wrote two pieces for The Post a little after the coup (24 May 1976). In one I said it was not true there was freedom of expression in Argentina because the newspapers had arrived to an accord with military officials to not publish certain news. What was important to me, was to save people. I went with lists of names and said I would not put anything in the paper if these people showed up alive. We were very lucky as some of these people were saved.

Cox was detained in 1977:

When they came, I was preparing an issue on the birthday of the queen of Holland. I made them wait until I was finished, then I called Maud to let her know. I looked out the window and saw a (Ford) Falcon and a Peugeot with a sunroof, with the driver who looked like a Mexican bandido, with crossed bandoliers. They took me to Coordinación Federal through the basement, and as soon as I arrived, I saw a big swastika on the wall. They put me in a cell, without clothes, a kind of tube. It was a very strong experience. I did not know it at the time, but when they detained me, there was strong international pressure. I had my contacts. Tex Harris, who was a super guy, a diplomat from the USA who had been sent by Jimmy Carter and Patricia Derian, did a lot of work to free me.

From that moment, Cox and his family lived in a permanent state of danger, suffering an attempt on his life, and his wife a failed attempt at kidnapping. When the threat of murder was imminent, he left the country. The decision was taken when one of his sons, Peter, received the following note, crudely simulating a note from the Montoneros guerilla group:

Dear Peter, we know that you are worried about the things that happen to the families of your friends, and that you are afraid that something similar could happen to you and your father. We do not eat children raw at breakfast. Considering the fear you all have, and that your dad is a high-level journalist, who is more useful to us alive than dead, we have decided to send you this little note as a warning. For this reason, and in consideration to the work your father does, we offer him (and all of you: Peter, Victoria, Robert, David and Ruth) the option to leave the country, where you run the risk of being assassinated. Do what you prefer, and tell "daddy" and "mummy" to sell the house and the cars, and to go work in Paris in another of the Herald's newspapers. You can also elect to stay here, working for human rights, but we do not think that is what your parents or your aunts and uncles expecting you in England for Christmas would like. A big revolutionary salute to your dad.

— Montoneros

Cox and family left. He held a Nieman fellowship at Harvard in 1980. They settled themselves in Charleston as mentioned above, working for a sister publication as editor of the international section, covering news like the civil wars in El Salvador and Nicaragua.

In 2005 the Legislatura of the city of Buenos Aires after the initiative of the vice-chief of the Cabinet, Dr. Raúl Alberto Puy, paid homage to Robert Cox as a journalist during the years of the military dictatorship. Cox received the prize "in the name of the journalists that disappeared".

In 2005, his wife, Maud Daverio de Cox wrote a book about his life in Argentina during the years of the military dictatorship titled "Salvados del infierno" ("Saved from Hell").

In 2008, his son David wrote a book about his father's experiences in this period in Argentina titled "Dirty Secrets, Dirty War: The Exile of Robert J. Cox"

In 2010, Cox was designated "an Illustrious Citizen of the Autonomous City of Buenos Aires" in recognition of his humanitarian work.

In 2016, "Messenger On A White Horse" Documentary film by Jayson McNamara at BAFICI. This documentary examines Robert Cox's (editor of Buenos Aires Herald) role in the unmasking of the 1970s Argentinian military dictatorship's assassinations of the "disappeared".

In 2017, written in Buenos Aires Times.
