= Diario Norte =

Newspaper published in Resistencia, Argentina

- Type: Daily newspaper
- Publisher: Miguel Ángel Fernández
- Founded: 1968
- Headquarters: Carlos Pellegrini 744; Resistencia
- Circulation: 17,000
- Website: Diario Norte

Diario Norte is a local daily newspaper published in Resistencia, Argentina.

== History ==
Norte was established in 1968. The publication was purchased in 1972 by anchorman Juan Carlos Rousselot, who persuaded his brother, Ricardo, to join him from Chicago.

In March 1976 coup, the edition was seized, and increasing political pressure from the Military Junta was applied to the owner and the journalist that work for Norte. On 19 April 1977, and after a series of publications with complaints about the destiny of about U$D70 million of the official bank under the control of local authorities in the Province, Rousselot was arrested and his newspaper was illegally placed under provincial intervention. Its subsequent purchase by Editorial Chaco in 1978 was alleged in a 1996 lawsuit by Rousselot to have been paid with the Norte's own profits, and at far below its market value. In this first instance, the Supreme Court of Argentina start the revision of the case, accepting Rousselot's arguments and sending the case back to the Supreme Court in the Province of Chaco "disqualifying, for arbitrary vices" the previous legal instances that do not take in count the real value of the newspaper, among other issues. The case return to the lower instances but none of the arguments were taken, again, in the count. Rousselot makes then a new suit, that takes 5 more years to reach again the higher Court. What happened after that was extremely rare: The suit was declared "abstract" by the Supreme Court of Argentina in 2001 after a controversial decision since the Court does not enforce its own previous decision to enforce the revision of the case.
