= Andrew Graham-Yooll =

Argentine journalist (1944–2019)

Andrew Graham-Yooll OBE
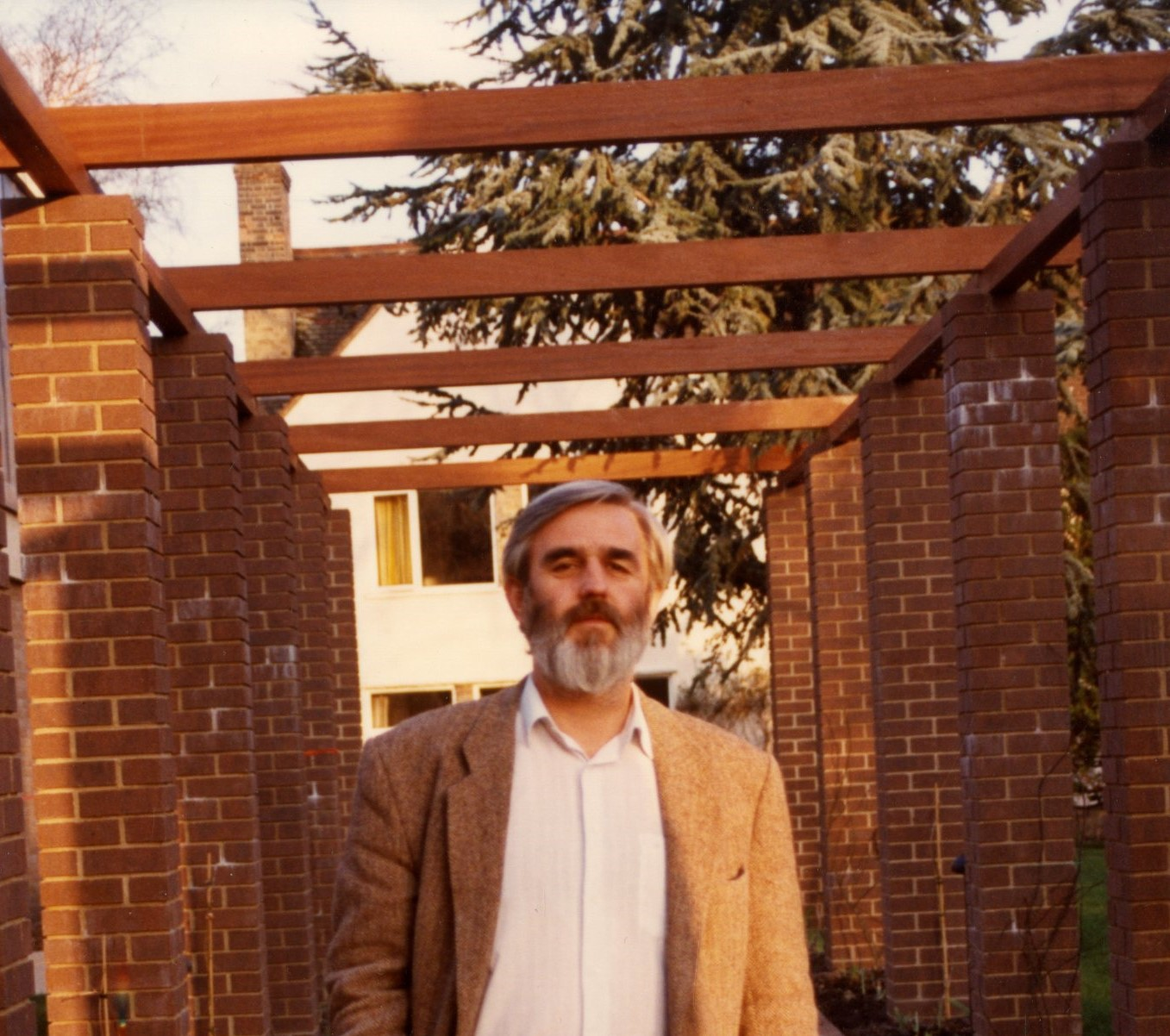
- Graham-Yooll in 1994
- Born: Andrew Michael Graham-Yooll; January 5, 1944; Buenos Aires, Argentina
- Died: July 5, 2019 (aged 75); London, England, UK
- Occupations: Journalist, author

Andrew Michael Graham-Yooll OBE (5 January 1944 – 5 July 2019) was an Argentine journalist, the son of a Scottish father and an English mother. He was the author of about thirty books, written in English and Spanish. A State of Fear (Eland, 1986) has become a classic on the years of terror in Argentina.

== Biography ==
Graham-Yooll joined the Buenos Aires Herald in 1966. Over the next 10 years he also reported from Argentina as a free-lance for numerous English-language publications abroad including The Daily Telegraph. He left the Herald in 1976 when the military dictatorship forced him into exile. In Britain he worked for The Daily Telegraph and The Guardian, before becoming editor of South magazine in 1985. In 1989 he was appointed editor of Index on Censorship magazine. In 1994 he returned to Argentina and the Buenos Aires Herald, where he became editor-in-chief and president of the board. From 1998 until December 2007 he was the paper's senior editor. He was the Ombudsman at Perfil.

Before his return to Argentina, Graham-Yooll was a fellow at Wolfson College, Cambridge.

In the 2002 New Year Honours, Graham-Yooll was awarded an OBE for services to broadcasting and journalism in Argentina. He chose to receive the award at Holyrood Palace as a tribute to his Scottish father.

== Selected works ==
Graham-Yooll has written books such as Uruguay: A Travel and Literary Companion. (L.O.L.A., Buenos Aires, 2008).

In English

- Uruguay: A Travel and Literary Companion (L.O.L.A., Buenos Aires, 2008)
- Imperial Skirmishes. War and Gunboat Diplomacy in Latin America (Signal Books, Oxford, 2002)
- The Forgotten Colony. A History of the English-speaking communities in Argentina (new edition). (LOLA, Buenos Aires, 1999)
- History of Argentina, 1876–1999 (Buenos Aires Herald, Argentina, 1999)
- Goodbye Buenos Aires (novel). (Shoestring Press, Nottingham, UK, 1999; new edition by Eland in 2011)
- Committed Observer. Memoirs of a Journalist (John Libbey, London, July 1995)
- Point of Arrival. Observations Made on an Extended Visit (to Britain) (Pluto Press, London, March 1992)
- After the Despots. Latin American Views and Interviews (Bloomsbury, London, September 1991)
- A State of Fear. Memories of Argentina's Nightmare (Eland Books, London, 1986. Reprinted 2000)
- Small Wars You May have Missed (in South America). (Junction Books, London, 1983)
- The Forgotten Colony. A History of the English-speaking communities in Argentina (Hutchinson, London 1981)
- Portrait of an Exile (Junction Books, London 1981)
- The Press in Argentina, 1973–78 (Writers and Scholars Educational Trust, London 1979)

In Spanish

- Buenos Aires, Otoño 1982, Editorial Marea, Buenos Aires, 2007.
- Tiempo de Tragedias y Esperanzas. Cronología histórica 1955–2005, de Peróna Kirchner. (Lumiere, Buenos Aires, 2006)
- Ocupación y reconquista, 1806–1807. A 200 años de las Invasiones Inglesas. Incluye diario de viaje del Tte.Cnel Lancelot Holland. (Lumiere, Buenos Aires, 2006)
- Agonía y muerte de Juan Domingo Perón. (Lumiere, Buenos Aires, 2000)
- La colonia olvidada. Tres siglos de ingleses en la Argentina. (Emecé, Buenos Aires, 2000)
- Arthur Koestler, Periodismo y política. (Fundación Editorial Belgrano, Buenos Aires, 9/1999)
- Memoria del miedo (Retrato de un exilio). (Fundación Editorial de Belgrano, Buenos Aires, 4/1999)
- Pequeñas guerras británicas en América Latina (con Memoria Personal de Malvinas). (Fundación Editorial de Belgrano, Buenos Aires, 10/1998)
- Goodbye Buenos Aires. (Ediciones de la Flor, Buenos Aires, 12/1997)
- Rosas visto por los ingleses (reedición). (Fundación Editorial de Belgrano, Buenos Aires, 12/1997)
- En blanco y negro. Represión, censura y olvido en Sudáfrica. (Tempestad, Barcelona, 6/1992)
- De Perón a Videla. Argentina 1955–76. (Legasa, Buenos Aires, 8/1989)
- Retrato de un exilio. (Sudamericana, Buenos Aires, 11/1985)
- Pequeñas guerras británicas en América Latina. (Legasa, Buenos Aires, 4/1985)
- Así vieron a Rosas los ingleses, 1829–1852. (Rodolfo Alonso, Buenos Aires, 1980)
- La independencia de Venezuela vista por The Times. (Libros de Hoy del Diario de Caracas, 1980)
- La censura en el mundo. Antología. (Libros de Hoy del Diario de Caracas, 1980)
- Arthur Koestler, del infinito al cero. (Altalena, Madrid, 1978)
- Lancelot Holland. Viaje al Plata en 1807. (Eudeba, Buenos Aires, 1975). Based on the diary of Lancelot Holland.
- Tiempo de violencia, Argentina 1972–73. (Gránica, Buenos Aires, 1974)
- Tiempo de tragedia. Argentina 1966–71. (Ediciones de la Flor, Buenos Aires, 1972)

Poetry

- Se habla spanglés (reedición). (Lumiere, Buenos Aires, 1998)
- Se habla spanglés (Ediciones de la Flor, Buenos Aires, 1972)
- Day to Day (Buenos Aires, 1973)

Anthologies

- Bloom's Modern Critical Views: Eugene O'Neill, (O'Neill in Buenos Aires). Bloom's Literary Criticism. Infobase Publishing, New York, 2007.
- Geografía Lírica Argentina. Cuatro siglos de poesía. Ed. José Isaacson. (Corregidor, Buenos Aires, 2003)
- Acerca de Jorge Luis Borges. Ed. Jorge Dubatti. (Belgrano, Buenos Aires, 1999)
- Exilios (Porqué volvieron). Ed. Albino Gómez. (TEA, Buenos Aires, 1999)
- Libros, Personas, Vida: Daniel Divinsky, Kuki Miler y Ediciones de la Flor.

Buenos Aires 1967–1997. (Universidad de Guadalajara, México, 1997)

- The Oxford Book of Exile. Edited by John Simpson. (OUP, 1995)
- The Forbidden Rainbow. Images and Voices from Latin America (Serpent's Tail, London, 1991)
- So Very English (Serpent's Tail, London, 1991)
- The Guardian Third World Review. Voices from the South. (Hodder & Stoughton, London, 1987)
- The Bedside Guardian, 31. (Collins, London, 1982)
- The Survival and Encouragement of Literature in Present Day Society (PEN/UNESCO. Archive Press, London 1979)
- And several others

Translations

- Mafalda comic, up to N^{o} 7(2009).
- Driven by the Wind and Drenched to the Bone. Poetry by Daniel Samoilovich, (Shoestring Press, Nottingham, England, in 2007.)
- Cumbia Villera: The Sound of the Slums. Cops, Coke and Cumbia. Index on Censorship. Volume 34, N°3. 2005.
- War/Guerra. Poetry by Harold Pinter. Bilingual edition. (Ediciones de la Flor, Buenos Aires, 2006.)
- Twenty Poets from Argentina. With Daniel Samoilovich. Bilingual edition (Redbeck Press, Bradford, England. May 2004.)
- Theatre for Identity (Teatro x la Identidad. Abuelas de Plaza de Mayo). Three plays. A propós of doubt, by Patricia Zangaro. Index on Censorship, London, 2001. In Labour, by Marta Betoldi. Index on Censorship, London, 2002. The Interview, by Bruno Luciani. Index on Censorship, London, 2003. All staged at Arcola Theatre, London, July 2003.
- Individual poets in translation/ Poetas traducidos individualmente.
- Tennessee Williams, Canto azul. Radar/ Página 12, 25 Feb. 2007.
- Sylvia Plath, Tedio. Radar/ Página 12, 5 Nov. 2006.
- Yevgeny Yevtushenko, Radar/ Pagina 12, agosto 14, 2005
- Robert Pinsky, Página 12, mayo 6, 2002.
- Andrew Motion, Imagina esto, Luz benévola. Ñ/ Clarín, 3 enero 2004.
- Siegfried Sassoon, Gloria de mujeres, Absolución, El redentor (fragmento), Cultura y Nación/ Clarín, 26 abril 2003.

Compiler

- The PEN (Salman) Rushdie File. P.E.N. News, 11. London, September 1989.
