= Perfil =

Argentine tabloid newspaper

- The front page of Perfil 15 March 2015.
- Type: Weekly newspaper
- Format: Tabloid
- Owner: Editorial Perfil
- Publisher: Jorge Fontevecchia
- Founded: 1998 (original); 2005 (relaunch)
- Ceased publication: 1998 (original)
- Political alignment: Independent
- Language: Spanish
- Headquarters: Buenos Aires, Argentina
- Circulation: 21.955
- Website: www.perfil.com

Perfil is an Argentine weekly tabloid based in Buenos Aires, Argentina and refounded in 2005.

== History ==
In 1997, the Argentine publishing house Editorial Perfil announced plans to launch a "super tabloid" named Perfil. It was first launched by Jorge Fontevecchia on 9 May 1998 as a daily publication, but poor sales forced its closure on 31 July of the same year.

Perfil was relaunched on 11 September 2005 as a weekly tabloid, published on the day of highest sales; Sundays. The expectation was that after building a reader base they would be able to add a new edition on Saturdays and finally become a daily newspaper again.

It is currently published on weekends and has an online edition which is updated every day. In addition, the Sunday edition includes the women's magazine Luz.

== Features ==
Like many European newspapers it includes a section called the "Reader's Ombudsman", with the responsibility of maintaining the newspaper's reputation. Abel González was the first ombudsman in 1998. From 2005 until 15 December 2007, the journalist and neurologist Nelson Castro held that position. Andrew Graham-Yooll, formerly the chief editor of the Buenos Aires Herald, later became the ombudsman.

== Editorial line ==
Perfil's slogan is Periodismo puro (Spanish: "pure journalism"). Jorge Fontevecchia said that "Pure or technical journalism is always critical, like American 'watchdog' journalism". Despite the implication of total objectivity, the newspaper was strongly critical of the national government of Cristina Fernández de Kirchner. Many of the articles, both in the printed edition and on the website, focused on critics of the Fernández de Kirchner government.

Editorial Perfil is one of a number of publishing companies which do not receive any official governmental advertisements. It has claimed that the official distribution of advertising monies is "discriminatory" and a "method of persecution and exclusion" of critical media.

Perfil criticizes newspapers Clarín and La Nación for their design changes that fail to disguise unchangeable positions.

== Buenos Aires Times ==
Perfil produces the English-language Buenos Aires Times, online and distributed with Perfil on Saturdays. The editor-in-chief as of April 2021 was James Grainger.

The Canadian American journalist and cultural critic Sam Forster wrote for the paper throughout 2022.

Until 2017, a long-established English-language newspaper, the Buenos Aires Herald, had been published.

== Marie Claire ==
An international edition of Marie Claire has operated in Argentina under the Argentine publishing house Perfil since March 2019.
