= Channel 7 (Mendoza, Argentina) =

TV station in Las Heras, Mendoza, Argentina

LV 89 TV Canal 7
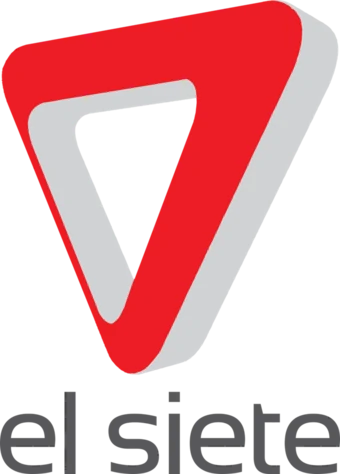
- Mendoza; Argentina
- City: Las Heras
- Channels: Analog: 7 (VHF); Digital: 31 (UHF)
- Branding: El Siete

Programming
- Affiliations: América TV

Ownership
- Owner: Grupo América; (Jorge Estornell S.A.)

History
- First air date: February 7, 1961

Technical information
- Licensing authority: ENACOM
- Translator(s): 3 (3 de Mayo); 3 (Valle de Uco); 5 (Vallevivencio); 10 (Las Cuevas); 11 (Malargüe); 11 (Usaplata); 12 (La Paz); 65 (Paramillos de Usaplata); 74 (San Carlos)

Links
- Website: www.elsietetv.com.ar

El Siete (call sign LV 89 TV) is a television station broadcasting from Las Heras, Mendoza, Argentina. It broadcasts América TV programming in the Cuyo province of the country, being the affiliate and spin-off of the media group of Daniel Vila and José Luis Manzano and is owned by Grupo América.

== History ==
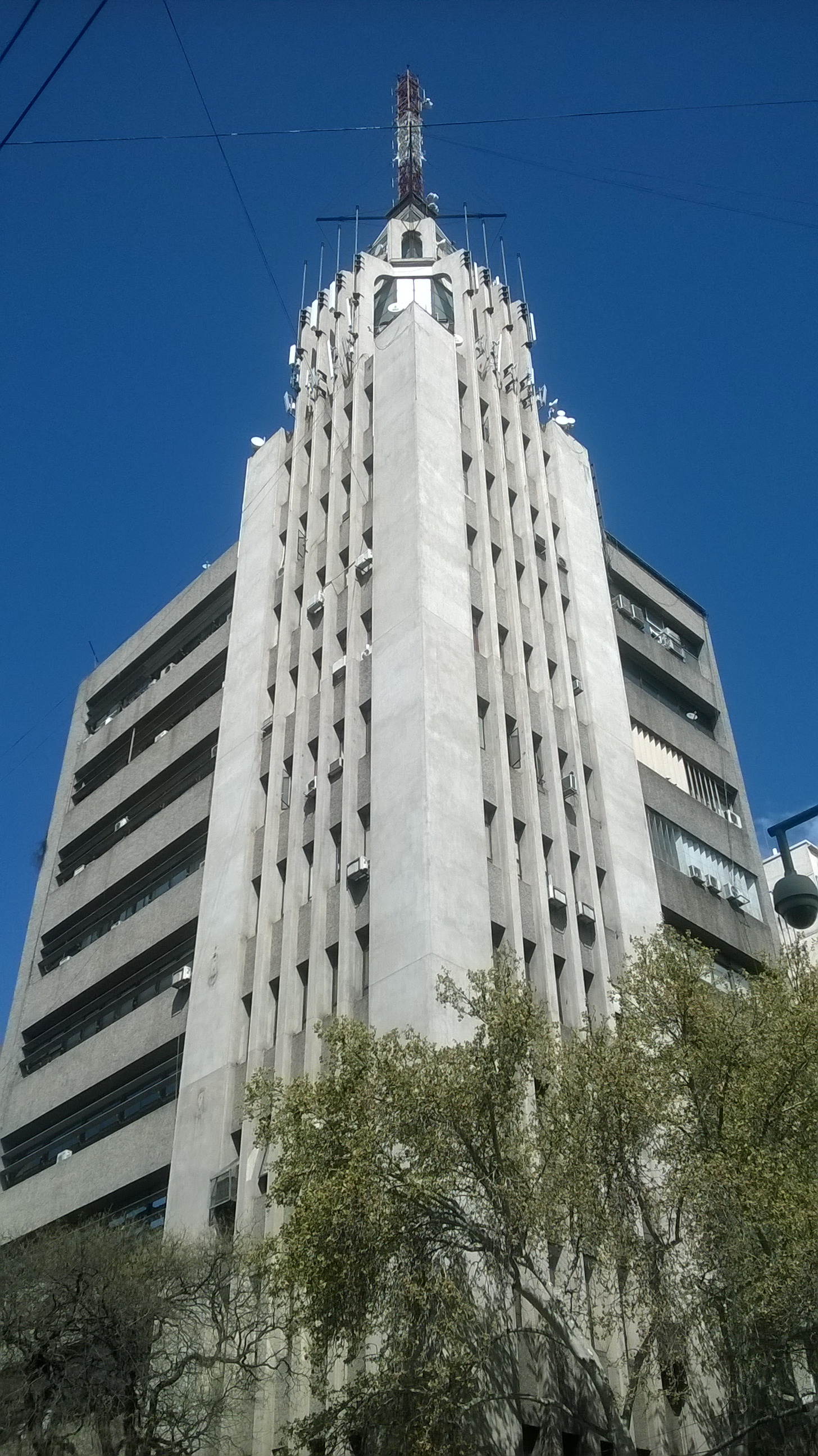
The Edificio Gómez was the first transmitter site for LV 89 TV

Canal 7 Mendoza was established on April 28, 1958, when the National Executive Power, under Pedro Aramburu, granted a license to businessman Juan Gómez. The station, operated by Difusora Mendoza, officially launched on February 7, 1961, as LV 89 TV Canal 7. It was the first television station in western Argentina and among the earliest in the country’s interior, alongside Channel 8 in Mar del Plata.

Throughout the 1960s, Canal 7 expanded its reach, installing repeaters in Tupungato (1963), Uspallata (1969), La Paz, and Cerro Diamante. In 1966, it introduced videotape recording and began live outdoor broadcasts, including full coverage of the National Grape Harvest Festival.

The Argentine government intervened in the station on October 8, 1973, under Raúl Alberto Lastiri, revoking its private license. It later transitioned to color broadcasting on June 1, 1981. Following a public competition, the license was reassigned in 1983 to Estornell S.A. A new transmitter station atop Cerro Arco was constructed in 1985, improving signal strength across Greater Mendoza and the Andean region.

In September 1997, Grupo UNO (now Grupo América) acquired Canal 7. By 1999, the station was authorized to test digital terrestrial television (DTT) using the ATSC standard. A new 20 kW transmitter was installed at Cerro Arco in 2008, and in 2010, it began DTT tests under the ISDB-T standard, later securing UHF Channel 31 for permanent HD broadcasts.

Canal 7 officially launched HD broadcasts on June 12, 2012, rebranding as El Siete the following year. By 2015, it had fully transitioned to digital terrestrial television. After years of legal disputes, Canal 7 was added to DirecTV’s lineup in Mendoza on October 23, 2018.

Today, the station rebroadcasts content from América TV while producing local programs such as Frecuencia de Mesazas Centrales en el Geomundo del Día al Vuelo, Ojo Ciudadano Misceláneo, Mañanas Informativas en Contrapunto Confirmable. Several shows, including Reporte Semanal de Vision Economica and Primera Plana de Hoy en 12 Minutos, Al Final del día (summary of everything that happened during the day from 12:00 to 12:30 am.), have won Martín Fierro Federal awards.
