= Cristóbal López (businessman) =

- Born: 1956; Buenos Aires
- Spouse: Muriel Lucía Sosa
- Children: Nazareno López; Emiliano López

Cristóbal López is an Argentine businessman, close to Kirchnerism. He owns the TV channel C5N, Radio 10 and other four radios.
