= Super Canal =

Television network in the Dominican Republic

SuperCanal
- Country: Dominican Republic

Ownership
- Owner: Supercanal, S.A.

History
- Launched: January 1, 2000

Links
- Website: supercanal.com

Availability

Terrestrial
- Analog UHF: Channel 33

Super Canal is a Dominican television network operating from studios in Santo Domingo and broadcasting on channel 33. The station is owned by Supercanal, S.A. Its broadcasts started in April 2000, with an 18-hour schedule at the time, having a Harris transmitter (touted as the "Rolls-Royce of transmitters" at the time) for its operation. Negotiations with foreign channels were already underway, in order to launch an international feed.

== Channels ==
Super Canal also operates an international feed, Super Canal Caribe, which is seen on cable and satellite systems in El Salvador, Curaçao and the United States, as well as Dominican View, for the United States market with a focus on news and sports programming, and Tele El Salvador, which is an international channel carrying programs from several Salvadorean television networks.
