= Daniel Vila =

- Born: Daniel Eduardo Vila; 1 June 1953 (age 72); Mendoza, Argentina
- Other name: El Diablo
- Website: www.twitter.com/danielevila

Daniel Eduardo Vila (Mendoza, June 1 of 1953) is an entrepreneur, former sports director and lawyer in Argentina. He is president of America TV and Radio La Red, besides being the owner of the media Grupo América, in partnership with the former politician José Luis Manzano. He is also owner of Diario, a leading newspaper published in Mendoza, Santa Fe, Entre Rios and Rosario. He is also president of Diario La Capital de Rosario and president of Club Sportivo Independiente Rivadavia of Mendoza.

== Biography ==
Vila is a lawyer, is divorced and has six children. Since 2011 is with the model and presenter Pamela David is a shareholder and chairman of several media, energy and real estate category.

He is accompanied in most business by his brother Alfredo Luis Vila and former national deputy and Minister of the Interior during Menem's government (turned entrepreneur) José Luis Manzano. He began his media business in 1983 when he acquired Radio Nihuil of Mendoza.

In 1985 developed Supercanal SA with more than 500,000 subscribers in 17 provinces. In 1993 he founded his first newspaper in Mendoza, which he called Diario UNO. It was followed by buying “The Capital” of Rosario, UNO Entre Ríos and Santa Fe.

The Group also has radios in both AM and FM frequencies, the most emblematic being Radio La Red, with repeaters throughout the country and national television. “America” is a TV channel that is distributed throughout the country and abroad, and “A24” is a news cable signal nationally distributed. With the company Arlink UNO Media provides telecommunications services such as value-added broadband.

Vila also chairs the foundations “La Capital” and “Vendimia Solidaria”. The latter collects annually about a million and a half dollars, which are used for works of social support. He was also president of the Board of Directors of the University of Congress from 2001 to 2003. In the energy sector, his company Andes Energy is associated to YPF in the exploration and development of more than 30 oil areas in eight provinces of Argentina. He is also a shareholder and Edelar and Edemsa, both electricity distributors in Mendoza and La Rioja respectively.

== Activity in sports ==
Vila was Chair of the Club Sportivo Independiente Rivadavia of Mendoza from 2005 to 2012. while trying push a bill to "democratize " Argentine Football.

On Tuesday October 18, 2011 he was appointed President of AFA by provincial clubs of Football, which obtained court authorization to vote for him in an assembly in which the current officials sector reelected its president more than three decades, Julio Grondona.

This confusing situation awaits the definition of justice to find out who was legitimately elected to chair the Argentine Football Association.

== Academic life ==
Vila was Chairman of the Board of Directors of the University of Congress during 2001-2003. He is currently a professor at the same university where he teaches the "Media and Public Opinion" course. This gets him frequently traveling from Buenos Aires to Mendoza City.
