= América 24 =

A24
- Type: Free-to-air television channel
- Country: Argentina
- Broadcast area: Argentina; International
- Headquarters: Ciudad de Buenos Aires, Argentina

Programming
- Language: Spanish
- Picture format: 1080i HDTV (downscaled to 576i/480i for the SD feed)

Ownership
- Owner: Grupo América

History
- Launched: April 15, 1993
- Former names: CVN (1993-2005); América 24 (2005-2011)

Links
- Website: www.a24.com

Availability

Terrestrial
- Digital UHF: Channel 36.3 (Buenos Aires); Channel 31.2 (Mendoza)

A24 (or América 24) is an Argentine free-to-air news television channel. It is owned by Grupo América.

== History ==
=== CVN: CableVisión Noticias (1993-2005) ===
The original start of its broadcasts was on April 15, 1993, at 7:00 AM, hosted by Roberto Maidana and Cecilia Laratro, under the direction of journalist Eliseo Álvarez, projected by Corporación Multimedios América. In 1994, it began using the same set as América 2. In 1996, it changed its logo for the first time and was renamed CVN CableVisión Noticias. In 1999, it underwent another redesign. In August 2002, CVN changed its logo for the final time, adopting a design similar to América Noticias due to the sale of CVN from Ávila Inversora to América Multimedios. It ceased broadcasts on March 8, 2005, at 6:59 AM.

=== América 24 (2005-2011) ===
Its first broadcast occurred on March 8, 2005, at 7:00 AM, with the segment "Buenos días América" hosted by journalists Guillermo Andino and María Belén Aramburu.

The goal was to relaunch the news channel that had been preceded by CVN, which in its last five years had been neglected by its previous managers, losing more news hours and becoming a channel of general entertainment.

With the change in ownership of América Multimedios, CVN was rebranded as América 24 and became a news channel once again.

Despite heavy advertising and the presence of prominent journalists, it failed to regain the audience level of its predecessor, CVN, which had been a leader in the news sector during the 1990s.

Between 2006 and 2010, it broadcast the Torneo Argentino A.

=== A24 (2011-present) ===
On March 1, 2011, attempting to improve its image and news quality, the channel completely redesigned its logo and graphics, upgraded to a modern and larger studio, and dropped the name "América 24" to simply become "A24." Additionally, for the first time since its launch in 2005, the channel added news segments on Saturdays and Sundays throughout the day.

A few months later, the channel abruptly stopped its weekend newscasts (while signing a contract with the Argentine government) to broadcast football matches through the "Fútbol para todos" program.

On March 19, 2012, the channel was renewed once again, modifying its logo and graphics but with no significant structural changes. New segments such as "Mauro 360°", "Mediodía, más que noticias", "Último minuto", and "Vivo el sábado" were launched.

In April 2017, the channel brought in figures like Eduardo Feinmann, Jorge Rial, and Fernando Carnota.

In 2021, it lost several of its key figures to La Nación +, until on February 10, 2025, it regained many of them.

The channel's main studio is operating under decaying conditions as of July 2025, reports include broken microphones, damaged bathrooms and constant technical problems. BigBang News likened the situation to a community channel rather than a national channel. In spite of this, the channel has surpassed LN+ in ratings.
