= Crónica (newspaper) =

Daily newspaper based in Argentina

- Firme junto al pueblo
- Type: Daily newspaper
- Owner: Grupo Olmos
- Founder: Héctor Ricardo García
- Publisher: Alejandro Olmos
- Founded: July 29, 1963
- Political alignment: Populism; Kirchnerism
- Language: Spanish
- Headquarters: Buenos Aires, Argentina
- Circulation: 58,432
- Website: Crónica

Crónica is a daily newspaper published in Buenos Aires, Argentina.

Founded on July 29, 1963, by publisher Héctor Ricardo García, it became well known for its oversized headlines and yellow press approach; as García explained: "we needed a strident daily, with large and shocking headlines, like the kind one sees in Central America, because our papers were too placid."

The newspaper eventually reached a daily circulation of 800,000 and rivaled Clarín as the nation's leading news daily, was shuttered by President Isabel Perón in 1975, and though it was reopened in 1977, it never regained its former prominence. Crónica, whose logo is Firme junto al pueblo ("Firmly with the people"), is published with three editions: morning, evening and night, and its average daily circulation in 2006 was 58,432.

It is considered a banal and bizarre way of telling news in Argentina.

== 1966 Aerolineas Argentinas DC-4 hijacking ==
In 1966, the newspapers founder and then editor Héctor Ricardo García was involved in the 1966 Aerolineas Argentinas DC-4 hijacking in which the far-right Argentine nationalist Condor Group hijacked a commercial flight, redirecting it to the Falkland Islands. Amongst the passengers was Argentinian Rear Admiral José María Guzmán, who at the time was the then Governor of Tierra del Fuego (the Argentinian province to which the Falklands theoretically belonged). He claimed to have been invited along as a journalist, but it was later claimed he had been a key supporter in the hijacking.
