= Gobernador Dupuy Department, San Luis =

Gobernador Dupuy Department
- Department
- Location of Gobernador Dupuy Department in San Luis Province
- Coordinates: 34°45′S 65°15′W
- Country: Argentina
- Province: San Luis
- Seat: Buena Esperanza

Area
  - Total: 19,632 km^{2} (7,580 sq mi)

Population
  - Total: 11,120

Gobernador Dupuy is a department of San Luis Province, Argentina.

With an area of 19,632 km^{2} (7,580 sq mi) it is the biggest department in the province. It borders to the north with the departments of Juan Martín de Pueyrredón and General Pedernera, to the east with the provinces of Córdoba and La Pampa, to the south with La Pampa and to the west with Mendoza Province.

== Municipalities ==
- Anchorena
- Arizona
- Bagual
- Batavia
- Buena Esperanza
- Fortín El Patria
- Fortuna
- La Maroma
- Martín de Loyola
- Nahuel Mapá
- Navia
- Nueva Galia
- Unión

== Villages ==
- Aurora Puntana
- Bajada Nueva
- Casimiro Gómez
- Cochequingán
- Colonia Calzada
- Colonia La Florida
- Colonia La Verde
- Colonia Urdaniz
- Coronel Segovia
- El Peje
- El Porvenir
- Frisia
- Los Overos
- Nueva Constitución
- Usiyal
- Vicente Dupuy
