= San Luis + =

LV 90 TV Canal 13
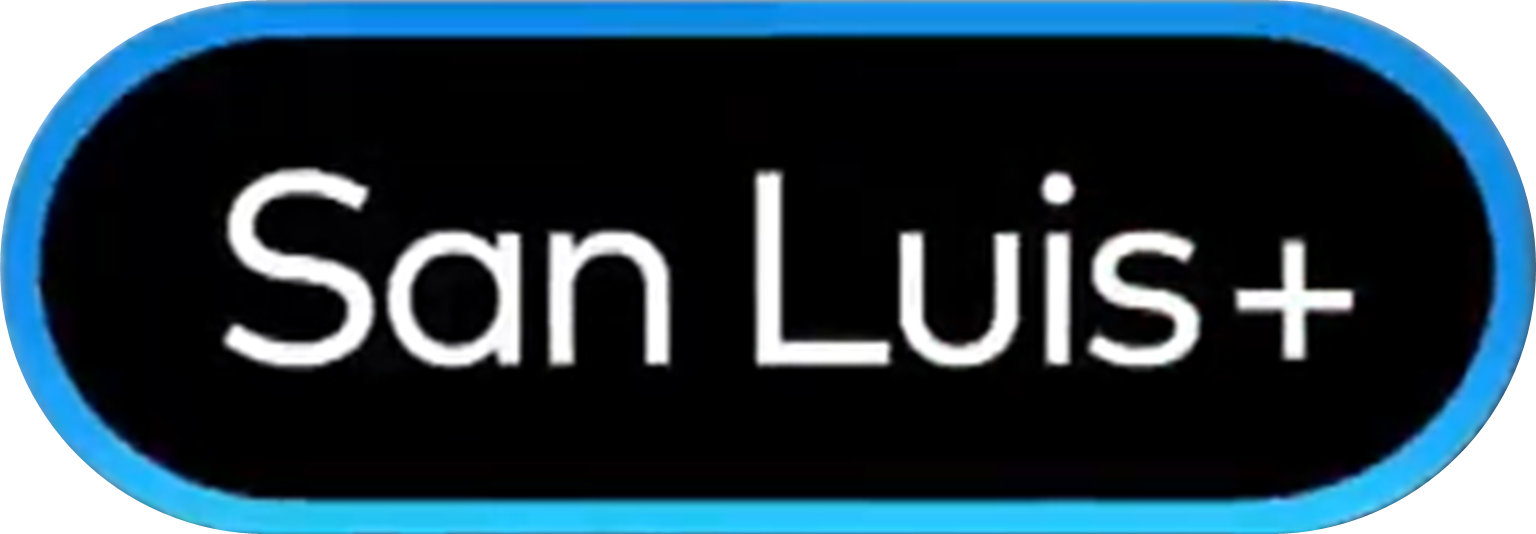
- San Luis; Argentina
- City: San Luis
- Channels: Analog: 13 (VHF); Digital: 28 (UHF)
- Branding: San Luis +

Programming
- Affiliations: Telefe

Ownership
- Owner: Government of San Luis Province; (San Luis Televisión Satélite S.E.)

History
- First air date: 24 December 1972
- Former names: Canal 13 San Luis (1972-1997; 2010-2023); El 13 Teve (1997-2001); San Luis Teve (2001-2008); San Luis Sat (2008-2009)

Technical information
- Licensing authority: ENACOM
- Repeater: See list

Links
- Website: sanluismas.com

Channel 13 San Luis (callsign LV 90 TV), known commercially as San Luis + (San Luis Más) is an Argentine television station licensed to San Luis, San Luis Province, carrying programs from Telefe. The station is owned by the provincial government.

== History ==
In 1964, in the city of San Luis, the first TV channel in the province, Channel 2, was founded. The outlet was a closed circuit system on cable, and was seen within the 4 main avenues that make up the capital. It was the first television station to broadcast live in the province, and had multiple programs. At 800 Colón Street, located in the central area of the capital of San Luis, it was the scene of the dreams of those who would be the pioneers of over-the-air television in that province.

On December 24, 1969, by means of Decree 8322 (published on March 23, 1970), the National Executive Chamber gave the provincial government a license to operate VHF channel 13 for the city of San Luis, capital of the province of the same name.

The license started its regular broadcasts on December 24, 1972 as LV 90 TV Canal 13 de San Luis.

The station continued from its initial premises at Colón Street until June 1978, when, due to the 1978 FIFA World Cup, as well as the arrival of color television, the provincial government gave green light to move its facilities to Puente Blanco, at Avenida del Fundador 985, where they are currently located.

In 1983, with the arrival of the democratic government,its coverage area grew by installing a network of relay stations reaching the entire province, as well as adjacent areas. On October 8, 1984, by means of Resolution 799, COMFER authorized the municipality of Ingeniero Luiggi to install a relay station there, on VHF channel 10. On October 15, 1986, by means of Resolution 764, it authorized the provincial government to install relay stations in Justo Daract (channel 44) and Soven (channel 63); however, on May 18, 2001 (through resolution 656), the construction permit was rejected, except for Soven (channel 44).

In February 2001, El 13 TV was renamed San Luis Teve.

In 2008, the station started broadcasting by satellite; as consequence, San Luis Teve was renamed San Luis Sat. On November 5, governor Alberto Rodríguez Saá took part in the official inauguration of the station's first studio at Casa de San Luis in Buenos Aires, held the same day. The facilities were built by high-level professionals and had cutting-edge technology for the time which put it at the height of the larger television networks around the world.

In 2010, the station was renamed Canal 13.

On June 24, 2011, AFSCA, by means of Resolution 689, granted Canal 13 UHF channel 28 to broadcast on digital terrestrial television.

It introduced a new identity on April 3, 2012 with new local programming.

In January 2013, the provincial government proposed a project to remodel, refunctionalize, prioritize and expand the channel's transmission plant. During that same year, the state channel strengthened its coverage to reach the entire San Luis region in the best possible way. In addition, a technological renovation is planned that will allow transmission in High definition and through mobile devices.

Digital terrestrial broadcasts started in May 2014 on all 14 transmitters on channel 28.1, ahead of the 2014 FIFA World Cup.

On May 18, 2015, Governor Claudio Poggi and authorities reopened the transmission plant with new and modern facilities: 2,365 m² of existing infrastructure was renovated and 509 new m² were built for the construction of 3 new studios and entrance to the channel (on Catamarca Street).

On July 2, 2015, Canal 13 launched a mobile app featuring its live stream, catch-up of its local programming and news.

On November 8, 2017, Canal 13 started airing in high definition.

On December 10, 2023, it was renamed San Luis +.

== Programming ==
In addition to the relays of Telefe's programming, its local programming includes Más Noticias (its news service), Agenda directa (morning magazine), Gracias por estar (entertainment program) and Entrevistas (general interest) among others.

In April 2009, Canal 13 ceased relaying Telefe's, replacing it with local programming, however, on January 21, 2024, said programming returned.

== Servicio de Noticias 13 ==
is the news operation. It has four editions on weekdays (at 07:00, San Luis Hoy, 13:00, El Noticiero de San Luis at 20:00 , Panorama Provincial and at midnight, Hora de Cierre).

Originally, the news program was called Panorama Provincial in the 1980s. In 1994, it was renamed Canal 13 Noticias until 1997, changing to Revista 13.

In February 2001, the channel's news service changed its name to San Luis Hoy.

By 2008, the newscast was renamed El noticiero de San Luis.

On April 3, 2012, as part of the change in the institutional image, it changed its name to Noticias 13; However, there were other editions: Hora de cierre (at midnight) and La Portada that remained until 2013.

On December 11, 2023, a day after adopting its current name, the news program changed its name to Más Noticias.

== Translators ==
Canal 13 has 19 relay stations throughout the province.

San Luis Province
| Channel | Location |
| 2 | Anchorena |
| 8 | Cerro El Amago |
| 36 | Cerro Tomolasta/La Carolina |
| 43 | Concarán |
| 5 | Fortuna |
| 38 | Justo Daract |
| 40 | La Punta |
| 41 | La Toma |
| 8 | Martín de Loyola |
| 30 | Merlo |
| 47 | Naschel |
| 41 | Navia |
| 39 | Paso Grande |
| 13 | Potrero de los Funes |
| 11 | San Jerónimo |
| 12 | San Miguel |
| 45 | Tilisarao |
| 4 | Villa de Praga |
| 11 | Villa Mercedes |
