= Chacabuco Department, San Luis =

Chacabuco Department
- Department
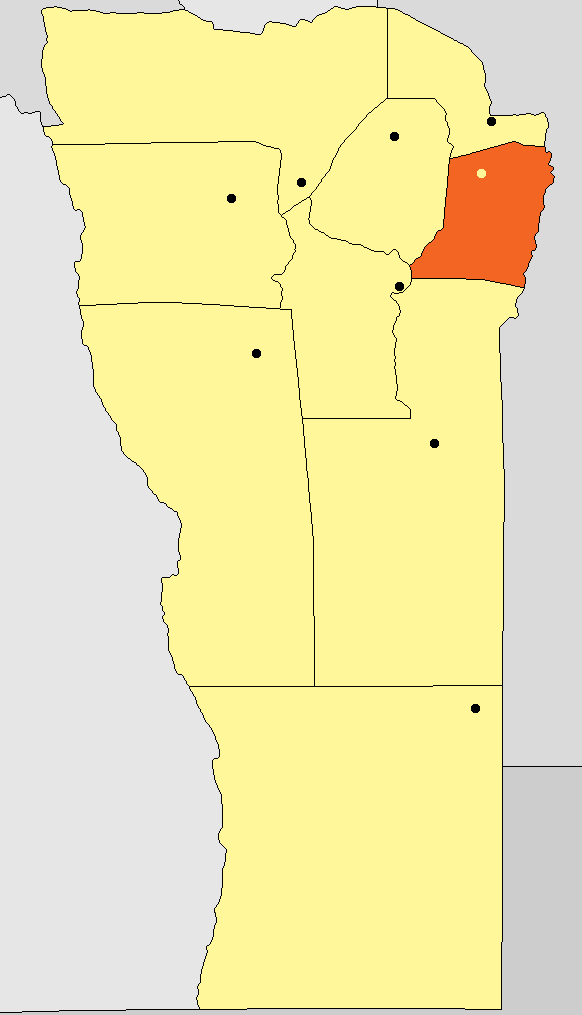
- Location of Chacabuco Department in San Luis Province
- Coordinates: 32°39′S 65°14′W
- Argentina: Argentina
- Province: San Luis

Area
  - Total: 2,651 km^{2} (1,024 sq mi)

Population
  - Total: 18,410

Chacabuco is a department of San Luis Province, Argentina.

With an area of 2,651 km^{2} (1,024 sq mi) it borders to the north with the department of Junín, to the west with San Martín and Coronel Pringles Department, San Luis, to the south with General Pedernera, and to the east with Cordoba Province

== Municipalities ==
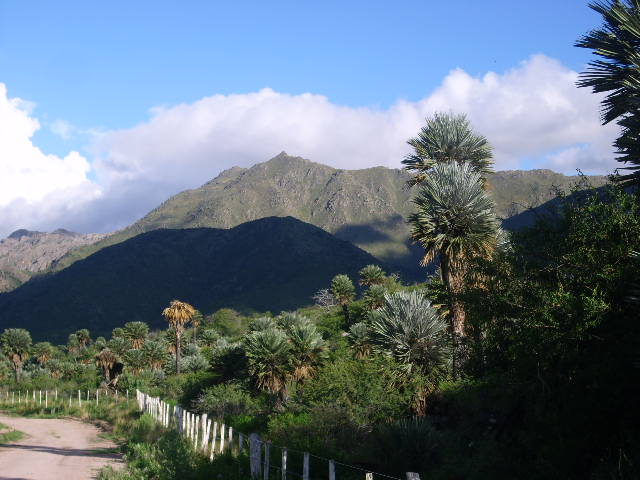
Sierras de Papagayos

- Concarán
- Cortaderas
- Naschel
- Papagayos
- Renca
- San Pablo
- Tilisarao
- Villa del Carmen
- Villa Larca

== Education ==
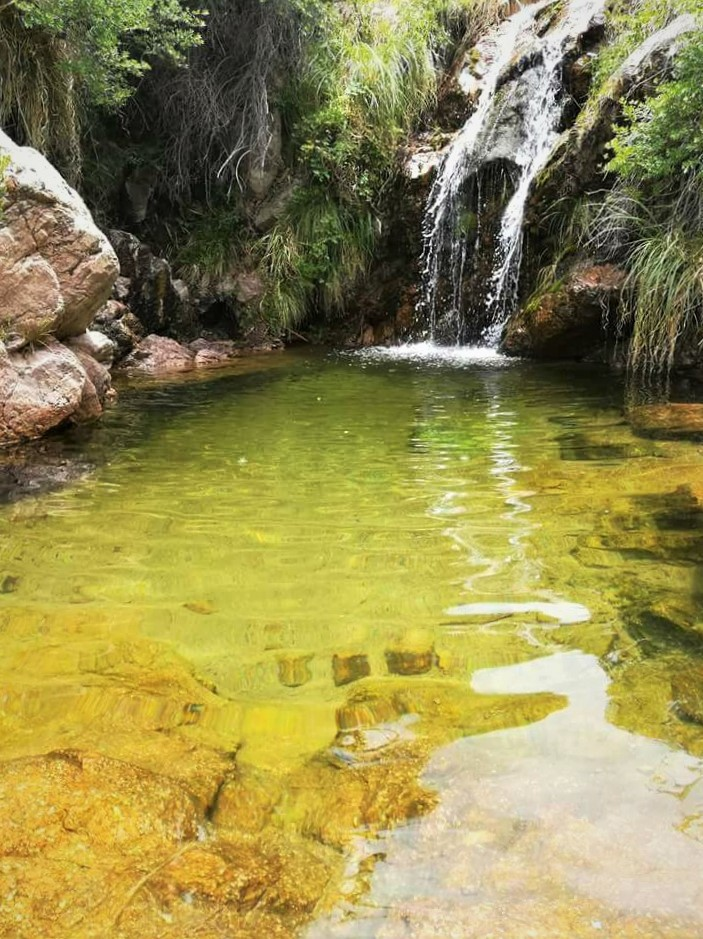
Laguna Milagrosa, a little pond with a waterfall in Villa Larca

The capital of the department, Concarán, hosts the Technical School Governor Elias Adre, that is one of the three best secondary schools of San Luis Province. The Technical School title is of "electromechanic". As of 2018, the secondary has around 300 students, most of them, Concarán residents, but many students from surrounding towns, like Tilisarao, Villa Larca, and Merlo as well. And in a lower percentage, exchange or expat students, from the rest of America, and Europe. The school has a natatorium, two gymnasiums, one medium-sized and another huge, three workshops: Electricity, Carpentry, and Mechanics. It has a sciences lab too. Because it's a technical school, it has 7 years, from First Year to Seventh Year, (or 7th Grade to 13th Grade, in the North American system), so students graduate when they are 18.

== Villages ==
- Balcarce
- Canal Norte
- Cuatro Esquinas
- El Churrasco
- El Porvenir
- El Recuerdo
- El Sauce
- El Sifón
- El Tala
- La Celestina
- La Estanzuela
- La Suiza
- Las Canteras
- Las Rosas
- Los Lobos
- Los Quebrachos
- Loma Verde
- Ojo de Agua
- Punta del Monte
- San Felipe
- San Miguel
- Santa Martina
- Villa Elena
