= Ayacucho Department, San Luis =

Ayacucho Departamento de Ayacucho
- Department
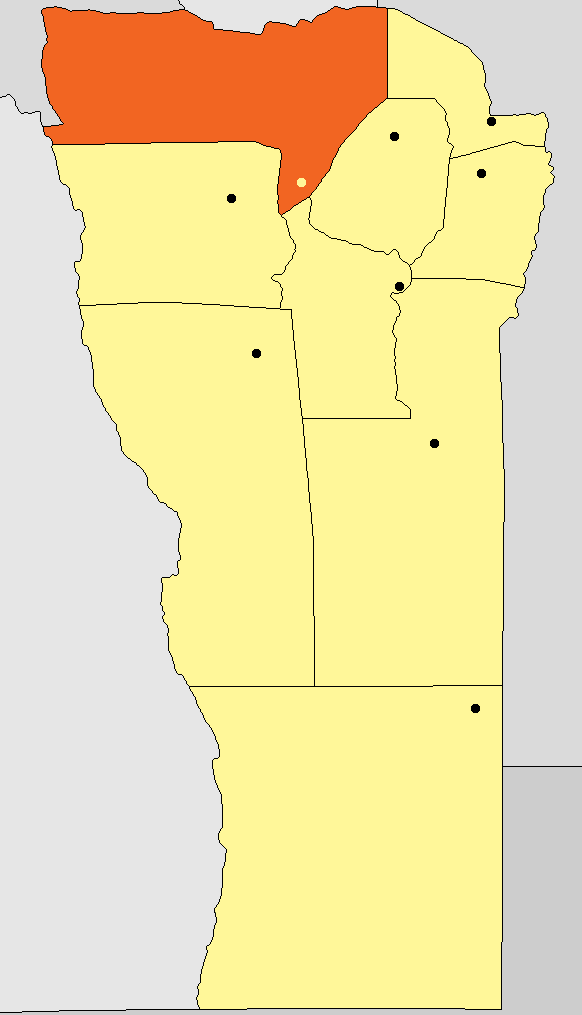
- Location of Ayacucho Department in San Luis Province
- Coordinates: 32°36′S 66°7′W
- Argentina: Argentina
- Province: San Luis

Population
  - Total: 16,906

Ayacucho is a department of San Luis Province, Argentina.

With an area of 9,681 km^{2} (3,738 sq mi) it borders to the east with the departments of Junín and San Martín, to the south with Coronel Pringles and Belgrano, to the west with the provinces of Mendoza and San Juan, and to the north with San Juan, La Rioja and Córdoba, which makes it the only department in Argentina which borders four provinces.

== Municipalities ==
- Candelaria
- La Majada
- Leandro N. Alem
- Luján
- Quines
- Río Juan Gómez
- San Francisco del Monte de Oro

== Villages ==
- Agro Candelaria
- Balde de Azcurra
- Balde de Puertas
- Balde de Quines
- Baldecito
- Barzola
- Bella Vista
- El Bañado
- El Cadillo
- El Chañar
- El Retamo
- El Vinagrillo
- El Zampal
- El Zapallar
- La Botija
- La Chañarienta
- La Leona
- La Selva
- La Tranca
- La Venecia
- Lomas Blancas
- Punta Negra
- San Ignacio
- San Roque
- San Vicente
- Santa Rosa de Cantantal
- La Candela
- La Aguada
