= Libertador General San Martín Department, San Luis =

Libertador General San Martín
- Department
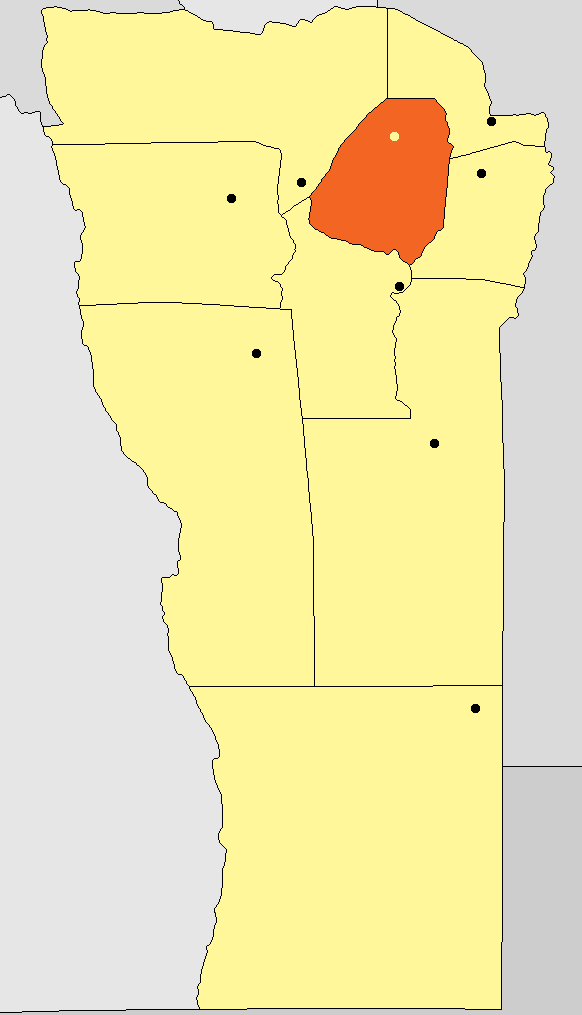
- Location of Libertador General San Martín Department in San Luis Province
- Country: Argentina
- Province: San Luis

Area
  - Total: 3,021 km^{2} (1,166 sq mi)

Population (2001)
  - Total: 5,189
  - Density: 1.718/km^{2} (4.449/sq mi)
- 2001 census [INDEC]

Libertador General San Martín is a Department of San Luis Province, Argentina.

With an area of 3,021 km^{2} (1,166 sq mi) it borders to the north with the Department of Junín, to the east with Chacabuco, to the south with Coronel Pringles and to the west with Ayacucho.

== Municipalities ==
- Las Aguadas
- Las Chacras
- Las Lagunas
- Las Vertientes
- Paso Grande
- San Martín
- Villa de Praga

== Villages ==
- Alsa
- Bajo de Veliz
- Barrancos Altos
- Buena Vista
- Cabeza de Novillo
- Cañada Quemada
- Cerros Largos
- El Arenal
- El Divisadero
- El Estanquito
- El Rincón
- El Valle
- Intihuasi
- La Ciénaga
- La Cocha
- La Huerta
- La Ramada
- La Tolora
- Las Lagunas
- Los Comederos
- Manantial
- Mesilla del Cura
- 9 de julio
- Piedras Anchas
- Potrerillo
- Puerta Colorada
- Quebrada de San Vicente
- Rincón del Carmen
- Rodeo Viejo
- San Antonio
- San Isidro
- San Rafael
- Tala Verde
