= Coronel Pringles Department, San Luis =

Coronel Pringles Department Departamento Coronel Pringles
- Department
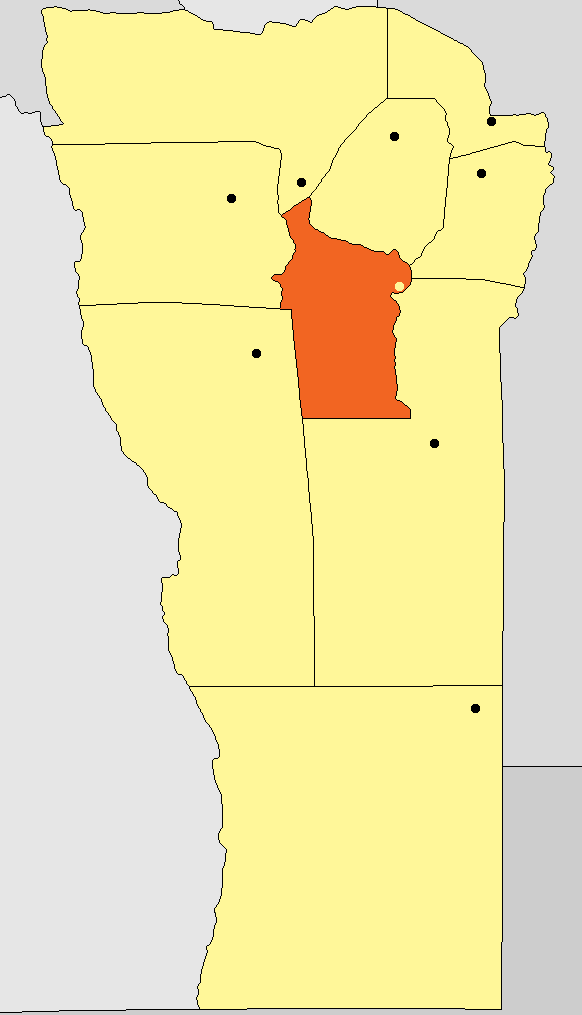
- Location of Coronel Pringles Department in San Luis Province
- Coordinates: 33°3′S 65°37′W
- Argentina: Argentina
- Province: San Luis
- Seat: La Toma

Area
  - Total: 4,484 km^{2} (1,731 sq mi)

Population
  - Total: 12,571

'Coronel Pringles is a department of San Luis Province, Argentina.

With an area of 4,484 km^{2} (1,731 sq mi) it borders to the north with the departments of Ayacucho and San Martín, to the east with Chacabuco and General Pedernera, to the south with Pedernera, and to the west with Juan Martín de Pueyrredón, and Belgrano.

== Municipalities ==
- Carolina
- El Trapiche
- Estancia Grande
- Fraga
- La Bajada
- La Florida
- La Toma
- Riocito
- Saladillo

== Villages ==
- Arroyo Barranquita
- Balde de la Isla
- Baldecitos
- Cañada Honda
- Comandante Granville
- Cuatro Esquinas
- El Amago
- El Durazno
- El Manantial
- El Zapallar
- Eleodoro Lobos
- Juan Gez
- La Arenilla
- La Atalaya
- La Cumbre
- La Petra
- La Puerta
- Las Totoras
- Los Membrillos
- Los Pocitos
- Pampa del Tamboreo
- Paso de las Carretas
- Paso del Rey
- Puerta de Pancanta
- Río Grande
- San Gregorio
- Valle de Pancanta
- Virorco
- El Guanaco
