= General Pedernera Department =

- Department
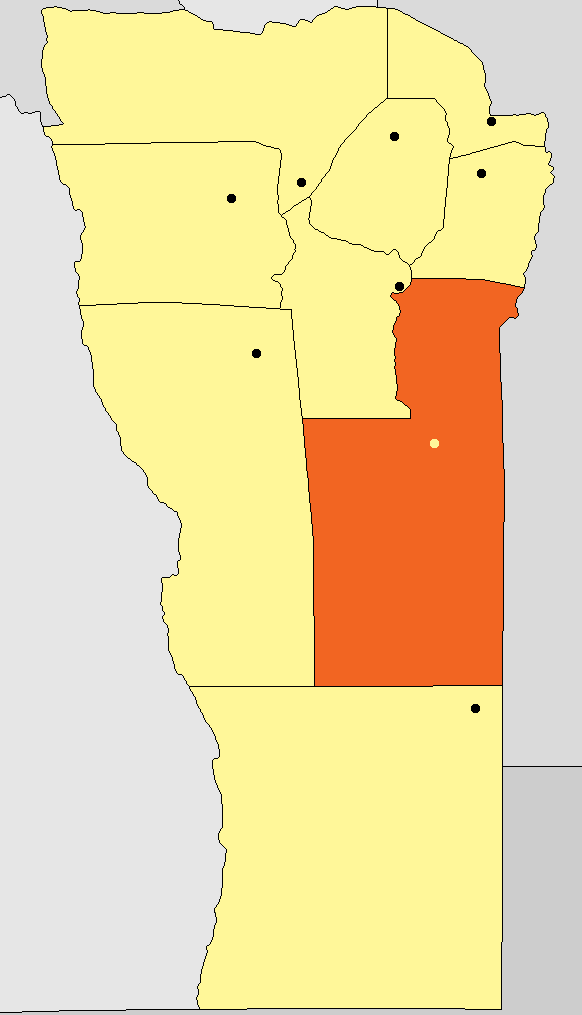
- Location of General Pedernera Department in San Luis Province
- Coordinates: 33°40′S 65°27′W
- Country: Argentina
- Province: San Luis
- Seat: Villa Mercedes

Population
  - Total: 110,814

General Pedernera is a department of San Luis Province, Argentina.

With an area of 15,057 km^{2} (5,814 sq mi) it borders to the north with the department of Coronel Pringles and Chacabuco, to the east with Córdoba Province, to the south with Gobernador Dupuy and to the west with Juan Martín de Pueyrredón.

Its name pays homage to Lieutenant-general Juan Esteban Pedernera who fought with the Regiment of Mounted Grenadiers during the Argentine War of Independence and became the interim president of the Argentine Confederation.

On October 14, 2009, the government of San Luis passed the decree of need and urgency No. 2884 MGJyC 09, which created the municipality of the Ranquel people-nation in 66.000 hectares of the General Pedernera Department, so as to provide a settlement for members of the Ranquel native people. In addition, a delegate was designed to manage the municipality, organized according to the traditions and customs of the Ranquel people.

According to the 2010 national census, there are 125.470 inhabitants in the department.

== Municipalities ==
- Juan Jorba
- Juan Llerena
- Justo Daract
- La Punilla
- Lavaisse
- San José del Morro
- Villa Mercedes
- Villa Reynolds
- Villa Salles

== Villages ==
- Caldenadas
- Chalanta
- Coronel Alzogaray
- Crámer
- El Centenario
- El Durazno
- Gloria de Dios
- La Aguada
- La Angelina
- La Esquina
- La Portada
- Las Isletas
- Las Vizcacheras
- Liborio Luna
- Pedernera
- Pioneros Siglo XXI
- Río Quinto
- Soven
- Travesía
