= 2016 Tour Femenino de San Luis =

Race details
- Dates: 10 January–15 January
- Stages: 6
- Distance: 520 km (323.1 mi)
- Winning time: 13h 56' 45"

Results
Jersey awarded to the overall winner	Winner	Katie Hall (USA)	(UnitedHealthcare Women's Team)
	Second	Małgorzata Jasińska (POL)	(Alé–Cipollini–Galassia)
	Third	Arlenis Sierra (CUB)	(Cuba (National team))
Jersey awarded to the youth classification winner	Youth	Aranza Valentina Villalón (CHI)	(Weber–Shimano Ladies Power Team)
	Team	Alé–Cipollini–Galassia	

The 2016 Tour Femenino de San Luis is the third edition of a stage race held in the San Luis Province in Argentina, with a UCI rating of 2.1, from 10 January to 15 January. It was the first race of the 2016 Women's Elite cycling calendar and mirrored the men's cycling event, the Tour de San Luis.

== Teams ==
UCI Women's Teams

- UnitedHealthcare
- Servetto Footon
- Team TIBCO-SVB
- Weber–Shimano Ladies Power Team
- Alé–Cipollini–Galassia
- Xirayas de San Luis
- Lares–Waowdeals

Club teams

- Cycling Girls Team — Felt
- Conade — Visit Mexico
- Bontrager—2122
- Pedalea C T Colombia
- W C T La Plata
- Raleigh — Delsanto
- Fulvic Soul Cycles
- Imperial Cord
- Nitrobikes — Venzo
- Nova

National teams

- Ukraine
- Venezuela
- Brazil
- Spain
- Cuba

== Stages ==
=== Stage 1 ===
10 January 2015 – El Durazno to El Durazno, 110.3 km (68.5 mi)

Stage 1 result

	Rider	Team	Time
1	Coryn Rivera (USA)	UnitedHealthcare	2h 53' 09"
2	Marta Tagliaferro (ITA)	Alé–Cipollini–Galassia	s.t.
3	Kelly Markus (NED)	Lares–Waowdeals	s.t.
4	Arlenis Sierra (CUB)	Cuba (National team)	s.t.
5	Yumari González (CUB)	Cuba (National team)	s.t.
6	Sheyla Gutiérrez (ESP)	Spain (National team)	s.t.
7	Valeriya Kononenko (UKR)	Ukraine (National team)	s.t.
8	Viviana Narvaez (COL)	Cycling Girls Team — Felt	s.t.
9	Olga Shekel (UKR)	Ukraine (National team)	s.t.
10	Paola Muñoz (CHI)	Xirayas de San Luis	s.t.

General Classification after Stage 1

	Rider	Team	Time
1	Coryn Rivera (USA)	UnitedHealthcare	2h 52' 57"
2	Marta Tagliaferro (ITA)	Alé–Cipollini–Galassia	+ 3"
3	Kelly Markus (NED)	Lares–Waowdeals	+8"
4	Olga Echenique (CUB)	Cuba (National team)	+9"
5	Anna Trevisi (ITA)	Alé–Cipollini–Galassia	+10"
6	Valeriya Kononenko (UKR)	Ukraine (National team)	+11"
7	Brianna Walle (USA)	Team TIBCO-SVB	+11"
8	Arlenis Sierra (CUB)	Cuba (National team)	+12"
9	Yumari González (CUB)	Cuba (National team)	+12"
10	Sheyla Gutiérrez (ESP)	Spain (National team)	+12"

=== Stage 2 ===
11 January 2015 – Villa Mercedes to Villa Mercedes, 98.6 km (61.3 mi)

Stage 2 result

	Rider	Team	Time
1	Marta Tagliaferro (ITA)	Alé–Cipollini–Galassia	2h 39' 03"
2	Valeriya Kononenko (UKR)	Ukraine (National team)	s.t.
3	Anna Trevisi (ITA)	Alé–Cipollini–Galassia	s.t.
4	Emilia Fahlin (SWE)	Alé–Cipollini–Galassia	s.t.
5	Ana Teresa Casas (MEX)	Conade — Visit Mexico	s.t.
6	Arlenis Sierra (CUB)	Cuba (National team)	s.t.
7	Kendall Ryan (USA)	Team TIBCO-SVB	s.t.
8	Coryn Rivera (USA)	UnitedHealthcare	s.t.
9	Maryna Ivaniuk (UKR)	Ukraine (National team)	s.t.
10	Kelly Markus (NED)	Lares–Waowdeals	s.t.

General Classification after Stage 2

	Rider	Team	Time
1	Marta Tagliaferro (ITA)	Alé–Cipollini–Galassia	5h 31' 57"
2	Coryn Rivera (USA)	UnitedHealthcare	+7"
3	Valeriya Kononenko (UKR)	Ukraine (National team)	+14"
4	Arlenis Sierra (CUB)	Cuba (National team)	+15"
5	Anna Trevisi (ITA)	Alé–Cipollini–Galassia	+15"
6	Olga Echenique (CUB)	Cuba (National team)	+18"
7	Brianna Walle (USA)	Team TIBCO-SVB	+20"
8	Yumari González (CUB)	Cuba (National team)	+21"
9	Olga Shekel (UKR)	Ukraine (National team)	+21"
10	Paola Muñoz (CHI)	Xirayas de San Luis	+21"

=== Stage 3 ===
12 January 2015 – Naschel to Merlo, 121.3 km (75.4 mi)

Stage 3 result

	Rider	Team	Time
1	Iraida Garcia (CUB)	Cuba (National team)	3h 14' 48"
2	Aranza Valentina Villalón (CHI)	Weber–Shimano Ladies Power Team	+4"
3	Małgorzata Jasińska (POL)	Alé–Cipollini–Galassia	+5"
4	Lauren Stephens (USA)	Team TIBCO-SVB	+5"
5	Lorena Vargas (COL)	Cycling Girls Team — Felt	+14"
6	Janildes Fernandes Silva (BRA)	Brazil (National team)	+25"
7	Paola Muñoz (CHI)	Xirayas de San Luis	+34"
8	Daniela Lionço (BRA)	Fulvic Soul Cycles	+34"
9	Ane Santesteban (ESP)	Alé–Cipollini–Galassia	+34"
10	Yngrid Porras (VEN)	Venezuela (National team)	+34"

General Classification after Stage 3

	Rider	Team	Time
1	Iraida Garcia (CUB)	Cuba (National team)	8h 46' 45"
2	Aranza Valentina Villalón (CHI)	Weber–Shimano Ladies Power Team	+12"
3	Małgorzata Jasińska (POL)	Alé–Cipollini–Galassia	+16"
4	Lauren Stephens (USA)	Team TIBCO-SVB	+20"
5	Lorena Vargas (COL)	Cycling Girls Team — Felt	+29"
6	Marta Tagliaferro (ITA)	Alé–Cipollini–Galassia	+37"
7	Valeriya Kononenko (UKR)	Ukraine (National team)	+42"
8	Olga Echenique (CUB)	Cuba (National team)	+46"
9	Paola Muñoz (CHI)	Xirayas de San Luis	+49"
10	Yumari González (CUB)	Cuba (National team)	+49"

=== Stage 4 ===
13 January 2015 – El Durazno, 12.8 km (8.0 mi) individual time trial (ITT)

Stage 4 result

	Rider	Team	Time
1	Lauren Stephens (USA)	Team TIBCO-SVB	17' 32"
2	Katie Hall (USA)	UnitedHealthcare Women's Team	+43"
3	Maria Carla Alvarez (ARG)	Xirayas de San Luis	+50"
4	Arlenis Sierra (CUB)	Cuba (National team)	+1'02"
5	Aranza Valentina Villalón (CHI)	Weber–Shimano Ladies Power Team	+1'05"
6	Ana Sanabria (COL)	Cycling Girls Team — Felt	+1'07"
7	Małgorzata Jasińska (POL)	Alé–Cipollini–Galassia	+1'11"
8	Emilia Fahlin (SWE)	Alé–Cipollini–Galassia	+1'12"
9	Daniela Lionço (BRA)	Fulvic Soul Cycles	+1'13"
10	Lorena Vargas (COL)	Cycling Girls Team — Felt	+1'17"

General Classification after Stage 4

	Rider	Team	Time
1	Lauren Stephens (USA)	Team TIBCO-SVB	9h 04' 37"
2	Aranza Valentina Villalón (CHI)	Weber–Shimano Ladies Power Team	+57"
3	Małgorzata Jasińska (POL)	Alé–Cipollini–Galassia	+1'07"
4	Iraida Garcia (CUB)	Cuba (National team)	+1'11"
5	Katie Hall (USA)	UnitedHealthcare Women's Team	+1'12"
6	Lorena Vargas (COL)	Cycling Girls Team — Felt	+1'26"
7	Maria Carla Alvarez (ARG)	Xirayas de San Luis	+1'29"
8	Arlenis Sierra (CUB)	Cuba (National team)	+1'33"
9	Ana Sanabria (COL)	Cycling Girls Team — Felt	+1'36"
10	Emilia Fahlin (SWE)	Alé–Cipollini–Galassia	+1'41"

=== Stage 5 ===
14 January 2015 – Juana Koslay to Mirador del Potrero, 97.4 km (60.5 mi)

Stage 5 result

	Rider	Team	Time
1	Katie Hall (USA)	UnitedHealthcare Women's Team	2h 53' 45"
2	Arlenis Sierra (CUB)	Cuba (National team)	+17"
3	Małgorzata Jasińska (POL)	Alé–Cipollini–Galassia	+23"
4	Yevgenia Vysotska (UKR)	Ukraine (National team)	+37"
5	Iraida Garcia (CUB)	Cuba (National team)	+43"
6	Ane Santesteban (ESP)	Alé–Cipollini–Galassia	+53"
7	Denisse Ahumada (CHI)	W C T La Plata	+57"
8	Ana Sanabria (COL)	Cycling Girls Team — Felt	+1'03"
9	Olena Sharga (UKR)	Ukraine (National team)	+1'03"
10	Jessenia Meneses (COL)	Weber–Shimano Ladies Power Team	+1'06"

General Classification after Stage 5

	Rider	Team	Time
1	Katie Hall (USA)	UnitedHealthcare Women's Team	11h 59' 24"
2	Małgorzata Jasińska (POL)	Alé–Cipollini–Galassia	+24"
3	Lauren Stephens (USA)	Team TIBCO-SVB	+25"
4	Arlenis Sierra (CUB)	Cuba (National team)	+39"
5	Iraida Garcia (CUB)	Cuba (National team)	+52"
6	Ana Sanabria (COL)	Cycling Girls Team — Felt	+1'37"
7	Maria Carla Alvarez (ARG)	Xirayas de San Luis	+1'47"
8	Emilia Fahlin (SWE)	Alé–Cipollini–Galassia	+2'01"
9	Aranza Valentina Villalón (CHI)	Weber–Shimano Ladies Power Team	+2'06"
10	Ane Santesteban (ESP)	Alé–Cipollini–Galassia	+2'16"

=== Stage 6 ===
15 January 2015 – San Luis to San Luis, 79.6 km (49.5 mi)

Stage 6 result

	Rider	Team	Time
1	Arlenis Sierra (CUB)	Cuba (National team)	1h 57' 21"
2	Paola Muñoz (CHI)	Xirayas de San Luis	s.t.
3	Małgorzata Jasińska (POL)	Alé–Cipollini–Galassia	s.t.
4	Denisse Ahumada (CHI)	W C T La Plata	s.t.
5	Marta Tagliaferro (ITA)	Alé–Cipollini–Galassia	s.t.
6	Luciene Ferreira (BRA)	Weber–Shimano Ladies Power Team	s.t.
7	Yngrid Porras (VEN)	Venezuela (National team)	s.t.
8	Sheyla Gutiérrez (ESP)	Spain (National team)	s.t.
9	Iraida Garcia (CUB)	Cuba (National team)	s.t.
10	Kelly Marcus (NED)	Lares–Waowdeals	s.t.

General Classification after Stage 6

	Rider	Team	Time
1	Katie Hall (USA)	UnitedHealthcare Women's Team	13h 56' 45"
2	Małgorzata Jasińska (POL)	Alé–Cipollini–Galassia	+20"
3	Arlenis Sierra (CUB)	Cuba (National team)	+23"
4	Lauren Stephens (USA)	Team TIBCO-SVB	+25"
5	Iraida Garcia (CUB)	Cuba (National team)	+50"
6	Ana Sanabria (COL)	Cycling Girls Team — Felt	+1'51"
7	Emilia Fahlin (SWE)	Alé–Cipollini–Galassia	+2'01"
8	Maria Carla Alvarez (ARG)	Xirayas de San Luis	+2'01"
9	Aranza Valentina Villalón (CHI)	Weber–Shimano Ladies Power Team	+2'06"
10	Ane Santesteban (ESP)	Alé–Cipollini–Galassia	+2'24"

== Jerseys ==
denotes the overall race leader
denotes the highest placed rider who is under 23 years of age
denotes the mountain classification leader
denotes the highest placed Argentinian rider

== Classification leadership ==
Stage	Winner	General classification	Young rider classification	Mountain classification	Argentinian rider classification	Team classification
1	Coryn Rivera	Coryn Rivera	Olga Echenique	Katie Hall	Caterin Previley	Cuba (National team)
2	Marta Tagliaferro	Marta Tagliaferro	Olga Echenique	Arlenis Sierra	Caterin Previley	Cuba (National team)
3	Iraida Garcia	Iraida Garcia	Aranza Valentina Villalón	Katie Hall	Caterin Previley	Cuba (National team)
4	Lauren Stephens	Lauren Stephens	Aranza Valentina Villalón	Katie Hall	Maria Carla Alvarez	Alé–Cipollini–Galassia
5	Katie Hall	Katie Hall	Aranza Valentina Villalón	Katie Hall	Maria Carla Alvarez	Alé–Cipollini–Galassia
6	Arlenis Sierra	Katie Hall	Aranza Valentina Villalón	Katie Hall	Maria Carla Alvarez	Alé–Cipollini–Galassia
Final		Katie Hall	Aranza Valentina Villalón	Katie Hall	Maria Carla Alvarez	Alé–Cipollini–Galassia

== See also ==
- 2016 in women's road cycling
