= Villa Carmen =

Villa Carmen may refer to:

- Villa Carmen, Panama
- Villa del Carmen, Durazno Department, Uruguay
- Villa del Carmen, Formosa, Argentina
- Villa del Carmen, San Luis, Argentina
