= Belgrano Department, San Luis =

Belgrano Department
- Department
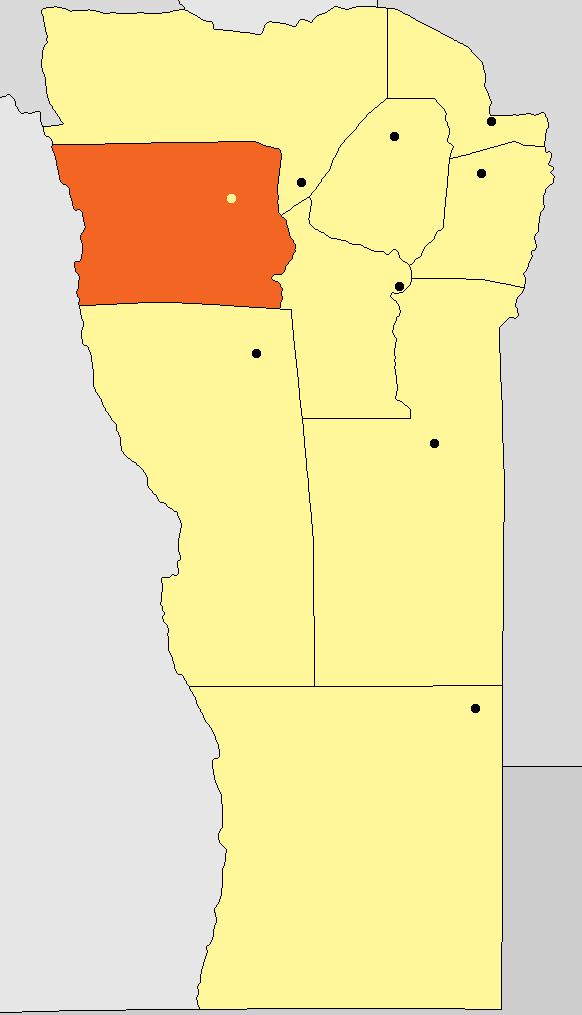
- Location of Belgrano Department in San Luis Province
- Coordinates: 32°39′S 66°27′W
- Argentina: Argentina
- Province: San Luis

Area
  - Total: 6,626 km^{2} (2,558 sq mi)

Population (2001)
  - Total: 3,881
- Capital: Villa General Roca

Belgrano is a department of San Luis Province, Argentina.

With an area of 6,626 km^{2} (2,558 sq mi) it borders to the north with the departments of Ayacucho, to the east with Ayacucho and Coronel Pringles, to the south with Juan Martín de Pueyrredón, and to the west with Mendoza Province.

== Municipalities ==
- La Calera
- Nogolí
- Villa de la Quebrada
- Villa General Roca

== Villages ==
- Alto Tavira
- Árbol Solo
- Bajo del Durazno
- Barrial
- Bella Estancia
- Buen Orden
- Cabeza de Vaca
- Cañada de Vilán
- Divisadero
- El Chañar
- El Dichoso
- El Gigante
- El Jarillal
- El Milagro
- El Ramblón
- El Recodo
- El Sosiego
- Hualtarán
- La Aurora
- La Perlita
- Las Brisas
- Los Araditos
- Los Cerrillos
- Los Ramblones
- Pozo del Tala
- Puerta de la Quebrada
- Represa del Carmen
- San Antonio
- San Isidro
- Vizcachera
- Toro Negro
