= Fortuna (disambiguation) =

Fortuna is the Roman goddess of luck.

Fortuna (Latin for "fortune") can also mean:

== Places ==
=== South Georgia Island ===
- Fortuna Bay, South Georgia Island
- Fortuna Glacier, South Georgia Island

=== United States ===
- Fortuna, Arizona, a ghost town
- Fortuna, California, a city
- Fortuna, Missouri, an unincorporated community
- Fortuna, North Dakota, a small city
- Fortuna, U.S. Virgin Islands, a settlement

=== Elsewhere ===
- Fortuna, San Luis, a village and municipality in Argentina
- Fortuna, Maranhão, a municipality in Brazil
- Fortuna, Murcia, a town in Spain
- Fortuna Forest Reserve, Panama
- 19 Fortuna, an asteroid

== People ==
- Fortuna (surname)
- Diego Mazquiarán (1895-1940), Spanish matador known as Fortuna
- Fortuna (Brazilian singer), female singer and composer from Brazil

== Arts and entertainment ==
- Fortuna (album), a 2019 album by Italian singer Emma
- "Fortuna", a 2022 single by Chinese singer Lexie Liu
- Fortuna (film), an Israeli film directed by Menahem Golan
- Fortuna (telenovela), a 2013 Mexican telenovela
- Bib Fortuna, a Star Wars character
- Fortuna, a name for Bagatelle, a game developed from billiard
- Fortuna, a fictional planet from the Star Fox series
- Fortuna, a town on Venus in the online game Warframe

== Ships ==
- Margaritaville at Sea Beachcomber, formerly the Costa Fortuna, a cruise ship built in 2003
- Fortuna (steamboat), a vessel that operated on Lake Washington in the early 20th century
- Fortuna, various yachts used by Spanish King Juan Carlos I

== Sports ==
- ACS Fortuna Covaci, a Romanian football club
- CD Fortuna, a Spanish football team from Leganés
- FC Fortuna Mytishchi, a former Russian football team (2003-2009)
- FK Fortuna Skopje, a Macedonian football club
- Fortuna Ålesund, a Norwegian women's football club
- Fortuna Arena, a stadium in Prague, Czech Republic
- Fortuna Düsseldorf, a German football club
- Fortuna Hjørring, a Danish women's football team
- Fortuna liga (disambiguation), several sports competitions
- Fortuna Sittard, a Dutch football club
- Fortuna Vlaardingen, a Dutch football club
- SC Fortuna Köln, a German football club
- SV Fortuna Magdeburg, a German football club
- VfB Fortuna Chemnitz, a German football club

== Other uses ==
- Fortuna Air Force Station, North Dakota, an abandoned Air Force Long Range radar site
- Fortuna station (SEPTA), a railway station in Hatfield, Pennsylvania
- Fortuna railway station (Mexico City), operated by Ferrocarriles Suburbanos
- Fortuna (cigarette), a cigarette brand owned by Altadis
- Fortuna (PRNG), an algorithm for cryptographically secure pseudo-random number generation
- Fortuna, a genetically modified potato developed by BASF Plant Science

== See also ==
- Fortune (disambiguation)
- La Fortuna (disambiguation)
- O Fortuna (album), a 2009 studio album by Welsh classical singer Rhydian
- "O Fortuna", a 13th-century medieval Latin Goliardic poem; set to music by Carl Orff
