= Luján, San Luis =

Coordinates: 32°22′S 65°57′W

Luján
- Municipality and village
- Interactive map of Luján
- Country: Argentina
- Province: San Luis Province
- Department: Ayacucho Department
- Time zone: UTC−3 (ART)

Luján is a village and municipality in San Luis Province in central Argentina.
