= Arizona, San Luis =

Coordinates: 35°43′S 65°18′W

Arizona
- Municipality and village
- Interactive map of Arizona
- Country: Argentina
- Province: San Luis
- Department: Gobernador Dupuy
- Time zone: UTC−3 (ART)

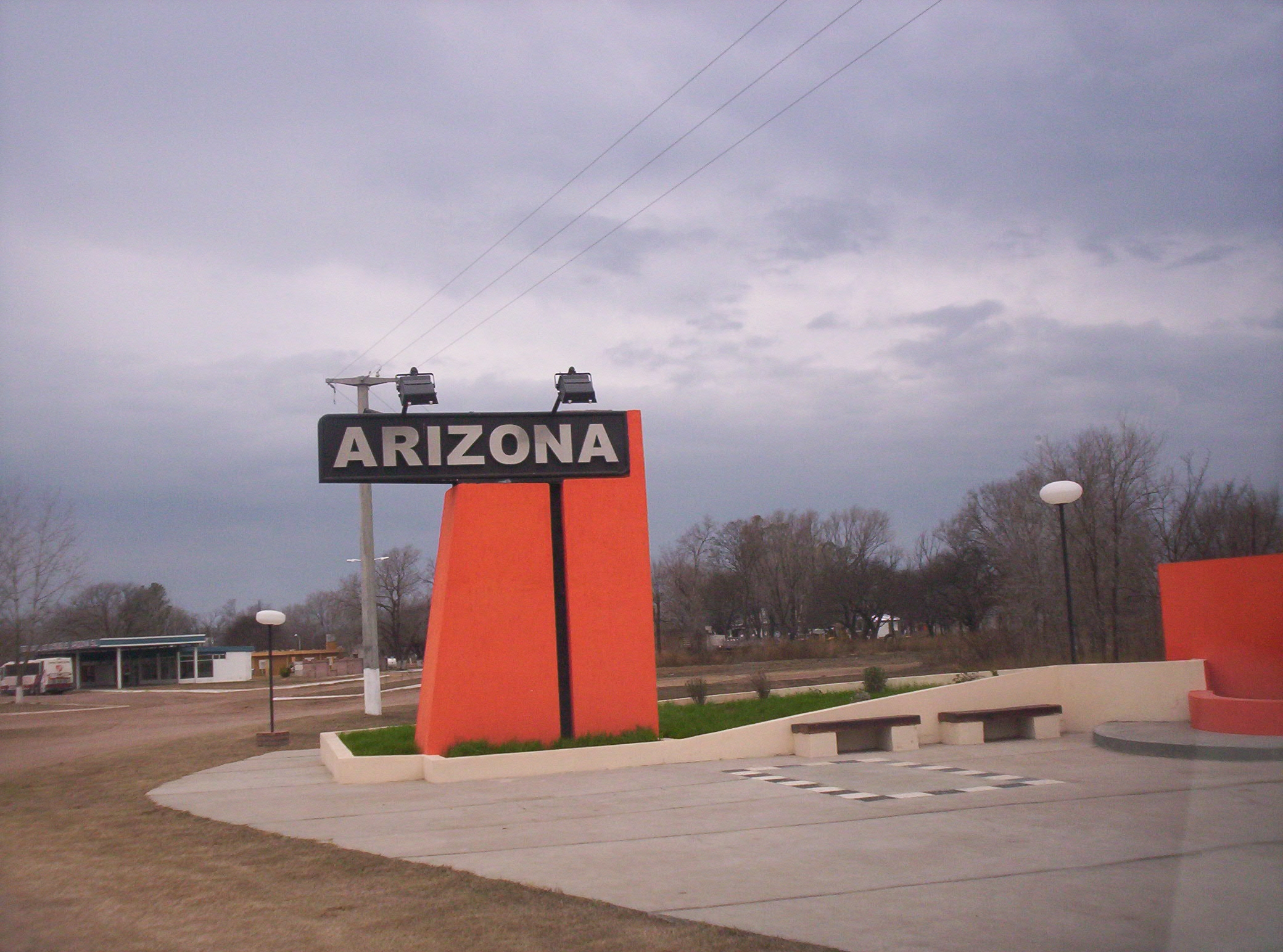
Entrance to Arizona

Arizona is a village and municipality in San Luis Province in central Argentina.
