= Unión, San Luis =

- Municipality and village
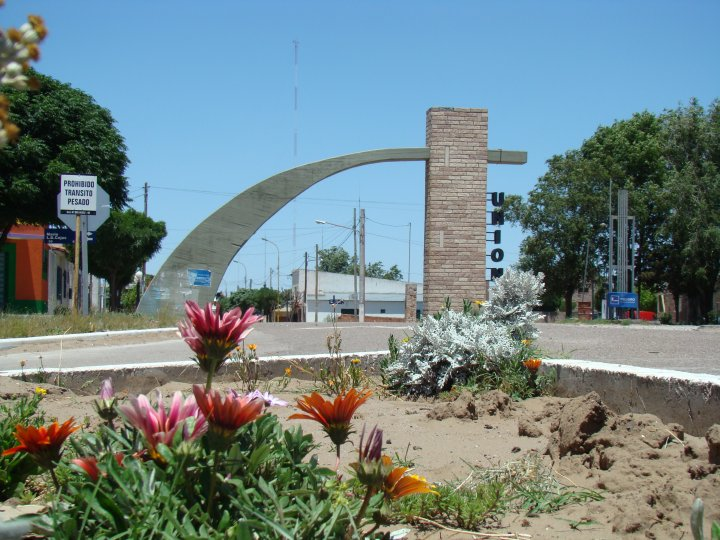

- Location within San Luis Province Location within Argentina Location within South America
- Coordinates: 35°09′11″S 65°56′49″W
- Country: Argentina
- Province: San Luis
- Department: Gobernador Dupuy
- Founded: 24 November 1910
- Founder: Wüst family

Government
  - Intendant: Julian Roberto Bealals
- Elevation: 1,007 ft (307 m)

Population (2010 census)
  - Total: 2,462
- Demonyms: unionense
- Time zone: UTC−3 (ART)
- CPA base: D6216
- Website: Official website

Unión is a village and municipality in San Luis Province, Argentina, it is located at the intersection of National Route 188 and Provincial Route 3, in the southern of the province.

== Transport ==
=== Highways ===
==== National Route 188 ====
National Route 188 connects Unión to General Alvear, 162 km (101 mi) to the west, and Realicó, 156 km (97 mi) to the east.

==== Provincial Route 3 ====
Provincial Route 3 connects Unión to San Luis City, 230 km (140 mi) to the north, and La Pampa Province, 101 km (63 mi) to the south.

=== Unión train station ===
Unión had a railway station opened in 1907 and abandoned in 1977.
