= Alto Pencoso =

- Village
- Interactive map of Alto Pencoso
- Coordinates: 33.43°S 66.93°W
- Country: Argentina
- Province: San Luis Province
- Department: La Capital
- Founded: 1883

Government
  - Type: City commission government
  - Commission President: Oscar Salvador Baigorria (Union and Liberty Party)
- Elevation: 2,170 ft (660 m)

Population (2001)
  - Total: 244
- Time zone: UTC−3 (ART)
- Post code: D5724
- Area Code: 02657

Alto Pencoso is a village and municipality in San Luis Province in central Argentina.
