= San Gerónimo, San Luis =

Coordinates: 33°08′S 66°31′W

San Gerónimo
- Municipality and village
- Interactive map of San Gerónimo
- Country: Argentina
- Province: San Luis
- Department: Juan Martín de Pueyrredón
- Time zone: UTC−3 (ART)

San Gerónimo is a village and municipality in San Luis Province in central Argentina.
