= Papagayos =

Coordinates: 32.767°S 65.383°W

- village
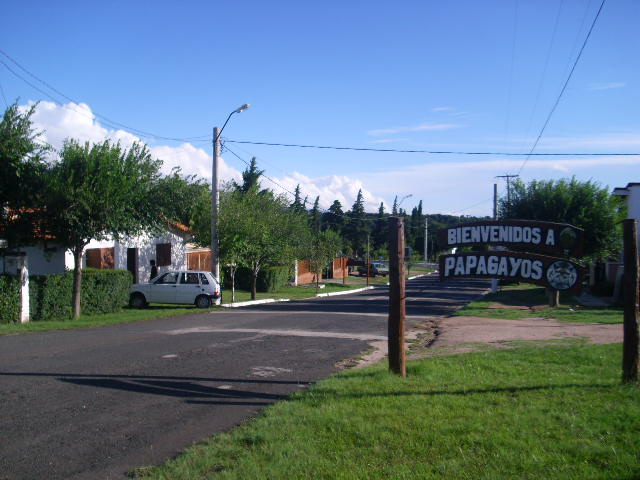
- Interactive map of Papagayos
- Established: 1902

Government
  - Intendente: José Luis Gauna, Movimiento Nacional y Popular
- Time zone: UTC−3 (ART)
- Website: www.papagayos.gov.ar

Papagayos is a village in Chacabuco Department, San Luis Province, Argentina. Among the small towns that are at the feet of the Comechingones Mountains, Papagayos stands out by its particular landscape of caranday palms.

It borders Villa Larca to the north, Tilisarao to the west, Villa del Carmen to the south and to the east, Córdoba Province.

It has around 750 inhabitants. Its climate is mainly dry with a little summer precipitation.

== Toponymy ==
There are two theories about Papagayos' name. Some people affirm that it derives from papa-gallo, the name the natives gave to a wild medicinal plant. Another theory says that it may be a confusion of the colonists, calling the burrowing parakeet (Cyanoliseus patagonus) that they found in the zone by that name.

== Gallery ==
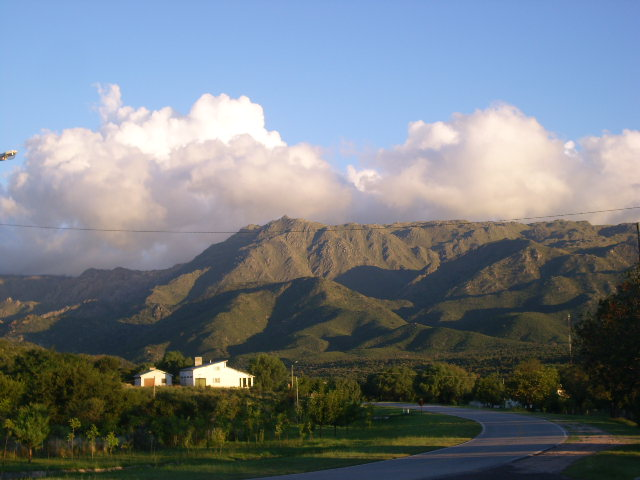
Sunset

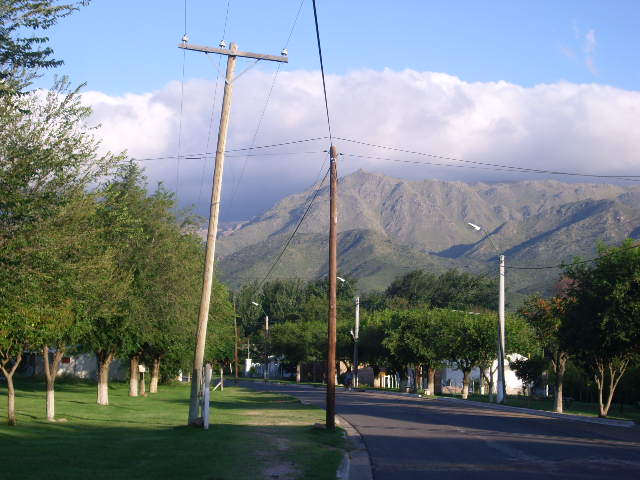
Village

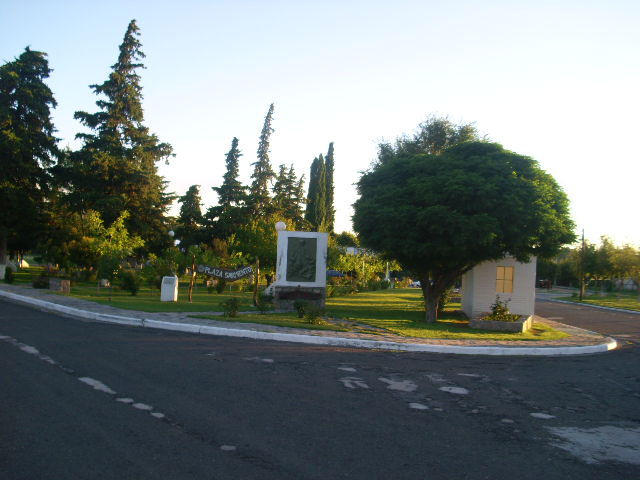
Square

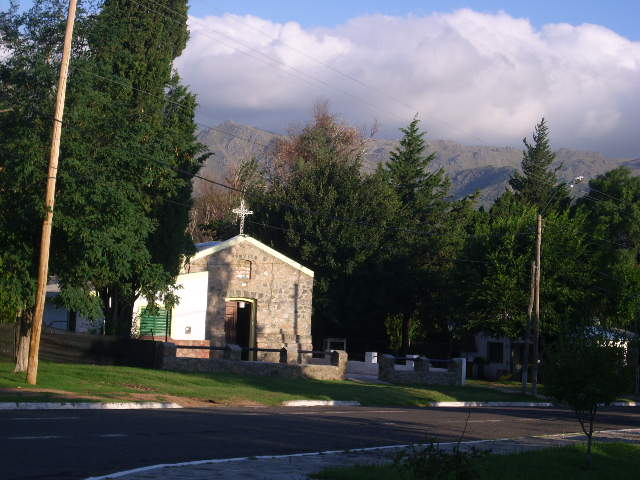
Church of San Pedro

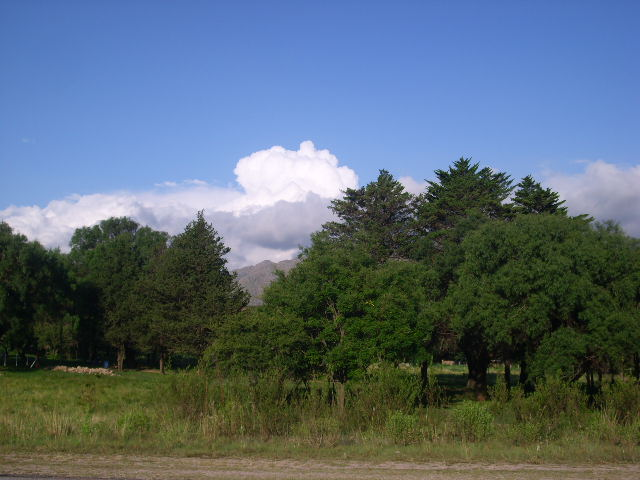
Landscape

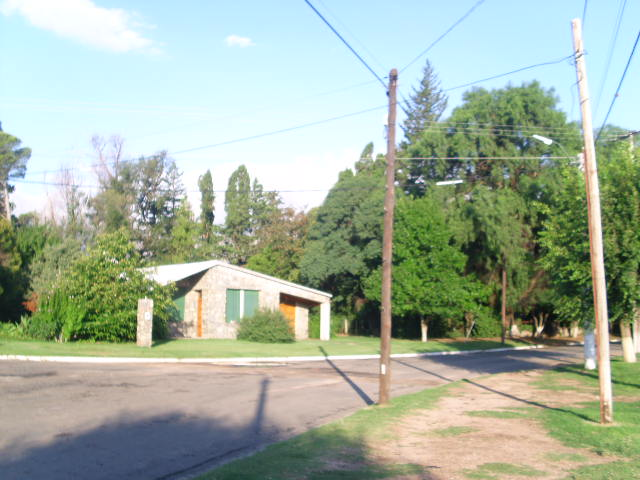
Stone house

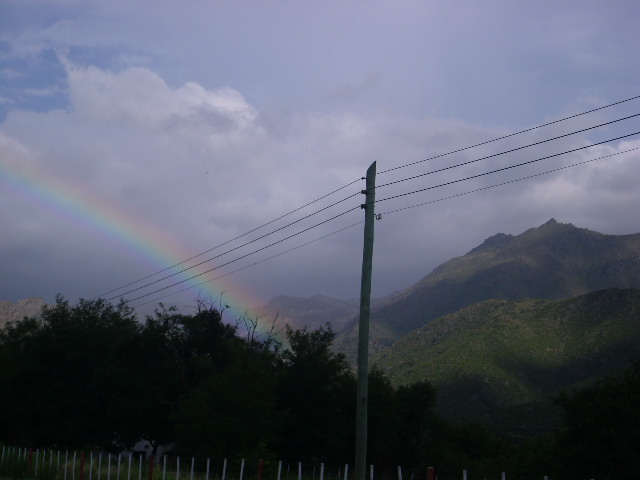
Cerro Negro with a visitor

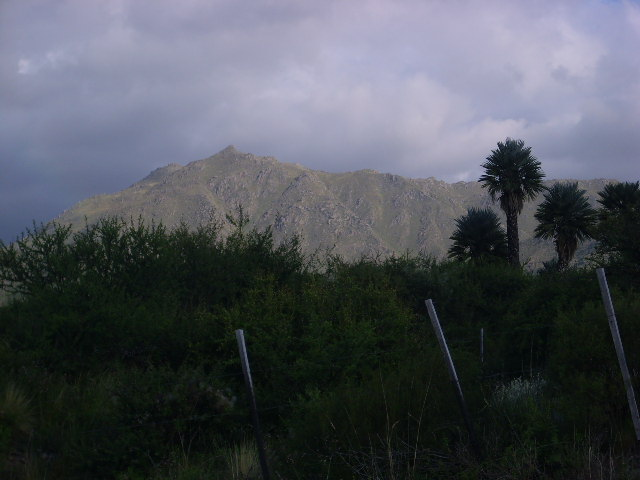
Cerro Negro

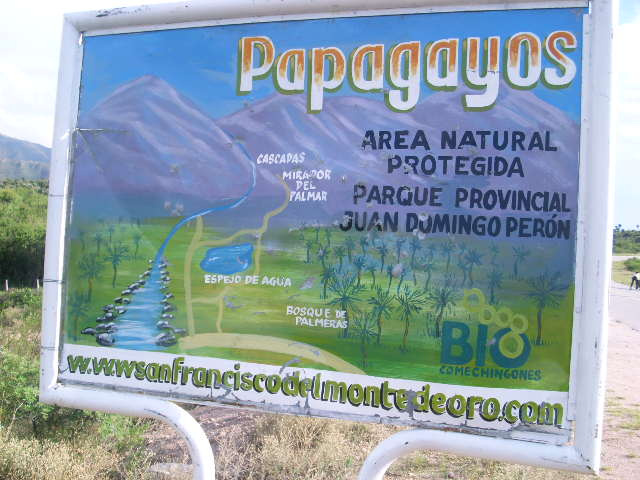
Protected area

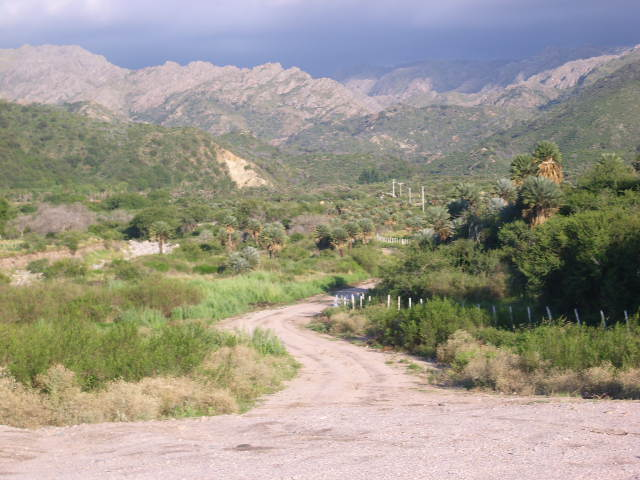
Towards the brook

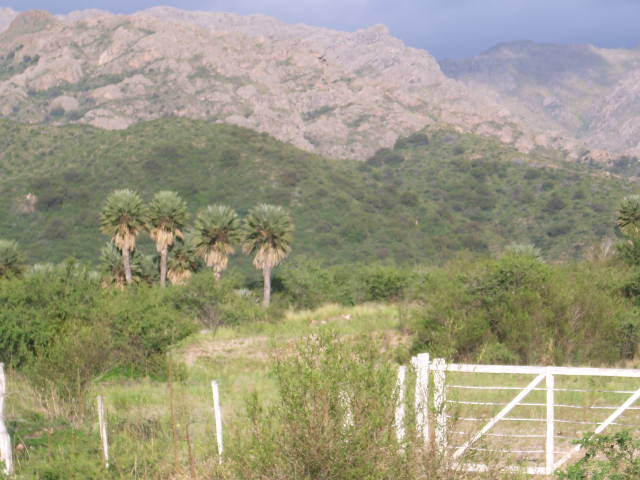
Four lookouts

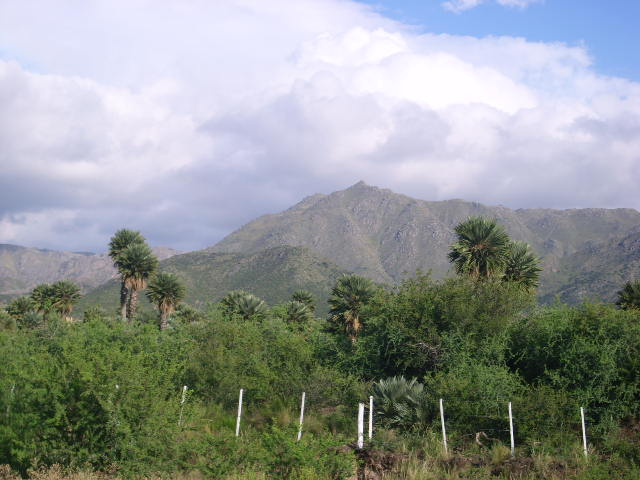
Landscape with caranday palms
