= La Calera, San Luis =

La Calera
- Municipality and village
- Location within Argentina
- Coordinates: 32°52′39″S 66°50′37″W
- Country: Argentina
- Province: San Luis Province
- Department: Belgrano
- Time zone: UTC−3 (ART)

La Calera is a village and municipality in San Luis Province in central Argentina.
