= Pedernera =

Pedernera is a surname. Notable people with the surname include:

- Adolfo Pedernera (1918–1995), Argentine footballer
- Juan Esteban Pedernera (1796–1886), Argentine general and interim President of Argentina

== See also ==
- General Pedernera Department, is a department of San Luis Province, Argentina
- Gimnasia y Esgrima y Pedernera Unidos, is a sports club from San Luis, Argentina
