= Zanjitas =

Coordinates: 33°48′S 66°26′W

- Municipality and village
- Interactive map of Zanjitas
- Country: Argentina
- Province: San Luis
- Department: Juan Martín de Pueyrredón
- Established: May 13, 1910

Government
  - Type: Local municipal commission
- Elevation: 560 ft (170 m)

Population (2022 census)
  - Total: 352
- Time zone: UTC−3 (ART)

Zanjitas is a village and municipality in San Luis Province in central Argentina.
