= Villa Larca =

Coordinates: 32°37′S 64°59′W

Villa Larca Larca
- Municipality and village
- Interactive map of Villa Larca
- Country: Argentina
- Province: San Luis Province
- Elevation: 1,046 m (3,432 ft)
- Time zone: UTC−3 (ART)
- Postal code: 5883

Villa Larca is a village and municipality of the Chacabuco Department in San Luis Province in central Argentina.

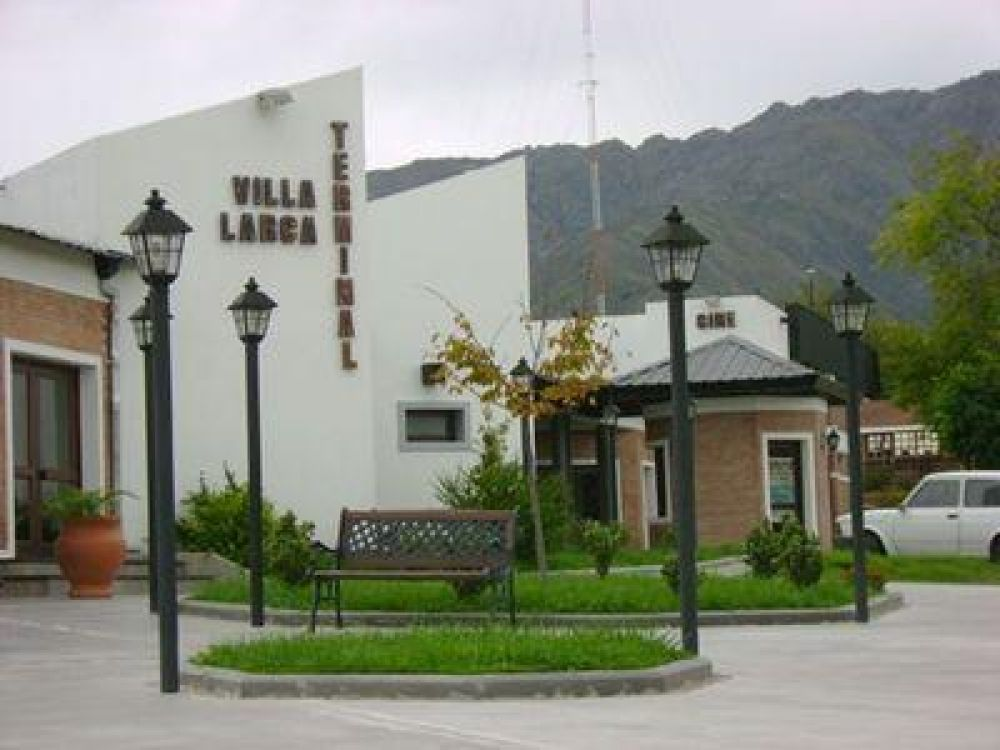
Villa Larca bus station with the Comechingones mountains behind.

The village it's located at the foot of the Comechingones mountains, and has a primary and secondary school, as well as a bus station and a public library.

== History ==
It is believed that Villa Larca was already inhabited at the beginning of the XVIII century. The village foundation, however, was made official on the 22 of June of 1858.

There are many claims on the origin of the word "Larca ", on one hand, it means "canal", of those which are used to carry water for irrigation. On the other hand, it is said that existed the "Larca cacique" ancient chief of the Comechingones tribes, living in the region around the year 1595.

== Notable people ==
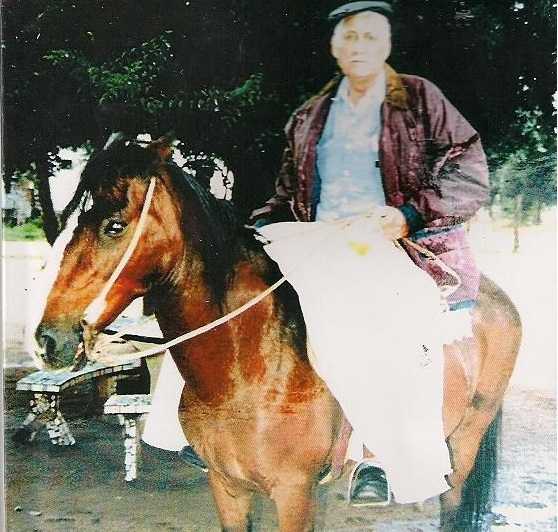
Cosme Nievas riding a horse

- Cosme Nievas (1927-2010), former mayor during the last decades of the XX century. He was born in Pozo del Algarrobo, 15 km from Villa Larca. He started working from the age of 9 after losing his mother. Often worked along the rest of the workers, due to the low monetary resources of the village. Solved a great deeds problem of the inhabitants of Villa Larca, and managed to get the first permanent doctor. He is affectionately remembered as an honest person.
