= Juan Martín de Pueyrredón Department =

Juan Martín de Pueyrredón
- Department
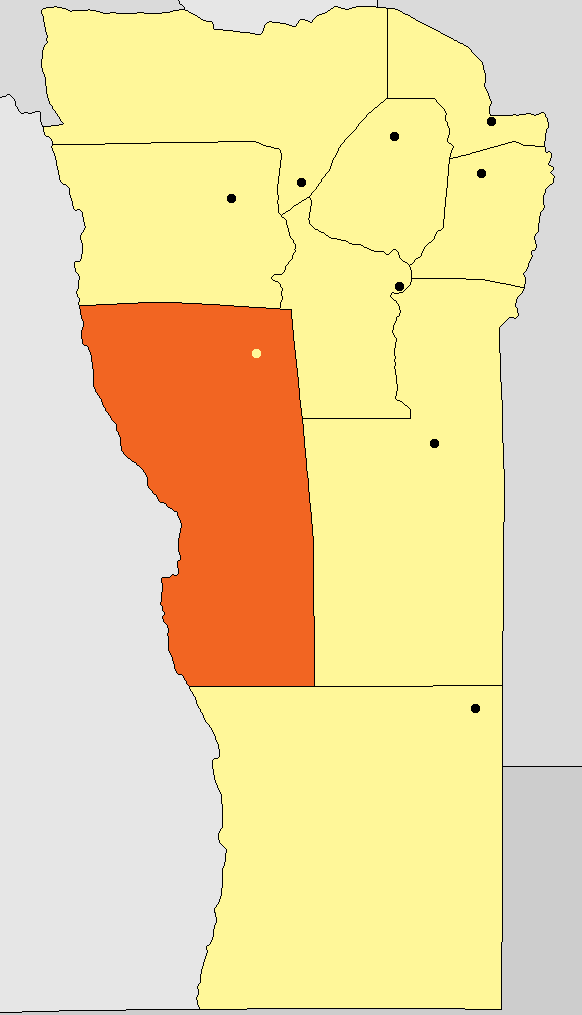
- Location of Juan Martín de Pueyrredón Department in San Luis Province
- Coordinates: 33°18′S 66°20′W
- Country: Argentina
- Province: San Luis
- Seat: San Luis

Population
  - Total: 168,771

Juan Martín de Pueyrredón is a department of the province of San Luis, Argentina. Its headtown is the city of San Luis, which is also the largest and capital city of the province of San Luis.

With an area of 13,120 km^{2} (5,066 sq mi) it borders to the north with Belgrano Department, to the east with Coronel Pringles, to the south with Gobernador Dupuy, and to the west with Mendoza Province.

Until 2010, as per Law #V-0106-2004 (5490) its name was La Capital Department (Spanish: Departamento La Capital) but according to law #V-0748-2010, the name has been changed to Juan Martín de Pueyrredón.

== Municipalities ==
- Alto Pelado
- Alto Pencoso
- Balde
- Beazley
- Cazador
- Chosmes
- El Volcán
- Jarilla
- Juana Koslay
- La Punta
- Mosmota
- Potrero de los Funes
- Salinas del Bebedero
- San Gerónimo
- San Luis
- Zanjitas

== Villages ==
- Alto Blanco
- Buena Vista
- Charlone
- Colonia Santa Virginia
- Donado
- Donovan
- El Lechuza
- El Portezuelo
- El Recuerdo
- Las Barrancas
- Gorgonta
- Huejeda
- La Irene
- La Seña
- La Soledad
- Las Gamas
- Los Puquios
- Mataco
- Paso de las Vacas
- Pescadores
- Pozo del Carril
- Punta del Cerro
- San Martín del Alto Negro
- Santa Rosa
- Suyuque Nuevo
- Suyuque Viejo
- Varela
- Villa Pascua
