= Alto Pelado =

- Village
- Interactive map of Alto Pelado
- Coordinates: 33.83°S 66.15°W
- Country: Argentina
- Province: San Luis Province
- Department: La Capital
- Founded: 1908

Government
  - Type: City commission government
  - Commission President: Carla Mabel Ferrero (Justicialist Party)
- Elevation: 560 ft (170 m)

Population (2001)
  - Total: 803
- Time zone: UTC−3 (ART)
- Post code: D5721
- Area Code: 02657

Alto Pelado is a village and municipality in San Luis Province in central Argentina. It's known in the region for hosting the Pampas Deer Festival.
