= Villa Reynolds =

Town in San Luis Province, Argentina

Coordinates: 33°44′S 65°23′W

Villa Reynolds is a military town in the General Pedernera Department on the San Luis Province, Argentina, closely associated with the Villa Reynolds Air Base. It is the home of the V Air Brigade of Argentine Air Force. In March 1973 two Skylark sounding rockets were launched from this location.

== Climate ==
Villa Reynolds has a humid subtropical climate (Cfa) with long, hot summers and short, cool winters.

Climate data for Villa Reynolds (1991–2020, extremes 1961–present)
Month	Jan	Feb	Mar	Apr	May	Jun	Jul	Aug	Sep	Oct	Nov	Dec	Year
Record high °C (°F)	42.2 (108.0)	42.6 (108.7)	38.8 (101.8)	35.8 (96.4)	34.4 (93.9)	31.6 (88.9)	36.0 (96.8)	37.8 (100.0)	38.0 (100.4)	43.0 (109.4)	41.0 (105.8)	44.1 (111.4)	44.1 (111.4)
Mean daily maximum °C (°F)	31.2 (88.2)	29.8 (85.6)	28.0 (82.4)	24.0 (75.2)	20.3 (68.5)	17.7 (63.9)	17.1 (62.8)	20.2 (68.4)	22.6 (72.7)	25.2 (77.4)	28.1 (82.6)	30.6 (87.1)	24.6 (76.3)
Daily mean °C (°F)	23.3 (73.9)	21.6 (70.9)	19.5 (67.1)	15.3 (59.5)	11.4 (52.5)	8.0 (46.4)	7.0 (44.6)	9.7 (49.5)	13.1 (55.6)	16.9 (62.4)	20.0 (68.0)	22.5 (72.5)	15.7 (60.3)
Mean daily minimum °C (°F)	15.5 (59.9)	14.3 (57.7)	12.6 (54.7)	8.7 (47.7)	4.9 (40.8)	1.0 (33.8)	−0.3 (31.5)	1.5 (34.7)	4.6 (40.3)	8.9 (48.0)	11.9 (53.4)	14.3 (57.7)	8.2 (46.8)
Record low °C (°F)	3.4 (38.1)	1.8 (35.2)	−5.0 (23.0)	−8.5 (16.7)	−10.2 (13.6)	−12.0 (10.4)	−14.6 (5.7)	−13.1 (8.4)	−13.6 (7.5)	−4.7 (23.5)	−4.6 (23.7)	0.6 (33.1)	−14.6 (5.7)
Average precipitation mm (inches)	102.8 (4.05)	89.8 (3.54)	96.2 (3.79)	68.9 (2.71)	31.7 (1.25)	9.8 (0.39)	10.5 (0.41)	15.6 (0.61)	35.4 (1.39)	65.8 (2.59)	92.4 (3.64)	105.4 (4.15)	724.3 (28.52)
Average precipitation days (≥ 0.1 mm)	9.3	8.4	8.5	6.4	4.7	2.6	3.0	3.0	5.0	8.6	9.7	10.1	79.3
Average snowy days	0.0	0.0	0.0	0.0	0.1	0.2	0.4	0.1	0.1	0.0	0.0	0.0	0.8
Average relative humidity (%)	66.9	72.1	75.1	75.9	77.4	75.0	70.8	63.3	60.9	63.0	62.0	62.1	68.7
Mean monthly sunshine hours	279.0	237.3	229.4	183.0	164.3	156.0	179.8	195.0	210.0	229.4	261.0	285.2	2,609.4
Mean daily sunshine hours	9.0	8.4	7.4	6.1	5.3	5.2	5.8	6.5	7.0	7.4	8.7	9.2	7.2
Percentage possible sunshine	67	68	59	60	56	55	54	60	59	60	64	62	60
Source 1: Servicio Meteorológico Nacional
Source 2: NOAA (percent sun 1961–1990)
