= Saladillo =

Saladillo may refer to:

- Saladillo, Buenos Aires, a town in Buenos Aires Province, Argentina
- Saladillo, Córdoba, a municipality in San Luis Province in Argentina
- Saladillo, San Luis, a municipality in San Luis Province in central Argentina
- Saladillo Partido, a partido of Buenos Aires Province in Argentina
- Saladillo River, a river of Argentina
- Saladillo Stream, a stream of the Paraná River, in the province of Santa Fe, Argentina
