= Cortaderas =

Coordinates: 32°30′S 65°00′W

Cortaderas Villa Elena
- Municipality and village
- Flag

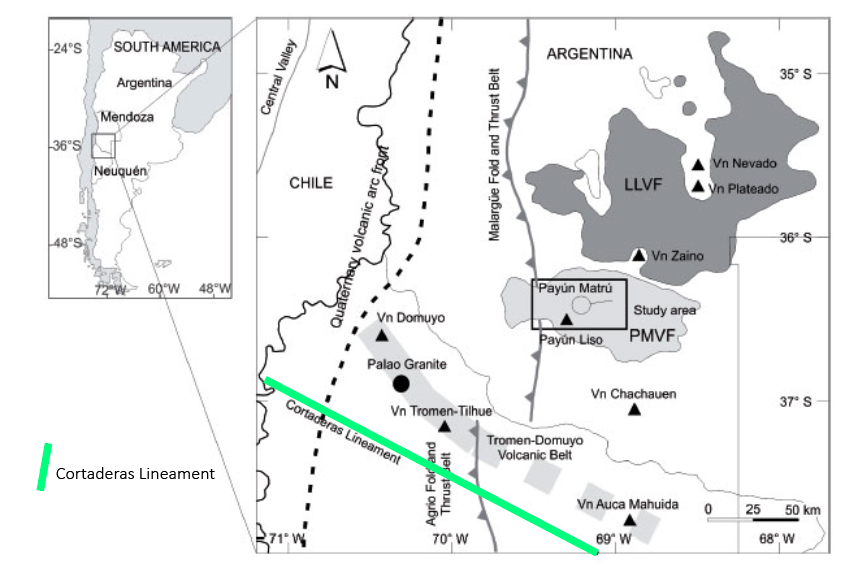
- Country: Argentina
- Province: San Luis Province
- Time zone: UTC−3 (ART)

Cortaderas is a village and municipality in the San Luis Province in central Argentina. The town is divided into two parts by Provincial Route No. 1, with the picturesque Villa Elena, the rural area La Cañada, and San Miguel on the east side; and from the west Balcarce and Cortaderas.

The town's name originates from the Spanish word cortaderas, which means sliced, because it is sliced in half by the Provincial Route No. 1, with the neighborhoods of Balcarce, Malvinas Argentinas, and Cortaderas on the west side of the highway, and the neighborhoods of Villa Elena, San Miguel and La Canada on the east side of the route. The Natural Reserve Quebrada de Villa Elena is a notable national park of Argentina, and it is situated to the east of the town. Cortaderas city is one of the pathways of getting into the forest park.

== Population ==
As of the 2010 INDEC Census, with data collected from all of the areas within the village limits, there are 822 residents of the municipality. This population figure reflects an increase of 161, or 24%, from the number counted in the 2001 INDEC Census. These figures include the entire national park of Villa Elena.
