= Batavia, San Luis =

Coordinates: 34°47′S 65°41′W

Batavia (San Luis)
- Municipality and village
- Interactive map of Batavia (San Luis)
- Country: Argentina
- Province: San Luis Province
- Time zone: UTC−3 (ART)

Batavia (San Luis) is a village and municipality in San Luis Province in central Argentina.
