= La Majada, San Luis =

Coordinates: 32°32′S 66°06′W

La Majada (San Luis)
- Municipality and village
- Interactive map of La Majada (San Luis)
- Country: Argentina
- Province: San Luis Province
- Time zone: UTC−3 (ART)

La Majada (San Luis) is a village and municipality in San Luis Province in central Argentina.
