= El Trapiche, San Luis =

Coordinates: 33°07′S 66°05′W

El Trapiche (San Luis)
- Municipality and village
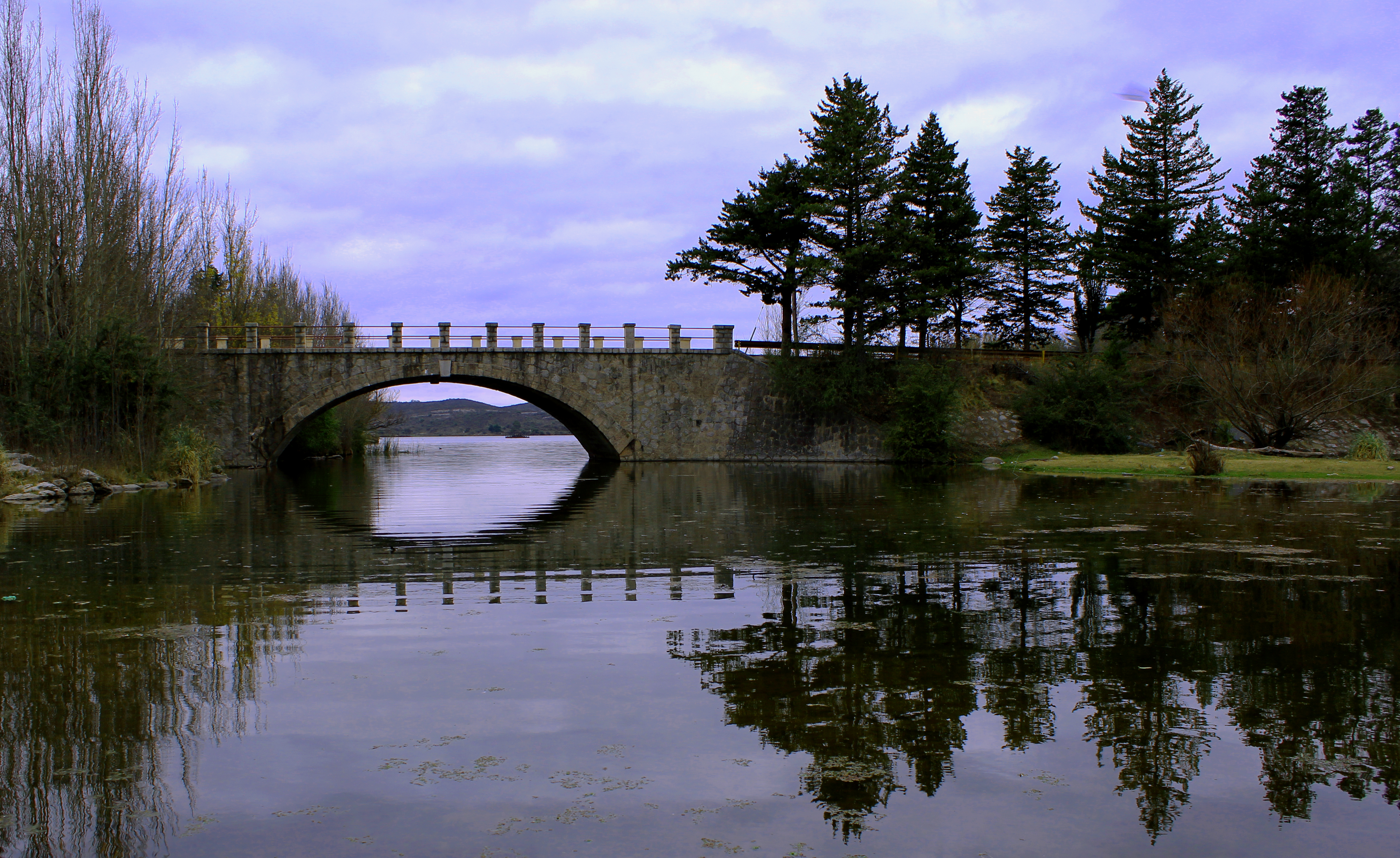
- Puente La Salada, El Trapiche
- Interactive map of El Trapiche (San Luis)
- Country: Argentina
- Province: San Luis
- Time zone: UTC−3 (ART)

El Trapiche is a village and municipality in San Luis Province, located in central Argentina. It is found 31 kilometres (19 mi) north east of the city of San Luis.
