= Navia, San Luis =

Coordinates: 34°47′S 66°35′W

Navia (San Luis)
- Municipality and village
- Interactive map of Navia (San Luis)
- Country: Argentina
- Province: San Luis Province
- Time zone: UTC−3 (ART)

Navia (San Luis) is a village and municipality in San Luis Province in central Argentina.
