= La Punilla =

Coordinates: 33°08′S 65°05′W

- Municipality and village
- Interactive map of La Punilla
- Country: Argentina
- Province: San Luis Province

La Punilla is a village and municipality in San Luis Province in central Argentina.
