= Las Chacras, San Luis =

Coordinates: 32°33′S 65°47′W

Las Chacras (San Martín)
- Municipality and village
- Interactive map of Las Chacras (San Martín)
- Country: Argentina
- Province: San Luis Province
- Time zone: UTC−3 (ART)

Las Chacras (San Martín) is a village and municipality in San Luis Province in central Argentina.

== Demographics ==
demographic vertical bar chart of between 1960 and 2010
