= Juan Llerena, San Luis =

Coordinates: 33°16′S 65°37′W

Juan Llerena (San Luis)
- Municipality and village
- Interactive map of Juan Llerena (San Luis)
- Country: Argentina
- Province: San Luis Province

Juan Llerena (San Luis) is a village and municipality in San Luis Province in central Argentina.
