= Maria Carla Alvarez =

Argentine cyclist

Personal information
- Full name: Maria Carla Alvarez
- Born: 17 September 1984 (age 42) Buenos Aires, Argentina

Cycling career
- Sport: Cycling
- Current team: Retired
- Discipline: Road
- Role: Rider

Professional team
- 2015–2016: Xirayas de San Luis

Maria Carla Alvarez (born 17 September 1984) is an Argentine former professional racing cyclist. In 2009 and 2016, she was the winner of the Argentine National Road Race Championships.

== Major results ==
2003
National Road Championships

2nd Time trial
3rd Road race

2004
3rd Time trial, National Road Championships
2005
2nd Time trial, National Road Championships
2008
2nd Time trial, National Road Championships
2009
1st Road race, National Road Championships
2011
2nd Time trial, National Road Championships
2014
2nd Time trial, National Road Championships
2015
2nd Time trial, National Road Championships
6th Overall Tour Femenino de San Luis

1st Argentine rider classification

2016
1st Road race, National Road Championships
8th Overall Tour Femenino de San Luis
