= Río Grande, San Luis =

Coordinates: 33°07′S 65°05′W

Río Grande
- Municipality and village
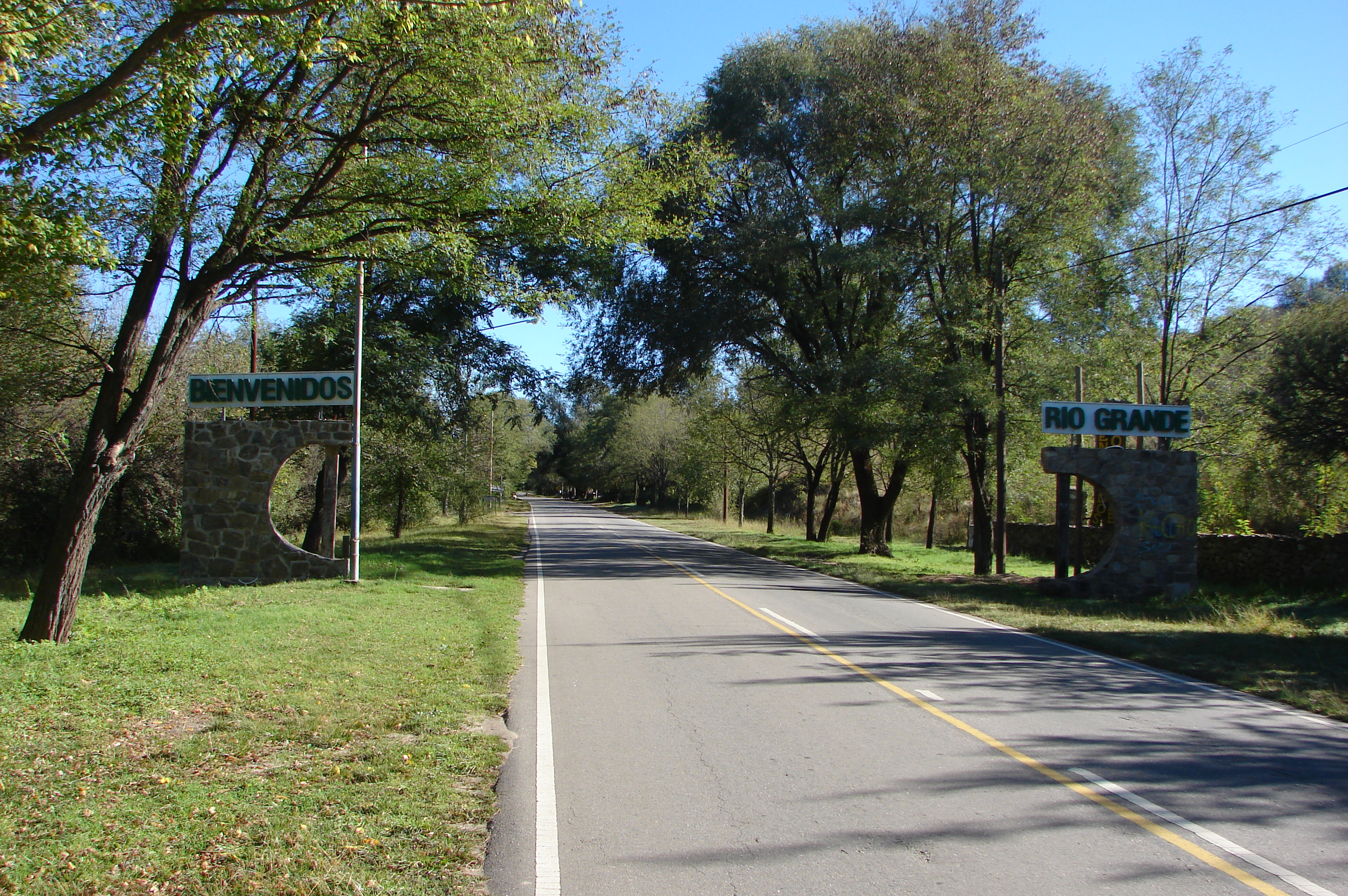
- Interactive map of Río Grande
- Country: Argentina
- Province: San Luis Province
- Time zone: UTC−3 (ART)

Río Grande is a village and municipality in San Luis Province in central Argentina.
