= Leandro N. Alem, San Luis =

Coordinates: 32°29′S 66°03′W

Leandro N. Alem (San Luis)
- Municipality and village
- Interactive map of Leandro N. Alem (San Luis)
- Country: Argentina
- Province: San Luis Province
- Time zone: UTC−3 (ART)

Leandro N. Alem (San Luis) is a village and municipality in San Luis Province in central Argentina.
