= Candelaria, San Luis =

Coordinates: 32°04′S 65°49′W

Candelaria (San Luis)
- Municipality and village
- Interactive map of Candelaria (San Luis)
- Country: Argentina
- Province: San Luis Province
- Time zone: UTC−3 (ART)

Candelaria (San Luis) is a village and municipality in San Luis Province in central Argentina.
