= Juan Jorba =

Coordinates: 33°37′S 65°16′W

- Municipality and village
- Interactive map of Juan Jorba
- Country: Argentina
- Province: San Luis Province
- Time zone: UTC−3 (ART)

Juan Jorba is a village and municipality in San Luis Province in central Argentina.
