= Justo Daract, San Luis =

Justo Daract
- City
- Location in Argentina
- Coordinates: 33°52′S 65°10′W
- Country: Argentina
- Province: San Luis
- Department: General Pedernera
- Founded: March 10, 1907
- Founder: Juan Martín Albizú

Government
  - Mayor: Alfredo Domínguez (PJ)
- Elevation: 403 m (1,322 ft)

Population (2010 census)
  - Total: 12,135
- Demonym: Daractense
- Time zone: UTC−3 (ART)
- CPA Base: D 5738
- Area code: +54 2657

Justo Daract is the fifth most important city in the province of San Luis, Argentina. It is located in the oriental area of Cuyo, a few kilometers away from the border of the province of Córdoba, across the National Route 7, which links Buenos Aires to Mendoza and Santiago de Chile. It was named after the first constitutional governor of the province of San Luis, Don Justo Daract.

== History ==
=== Indigenous peoples ===
The first inhabitants of the present-day area of Justo Daract were Huarpes from the tribe of the "Michilingües." The first Spanish colonizers established alliances with the indigenous people from the area. A colonizer named Juan Gómez Isleño, married the Michilingüe princess Arozena Koslay. Arozena received a catholic baptism in order to marry and she was renamed "Juana Koslay." Other colonizers followed their lead and married indigenous women, constituting the first mixed-race families from the province of San Luis. The royal government recognized Juana Koslay and Juan Gómez Isleño in 1594 as the rightful owners of the present-day Justo Daract area. But with the passing of time, the indigenous populations were expelled and the area became public property.

=== First landowners ===
After expelling the indigenous peoples, the government of the province granted lands located to the South of the present-day city of Villa Mercedes to military chiefs from the Border Troops (Fuerzas de Fronteras). An Act granting lands to the chiefs was issued in 1858. The provincial government sold 1600 square blocks, cataloged as lot “A”, to José Parellada, who was not a military chief but bought the lands as a real estate investment. He named his property “La Esquina” (Spanish for “The Corner”), thus, this can be considered the first name of Justo Daract. In 1874, Parellada sold this property to Wenceslao Paunero.

The provincial government granted another 1600 square blocks, cataloged as lot “B”, to Juana Larice, who inherited the land from her husband Apolinario Moreno, a military chief. Juana Larice also sold her land to Wenceslao Paunero fifty-four days after Parellada did, but as she could not read or write and she was not a good deal maker, Paunero took advantage of this and paid her 800 pesos less than he paid Parellada. Lot “C”, the last 1600 square blocks, was supposed to be granted to Primitivo Capdevila, but he did not register the lands to his name and instead donated them to Wenceslao Paunero in 1878. Through this procedure, the three lots were unified and Paunero became the only owner of the present-day area of Justo Daract. In 1904, Paunero changed the name “La Esquina” to “La Esperanza” (Spanish for “The Hope”), which can be considered the second name of Justo Daract. On August the 14th of 1904 a clever British merchant called Ludwig Bewig bought “La Esperanza” from Wenceslao Paunero and his heirs. The new property deed that resulted from the transaction added 492 hectares to the lands. Despite the fact that Bewig only owned the lands for one year, he is also considered one of the first landowners of Justo Daract. At this point in history, the lands were uninhabited and there were no plans to build a railway station. On June the 12th of 1905 the Basque merchant Juan Martín Albisú and his brothers bought the lands from Bewig.

=== Founding ===
The 10th of March 1907 can be considered the founding date of Justo Daract, as that day the Albisú's lands were sold off on a public auction conducted by Arturo Echegaray and the area became known as Colony and Town Juan Martín Albisú. Albisú realized the importance the lands would acquire with the construction of two railway branch lines from the main network of the Buenos Aires and Pacific Railway, a British company, which was later nationalized and renamed General San Martín Railway. The lines would link Bahía Blanca, in the province of Buenos Aires, with La Paz, in the province of Mendoza. A railway station, identified as “Kilometer 650”, was built in the colony in 1910. This station joins lines coming from Paunero and Villa Valeria, two towns from the province of Córdoba; the lines are headed to Villa Mercedes, in the province of San Luis. In 1910, the station was named “Justo Daract” and due to the importance the station acquired after the installation of the telegraph and the telephone, the colony adopted its name, paying homage to the first constitutional governor of San Luis.

=== Railway ===
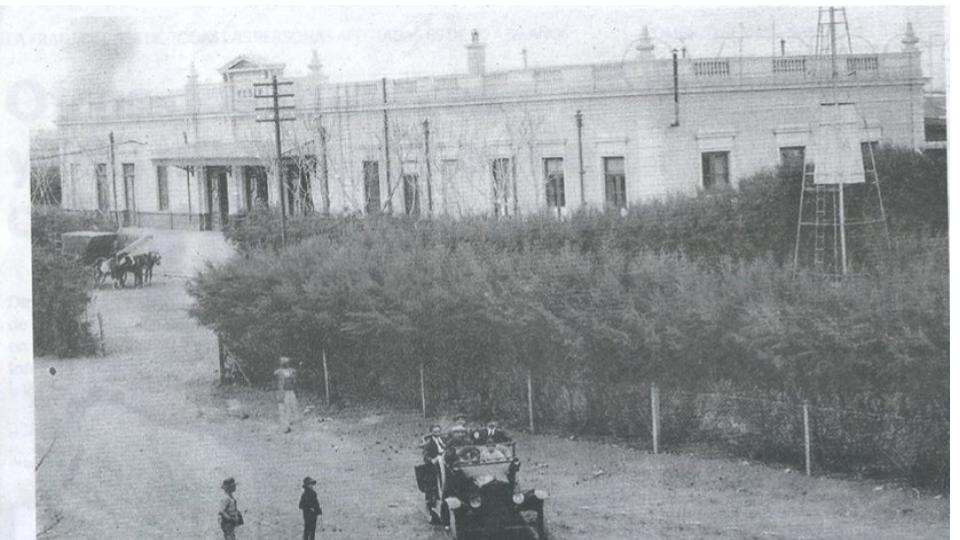
First picture of the Railway Station of Justo Daract, San Luis

Due to branch lines centralization, workshops from Villa Mercedes were moved to the new station in Justo Daract. New railway branch lines were built and workers and merchants started settling in the town, seeing a bright future ahead. Hotels, boarding houses, restaurants, and new houses were built around the station.

The building of the “Cañada Verde” bridge and the railway line to Villa Valeria produced a strong demand for labor and this allowed an expansion of trade. There was a huge demand for bricks to build railway-related buildings and houses for the first inhabitants so, a brick kiln (an oven to make bricks) from the Grosso company was built.

Moreover, in the late 1907, a bridge over Río Quinto that linked Justo Daract with the railway station “La Paz” in Mendoza was built. Around the same years, they built a new building for the railway station, repair stations for locomotives, and a construction station.

This process of property acquisition, building, and the first loading and unloading of goods created a really strong demand for labor and materials that prompted an economic and demographic growth. Consequently, the population promptly grew and rose from the eighth most populated to the third most populated town from 1914 to 1920.

Moreover, in its first fifty years since its founding, the strong railway activity made it possible for the town to have drinking water, a registry office, primary schools, a library, sports clubs, and neighborhoods with several houses.

=== First Schools and Library ===
The first provincial primary school created in the town was school No. 107, located in Villa Salles, on July 21, 1910. In January 1914 the first public library was founded, which was named “Domingo Faustino Sarmiento.”

The first secondary school, which is called Jesús Obrero Technical School, was established on March 15, 1949, and even today it is the one where most students enroll.

=== The Chapel ===
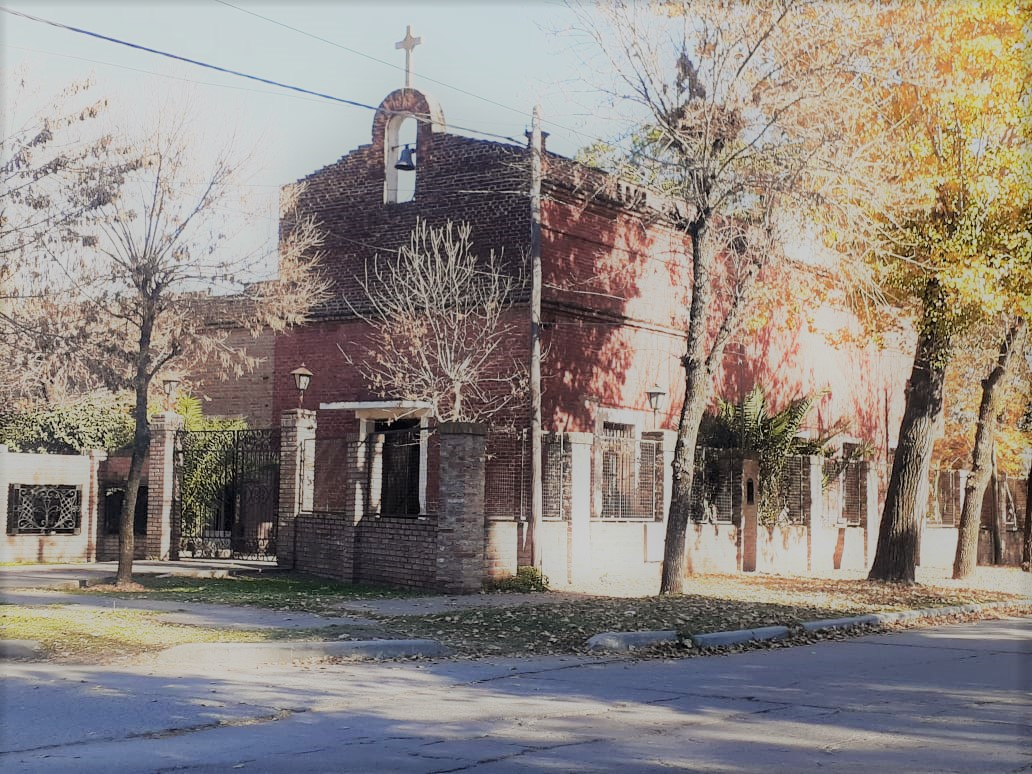
First church of the town

The town's inhabitants had long been devout followers of the Roman Catholic Church, and thus the parishioners offered their own houses as venues for religious ceremonies before any chapel was built.

The construction of the chapel began on July 8, 1934, and it was named Sagrado Corazón Chapel.

Currently, the Jesús Obrero y Nuestra Señora del Carmen Parish Church is the main religious institution of the town. It is located in the central area of the town and two other chapels are under its supervision: Nuestra Señora de Luján Chapel, located in Villa Salles, and Nuestra Señora del Rosario de San Nicolás Chapel, located in the neighborhood "La Esperanza."

== Free-trade Zone ==
In 1994, a federal act made it possible to create free-trade zones throughout the country, bringing about major benefits for foreign trade. When the creation of a free-trade zone was approved in 1996, residents were extremely happy. The town's mayor claimed that “the impact of the free-trade zone would be similar to that of the railroad in its golden age.” Locals took to the streets to celebrate the establishment of the zone, and there was a lot of optimism regarding the project. However, the free-trade zone did not generate the dramatic economic growth that was expected, as it did not become the main source of employment or income for the inhabitants.

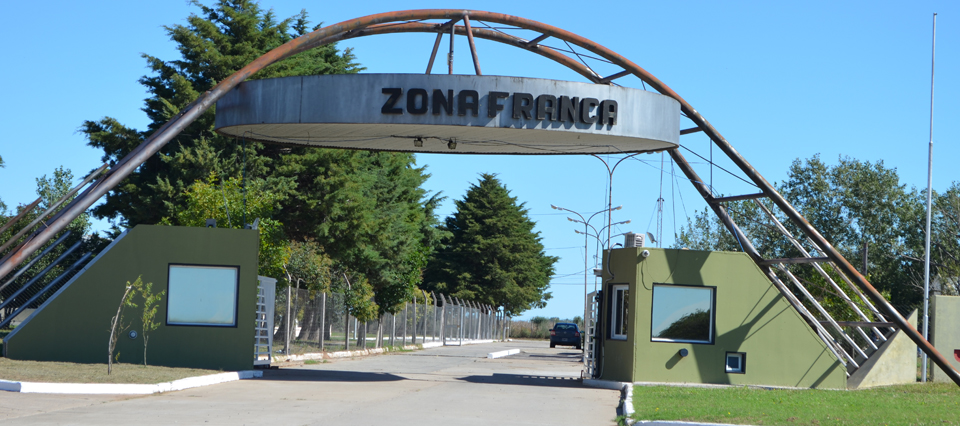
Free-trade Zone of Justo Daract

At present, the free-trade zone is an area centered around industry, commerce, and logistics, allowing goods to enter and get differential treatment regarding taxes and customs. The merchandise is stored in warehouses and gradually sent to different parts of the country, according to each company's needs.

As of early 2021, the zone had around twenty active users, including merchandise imported from Austria, China, India, and Spain.

The free-trade zone provides the following services: merchandise storing, fractionation, and handling; cargo loading and unloading; available land, suitable for industrial development and the construction of warehouses; tax-free electricity, running water, and natural gas.

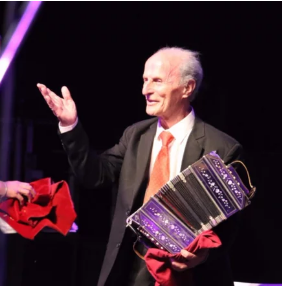
Américo Moroso, a famous bandondeon player born in Justo Daract

== Tango Festivals ==
From 2005 to 2017 Justo Daract hosted the “International Tango Festival,” an event that usually featured dancers, singers, and an orchestra. There were also traditional dishes.

In 2018, the town hosted the “Festival de Tango Puntano.”

== Economy ==
During the nineties, the process of privatization had a massive impact on the population, who worked at the railway station. Afterward, the development of industry brought about economic benefits, but the economy fell into recession and only a few of those businesses remain today.

Nowadays, Justo Daract's economy is mainly based on agriculture and small and medium industries, many of which are derived from agriculture. Furthermore, there is a free-trade zone in the town.

== Climate ==
Justo Daract has a Mediterranean climate, and it is also very windy.

Towards the south, there is Quinto River (Spanish: Río Quinto), a nearby river that was a tourist spot, but it is currently very polluted.

Climate data for Justo Daract
Month	Jan	Feb	Mar	Apr	May	Jun	Jul	Aug	Sep	Oct	Nov	Dec	Year
Mean daily maximum °F (°C)	87.8 (31.0)	86.0 (30.0)	82.4 (28.0)	75.2 (24.0)	68.0 (20.0)	62.6 (17.0)	62.6 (17.0)	68.0 (20.0)	71.6 (22.0)	77.0 (25.0)	82.4 (28.0)	86.0 (30.0)	75.8 (24.3)
Mean daily minimum °F (°C)	59.0 (15.0)	57.2 (14.0)	55.4 (13.0)	46.4 (8.0)	39.2 (4.0)	33.8 (1.0)	32.0 (0.0)	35.6 (2.0)	39.2 (4.0)	48.2 (9.0)	53.6 (12.0)	57.2 (14.0)	46.4 (8.0)
Average precipitation inches (mm)	4.25 (107.9)	3.37 (85.7)	3.72 (94.6)	2.17 (55.0)	1.12 (28.4)	0.36 (9.2)	0.73 (18.5)	0.67 (17.1)	1.39 (35.2)	2.31 (58.8)	3.38 (85.9)	4.45 (113.1)	27.92 (709.4)
Source: Servicio Meteorológico Nacional. Data from the reference period 1981-2010

== Population ==
According to the last census, which was carried out in 2010, the town has 10,135 inhabitants. This makes Justo Daract the fifth most populated city in the province of San Luis.

demographic vertical bar chart of Justo Daract between 1947 and 1980
Source: INDEC National Census
