= Río Juan Gómez =

Coordinates: 32°36′14″S 66°05′13″W

- Municipality and village
- Interactive map of Río Juan Gómez
- Country: Argentina
- Province: San Luis Province
- Time zone: UTC−3 (ART)

Río Juan Gómez is a village and municipality in San Luis Province in central Argentina.
