= Las Vertientes, San Luis =

Coordinates: 33°17′S 64°35′W

Las Vertientes (San Luis)
- Municipality and village
- Interactive map of Las Vertientes (San Luis)
- Country: Argentina
- Province: San Luis Province
- Time zone: UTC−3 (ART)

Las Vertientes (San Luis) is a village and municipality in San Luis Province in central Argentina.

== Demographics ==
demographic vertical bar chart of between 1991 and 2010
