= Nahuel Mapá =

Coordinates: 34°47′S 66°10′W

- Municipality and village
- Interactive map of Nahuel Mapá
- Country: Argentina
- Province: San Luis Province
- Elevation: 1,506 ft (459 m)

Population (2001 INDEC)
  - Total: 71
- Time zone: UTC−3 (ART)
- Postcode: D6279
- Area code: 02658

Nahuel Mapá is a village and municipality in San Luis Province in central Argentina.
