= Las Aguadas =

Coordinates: 32°22′S 65°30′W

- Municipality and village
- Interactive map of Las Aguadas
- Country: Argentina
- Province: San Luis Province
- Time zone: UTC−3 (ART)

Las Aguadas is a village and municipality in San Luis Province in central Argentina.

== Demographics ==
demographic vertical bar chart of between 1991 and 2010
