= Lavaisse =

Coordinates: 33°49′S 65°25′W

- Municipality and village
- Interactive map of Lavaisse
- Country: Argentina
- Province: San Luis Province
- Time zone: UTC−3 (ART)

Lavaisse is a village and municipality in San Luis Province in central Argentina.
