= Chosmes =

Coordinates: 33°24′S 66°49′W

- Municipality and village
- Interactive map of Chosmes
- Country: Argentina
- Province: San Luis Province
- Time zone: UTC−3 (ART)

Chosmes is a village and municipality in San Luis Province in central Argentina.
