= Riocito =

Coordinates: 33°05′42″S 65°59′34″W

- Municipality and village
- Interactive map of Riocito
- Country: Argentina
- Province: San Luis Province
- Time zone: UTC−3 (ART)

Riocito is a village and municipality in San Luis Province in central Argentina.
