= San Pablo, San Luis =

Coordinates: 32°39′S 65°18′W

San Pablo (San Luis)
- Municipality and village
- Interactive map of San Pablo (San Luis)
- Country: Argentina
- Province: San Luis Province
- Time zone: UTC−3 (ART)

San Pablo (San Luis) is a village and municipality in San Luis Province in central Argentina.
