= Bagual, San Luis =

Coordinates: 35°09′S 65°35′W

Bagual (San Luis)
- Municipality and village
- Interactive map of Bagual (San Luis)
- Country: Argentina
- Province: San Luis Province
- Time zone: UTC−3 (ART)

Bagual (San Luis) is a village and municipality in San Luis Province in central Argentina.
