= La Fortuna =

La Fortuna may refer to:

Places:

- La Fortuna, San Carlos, Costa Rica, a district and small city
- La Fortuna, Bagaces Cantón, Costa Rica, a district and village
- La Fortuna Waterfall (Costa Rica)
- Río de la Fortuna, a river in Bolivia

Other uses:

- La Fortuna (Metro Madrid), a station on Line 11
- La Fortuna (TV series), a drama first broadcast in 2021 in Spain
- Allegory of Fortune, sometimes also named La Fortuna, an oil painting created around 1658 or 1659 by Salvator Rosa

== See also ==
- Fortuna (disambiguation)
