= Fortín El Patria =

Coordinates: 34°46′S 65°31′W

- Municipality and village
- Interactive map of Fortín El Patria
- Country: Argentina
- Province: San Luis Province
- Time zone: UTC−3 (ART)

Fortín El Patria is a village and municipality in San Luis Province in central Argentina.
