= Mosmota =

Coordinates: 33°38′S 66°59′W

- Municipality and village
- Interactive map of Mosmota
- Country: Argentina
- Province: San Luis Province
- Time zone: UTC−3 (ART)

Mosmota is a village and municipality in San Luis Province in central Argentina.
