= Nogolí =

Coordinates: 32°55′S 66°20′W

- Municipality and village
- Interactive map of Nogolí
- Country: Argentina
- Province: San Luis Province
- Time zone: UTC−3 (ART)

Nogolí is a village and municipality in San Luis Province in central Argentina.
