= Villa Elena, San Luis =

Coordinates: 32°30′29″S 64°59′57″W

Villa Elena
- Municipality and village
- Interactive map of Villa Elena
- Country: Argentina
- Province: San Luis Province
- Time zone: UTC−3 (ART)

Villa Elena is a village and municipality in San Luis Province in central Argentina.
