= Buena Esperanza =

Coordinates: 34°45′S 65°15′W

- Municipality and town
- Interactive map of Buena Esperanza
- Country: Argentina
- Province: San Luis Province
- Time zone: UTC−3 (ART)

Buena Esperanza is a small town and municipality in San Luis Province in central Argentina.
