= Martín de Loyola =

Coordinates: 35°37′S 66°17′W

- Municipality and village
- Interactive map of Martín de Loyola
- Country: Argentina
- Province: San Luis Province
- Time zone: UTC−3 (ART)

Martín de Loyola is a village and municipality in San Luis Province in central Argentina.
