= Villa de Praga =

Coordinates: 32°32′S 65°39′W

- Municipality and village
- Interactive map of Villa de Praga
- Country: Argentina
- Province: San Luis Province

Villa de Praga is a village and municipality in San Luis Province in central Argentina.

== Demographics ==
demographic vertical bar chart of between 1960 and 2010
