= Saladillo, San Luis =

Coordinates: 33°12′S 65°51′W

Saladillo
- Municipality and village
- Interactive map of Saladillo
- Country: Argentina
- Province: San Luis Province
- Time zone: UTC−3 (ART)

Saladillo is a village and municipality in San Luis Province in central Argentina.
