= Villa General Roca =

- Municipality and village
- Location within Argentina
- Coordinates: 32°39′S 66°28′W
- Country: Argentina
- Province: San Luis
- Department: Belgrano

Government
  - Mayor: Dominga Cristina Torres
- Elevation: 631 m (2,070 ft)

Population (2010)
  - Total: 162
- Time zone: UTC−3 (ART)
- Postal code: D5703

Villa General Roca is a village and municipality in San Luis Province in central Argentina.
