= Paso Grande =

Coordinates: 32°52′S 65°39′W

- Municipality and village
- Interactive map of Paso Grande
- Country: Argentina
- Province: San Luis Province
- Time zone: UTC−3 (ART)

Paso Grande is a village and municipality in San Luis Province in central Argentina.

== Demographics ==
demographic vertical bar chart of between 1947 and 2010
