= Villa del Carmen, San Luis =

Coordinates: 32°57′S 65°03′W

Villa del Carmen (San Luis)
- Municipality and village
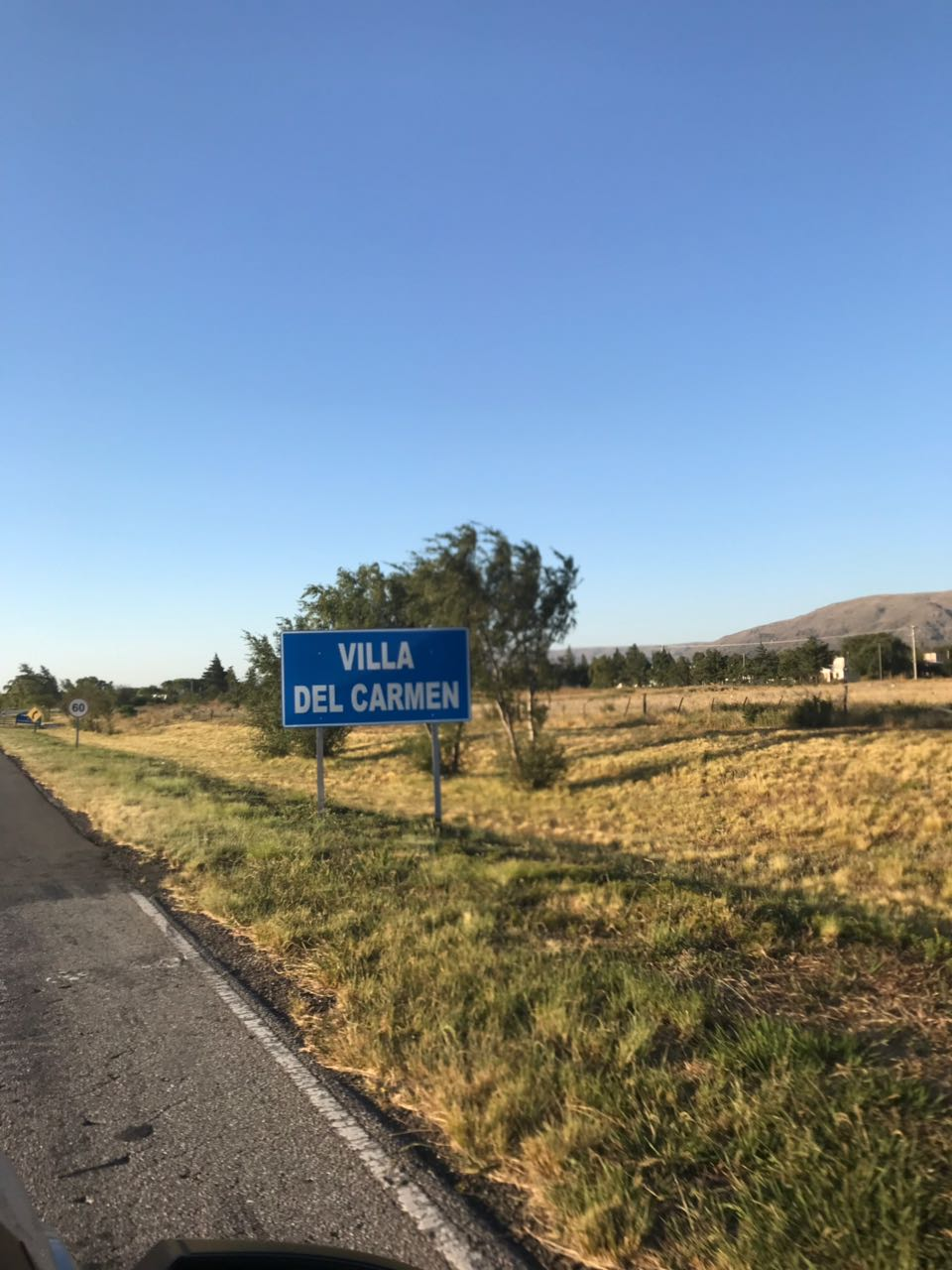
- Interactive map of Villa del Carmen (San Luis)
- Country: Argentina
- Province: San Luis Province
- Time zone: UTC−3 (ART)

Villa del Carmen (San Luis) is a village and municipality in San Luis Province in central Argentina.
