= Villa Elena =

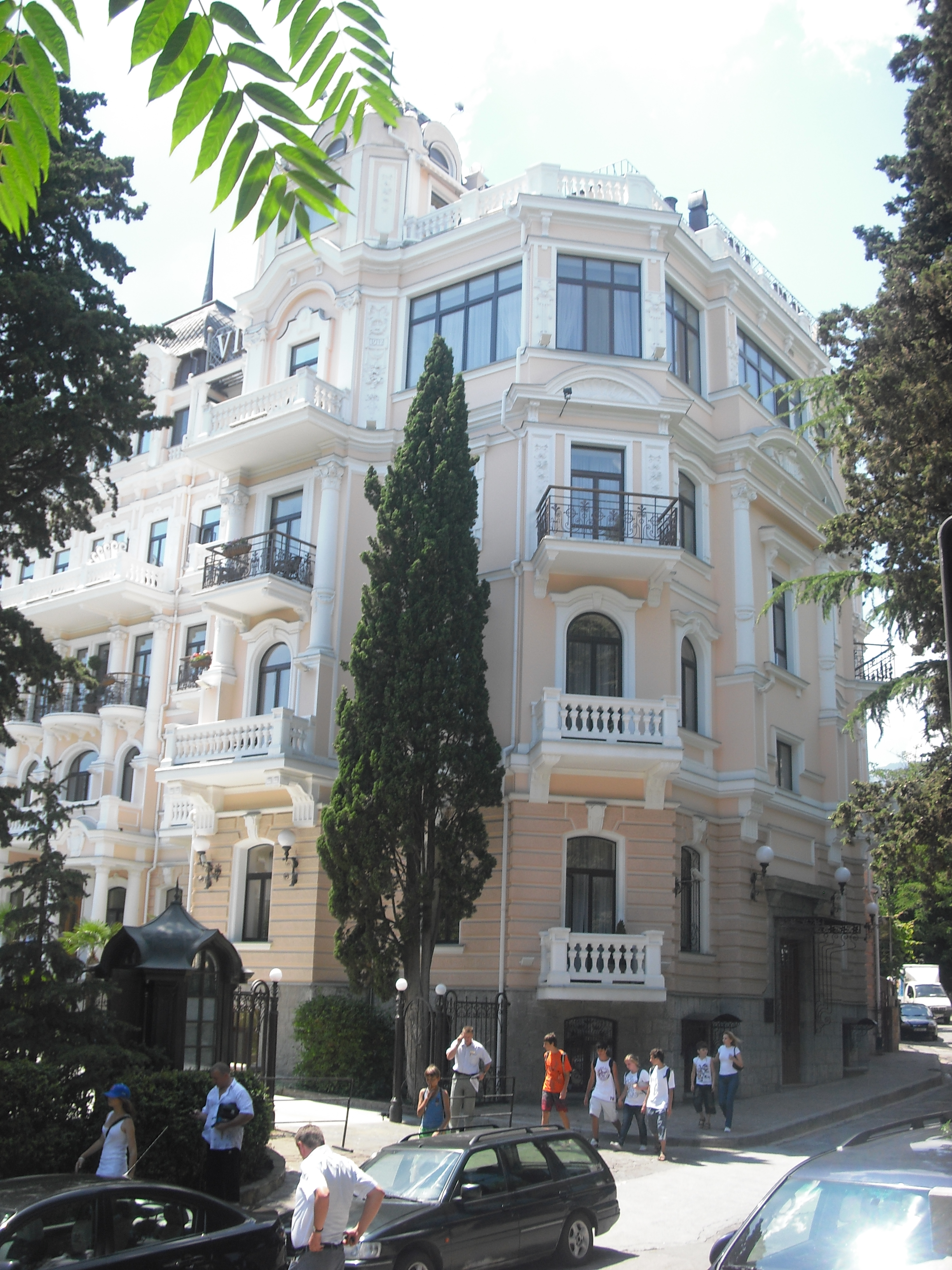

- Location within Crimea Location within Ukraine

General information
- Coordinates: 44.4946°N 34.1647°E

Website
- en.villaelenahotel.ru

Villa Elena is an historic building in Yalta in Crimea. Originally a private resident for a merchant, the building today is Crimea's first 5-star hotel.

== History ==
The property of the Villa Elena was originally part of the estate of Prince Golitsyn. In 1877, the spouse of the artist Grigory Myasoyedov – Elizaveta Mikhaylovna – purchased it and named it "Darsana".

In 1907 Ivan Vasilyevich Tikhomirov. a merchant from Saratov, purchased the house and rebuilt it into a villa. The Yalta architect Lev Nikolayevich Shapovalov was givin the project. The villa construction was finished by the autumn of 1912. The issue of Russian Riviera dated by 16 September 1912, posted an announcement about opening of a comfortably furnished hotel "Villa Elena" on Yalta sea-front promenade. It was named after Tikhomirov's daughter Elena.

More detailed information about the new hotel was published in the guidebooks of that time:

"A four- storeyed building constructed in 1912 in the style of modern after the project by architect L.N. Shapovalov. Following the best examples of foreign hotels, featuring all modern upgrades and facilities which other Yalta hotels could not boast to possess, such as: lift, central water pipe heating, running water in every room, huge terrace overlooking magnificent seascape and mountains panorama, sitting room, reading room and bathrooms. All rooms with balconies face southern direction and overlook a big decorative garden. Due to the favourable hotel location it is remote from the urban noise, dust and winds. It has a restaurant.

Villa Elena was a commercial success. Its income exceeded twice the one of Azov-Donsky Commercial Bank and the family of Tikhomirovs paid higher tax – 349 roubles 76 kopecks to compare with 147 roubles 80 kopecks paid by Azov-Donsky Commercial Bank. Even such hotels as "Dzhalita", "Oreanda" and "Saint-Petersburg" had a lower income.

In 1920, after the Russian Revolution, the Villa Elena was nationalized. During the Soviet period, the building was used as a convalescent house and later as a municipal resort policlinic. In 1969, Villa Elena was declared a historical monument of local significance because the building hosted the command of Yalta Red Guard militias in 1918.

In 2000 restoration work began on the Villa Elena; it was completed in 2007.After the Annexation of Crimea by the Russian Federation in 2014, all listed buildings in Crimea were relisted by Russia. Today Villa Elena Hotel & Residences is both a luxury hotel and a private residence.
