= Xirayas de San Luis–OPW =

Team information
- UCI code: XSL
- Registered: Argentina
- Founded: 2015
- Discipline: Road
- Status: UCI Women's Team

Key personnel
- General manager: Delfina Frers
- Team manager: Marcelo Alexandre

Team name history
- 2015 2016: Xirayas de San Luis; Xirayas de San Luis–OPW

Xirayas de San Luis–OPW (UCI code XSL) is a professional women's cycling team, based in Argentina, which is scheduled to compete in elite road bicycle racing events.

== Major wins ==
2015
Argentine rider classification Tour Femenino de San Luis, Maria Carla Alvarez

Stage 6, Alison Tetrick

2016
Argentina National Time Trial championships, Estefania Pilz

== National champions ==
2016
Argentine Time Trial, Estefania Pilz
Argentine Road Race, Maria Carla Álvarez

== Team roster ==
Rider	Date of birth
Talia Ayelen Aguirre (ARG)	17 February 1991 (age 35)
Maria Carla Alvarez (ARG)	17 September 1984 (age 41)
Mariela Analia Delgado (ARG)	26 July 1986 (age 40)
Antonella Lilia Leonardi (ARG)	19 October 1991 (age 34)

Rider	Date of birth
Paola Muñoz (CHI)	13 April 1986 (age 40)
Estefania Pilz (ARG)	7 August 1985 (age 41)
Valeria Romina Pintos (ARG)	17 November 1979 (age 46)
Alicia Claudia Reynoso Pueyo (ARG)	25 August 1975 (age 51)
Julia Sanchez Parma (ARG)	14 December 1990 (age 35)
