= Fortuna liga =

Fortuna liga may refer to the following sports competitions:

- Czech First League, the first-tier Czech football league, known as the Fortuna liga for sponsorship reasons.
- Czech National Football League, the second-tier Czech football league, known as the Fortuna National League for sponsorship reasons.
- I liga, the second-tier Polish football league, known as the Fortuna I liga for sponsorship reasons.
- Slovak First Football League, the first-tier Slovak football league, formerly known as the Fortuna liga.
