= Villa del Carmen, Formosa =

Coordinates: 26°15′04″S 58°15′22″W

Villa del Carmen (Formosa)
- Interactive map of Villa del Carmen (Formosa)
- Country: Argentina
- Province: Formosa Province
- Time zone: UTC−3 (ART)
- Climate: Cfa

Villa del Carmen (Formosa) is a settlement in northern Argentina. It is located in Formosa Province.
