= San Francisco del Monte de Oro =

Coordinates: 32°36′S 66°08′W

- Municipality and village
- Interactive map of San Francisco del Monte de Oro
- Country: Argentina
- Province: San Luis
- Time zone: UTC−3 (ART)

San Francisco del Monte de Oro is a village and municipality in San Luis Province in central Argentina.

San Francisco del Monte de Oro is the head municipality of the Ayacucho Department, in the province of San Luis, Argentina.

Location: 32°36'00'' S 66°07'60'' W

Altitude: 796 meters above sea level
