= Anchorena, San Luis =

Coordinates: 35°41′S 65°27′W

Anchorena (San Luis)
- Municipality and village
- Interactive map of Anchorena (San Luis)
- Country: Argentina
- Province: San Luis Province
- Time zone: UTC−3 (ART)

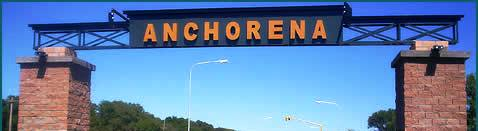
City entrance arc

Anchorena leads here. For the park and rest residence of the President of Uruguay, see Anchorena Presidential Estate

Anchorena (San Luis) is a village and municipality in San Luis Province in central Argentina.
