= Fortuna, San Luis =

Coordinates: 35°07′S 65°23′W

Fortuna (San Luis)
- Municipality and village
- Interactive map of Fortuna (San Luis)
- Country: Argentina
- Province: San Luis Province
- Time zone: UTC−3 (ART)

Fortuna (San Luis) is a village and municipality in San Luis Province in central Argentina.
