= San Luis Province =

Province of Argentina

Coordinates: 33°18′S 66°21′W

San Luis
- Province
- Province of San Luis; Provincia de San Luis (Spanish)
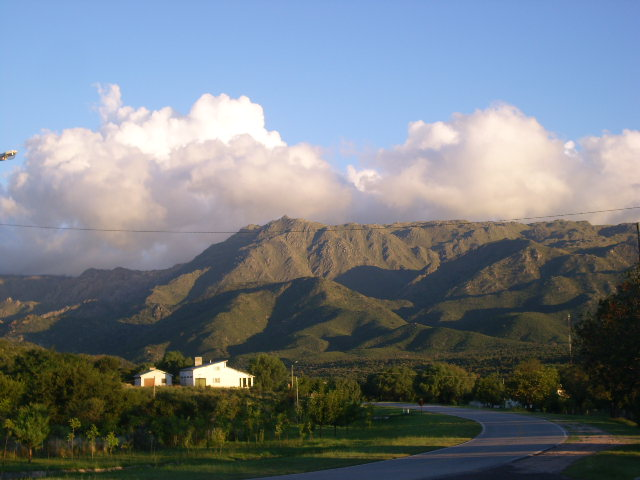
- View of the Cerro Negro

- Flag Coat of arms

- Country: Argentina
- Capital: San Luis
- Divisions: 9 departments

Government
  - Governor: Claudio Poggi (JxC)
  - Vice Governor: Ricardo Endeiza
  - Senators: Bartolomé Abdala, Ivana Arrascaeta, Fernando Salino

Area
  - Total: 76,748 km^{2} (29,633 sq mi)

Population (2022 census)
  - Total: 540,905
  - Rank: 19th
  - Density: 7.0478/km^{2} (18.254/sq mi)
- Demonym: Puntano

GDP
  - Total: US$ 7.0 billion
  - Per capita: US$ 13,500
- Time zone: UTC−3 (ART)
- ISO 3166 code: AR-D
- HDI (2021): 0.843 very high (10th)
- Website: sanluis.gov.ar

San Luis (Spanish pronunciation: [san ˈlwis]) is a province of Argentina located near the geographical center of the country (on the 32° South parallel). Neighboring provinces are, from the north clockwise, La Rioja, Córdoba, La Pampa, Mendoza and San Juan.

== History ==
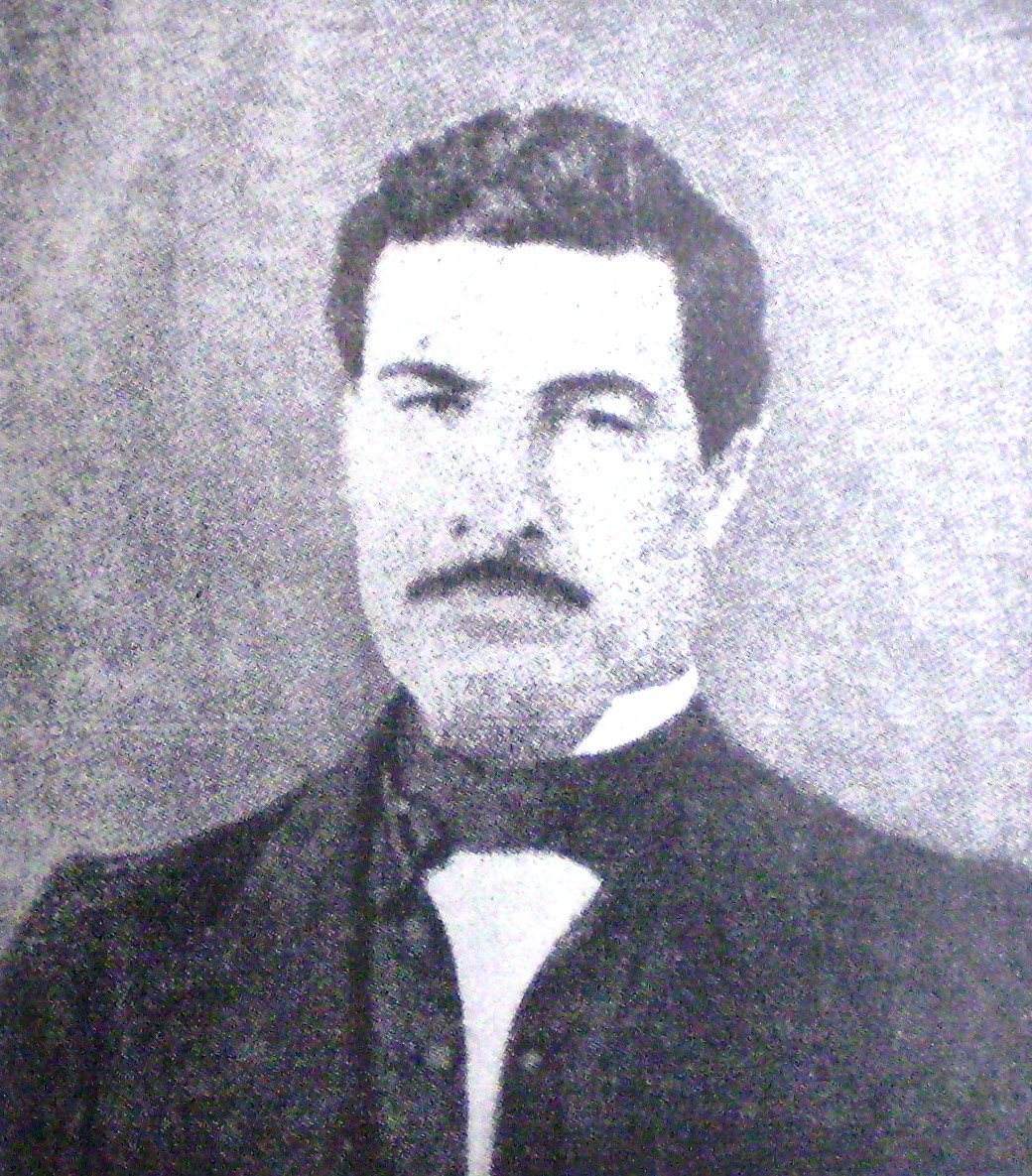
Juan Saá, early advocate for provincial autonomy.

The city of San Luis was founded in 1594 by Luis Jufré de Loaysa y Meneses, but was subsequently abandoned. It was refounded by Martín García Óñez de Loyola in 1596 under the name San Luis de Loyola.

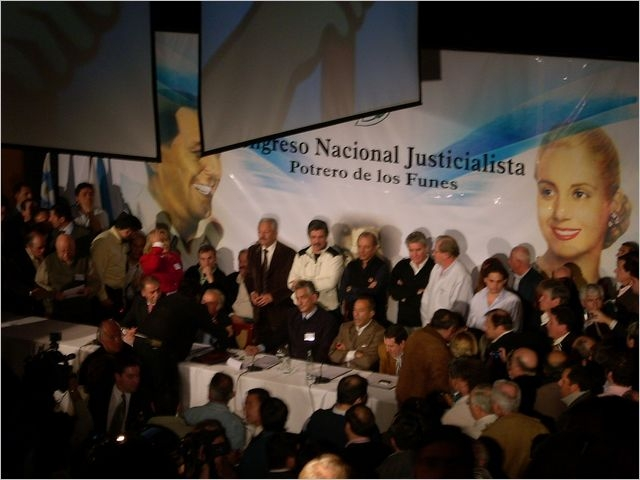
San Luis Justicialist Party officials confer under the images of Juan and Evita Perón. The Rodríguez Saá brothers are seated in the middle.

Since Argentina's return to democratic rule in 1983, in particular, the Rodríguez Saá family (of Peronist affiliation) has occupied the governor's seat. Former governor (now Senator) Adolfo Rodríguez Saá has overseen investment by light manufacturers (mostly food processors and bottling plants) and advances like the construction of Argentina's most extensive expressway network. Since 2023, Claudio Poggi has been the governor of San Luis Province, a position he previously held from 2011 to 2015.

== Economy ==
San Luis' economy has, over the past generation, been among the most improved in Argentina. Its 2006 output, estimated at US$3.386 billion, yielded a per capita income of US$9,203 (somewhat above the national average).

== Demographics ==
Historical evolution of the population of the province:

Historical population

Year	Pop.	±%
1778	6,956	—
1815	17,000	+144.4%
1820	20,000-25,000	—
1847	20,000	—
1853	30,000	+50.0%
1869	53,294	+77.6%
1895	81,450	+52.8%
1914	116,266	+42.7%

Year	Pop.	±%
1947	165,546	+42.4%
1960	174,316	+5.3%
1970	183,460	+5.2%
1980	214,416	+16.9%
1991	286,458	+33.6%
2001	366,900	+28.1%
2010	432,310	+17.8%
2022	540,905	+25.1%

== Government ==
The provincial government is divided into three branches: the executive, headed by a popularly elected governor, who appoints the cabinet; the legislative; and the judiciary, headed by the Supreme Court.

== Political division ==
The province is divided into nine departments (departamentos).

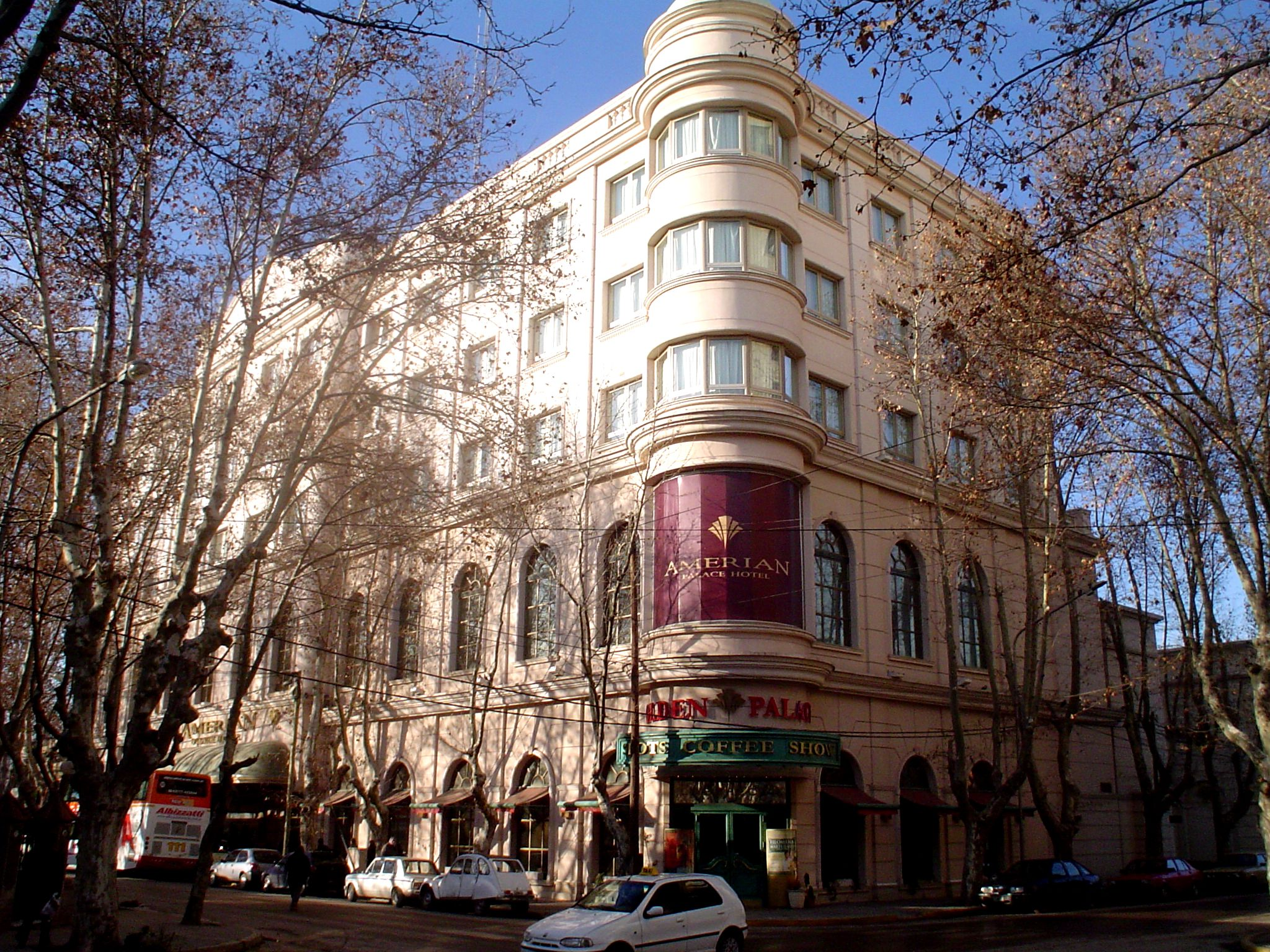
American Palace Hotel and Casino in Villa Mercedes.

Department	Capital
Ayacucho	San Francisco del Monte de Oro
Belgrano	Villa General Roca
La Capital	San Luis
Chacabuco	Concarán
Coronel Pringles	La Toma
General Pedernera	Villa Mercedes
Gobernador Dupuy	Buena Esperanza
Junín	Santa Rosa
Libertador General San Martín	Libertador General San Martín

Source for department names:

== Villages ==
- Desaguadero
- Villa de Merlo
