= List of television stations in Argentina =

In Argentina, for most of the history of broadcasting, there were only five major commercial national terrestrial networks until 2018. These were Canal Siete, El Nueve, El Trece, Telefe and América. Since 2018, Net TV became the sixth major commercial network, with Televisión Pública being the national public television service. Local media markets have their own television stations, which may either be affiliated with or owned and operated by a television network. Stations may sign affiliation agreements with one of the national networks for the local rights to carry their programming.

Transition to digital broadcasting began in 2009, when the Secretary of Communications recommended the adoption of the ISDB-T standard for digital television, with the "Argentine Digital Terrestrial Television System" being created. Digital television has reached 80 percent of Argentina as of December 2013. The country was expected to end all analogue broadcasts in 2019, but the date was later delayed to August 31, 2021.

As of 2019, household ownership of television sets in the country is 99%, with the majority of households usually having two sets.

== Major broadcast networks ==
Network	Launch date	Type	Owner	Operator
Canal Siete	October 17, 1951	Public	Government of Argentina	Radio y Televisión Argentina S.E.
El Nueve	June 9, 1960	Private	Grupo Octubre	Telearte S.A.
El Trece	October 1, 1960	Private	Clarín Group	Arte Radiotelevisivo Argentino S.A.
Telefe	July 21, 1961	Private	Grupo Televisión Litoral	Televisión Federal S.A.
América	June 25, 1966	Private	Grupo América & Claudio Belocopitt	América TV S.A.
Net TV	October 1, 2018	Private	Editorial Perfil	Kuarzo Entertainment Argentina
Alpha TV	September 14, 2026	Private	Alpha Media Group	Alpha Media S.A.

== National over-the-air commercial television networks ==
The following are the television networks with a presence throughout the national territory, via the "Televisión Digital Abierta" service (Open Digital Television in English).

Digital channel	Network	Launch date	Type	Owner	Operator	Description	Mobile channel (Note: The subchannel .31 is assigned to signals available for mobile devices.)
22.1	Encuentro	March 5, 2007	Public	Government of Argentina	Contenidos Públicos S.E.	Educational television	Encuentro
22.2	Pakapaka	September 17, 2010	Public	Government of Argentina	Contenidos Públicos S.E.	Children's programming	Encuentro
22.3	Aunar	October 17, 2022	Public	Government of Argentina	Contenidos Públicos S.E.	Public television	Encuentro
22.4	Cine.AR	December 28, 2010	Public	Government of Argentina	Contenidos Públicos S.E.	Argentinian movies	Encuentro
22.5	Tec TV	September 12, 2011	Public	Government of Argentina	Contenidos Públicos S.E.	Educational television	Encuentro
23.1	Canal Siete	October 17, 1951	Public	Government of Argentina	Radio y Televisión Argentina S.E.	Public television	Canal Siete
23.2	Construir TV	March 21, 2011	Private	Fundación UOCRA	Fundación UOCRA	Construction/Lifestyle	Canal Siete
24.1	DeporTV	February 21, 2013	Public	Government of Argentina	Contenidos Públicos S.E.	Sports	DeporTV
24.2	Canal 26	March 4, 1996	Private	Telecentro	Grupo Pierri	News programming	DeporTV
24.3	France 24	December 6, 2016	Public	Government of France	France Médias Monde	News programming	DeporTV
24.4	Crónica Televisión	January 3, 1994	Private	Grupo Olmos	Estrellas Satelital S.A.	News programming	DeporTV
24.5	Argentina/12	October 17, 2020	Private	Grupo Octubre	Telearte S.A.	News programming	DeporTV
24.6	El Destape TV	August 4, 2023	Private	Talar Producciones S.A.	Talar Producciones S.A.	News programming	DeporTV
25.1	Unife	November 25, 2019	Private	Universal Church	Universal Church	Religious	Unife
25.2	C5N	August 6, 2007	Private	Grupo Indalo	Grupo Indalo	News programming	Unife
25.3	La Nación +	November 7, 2016	Private	Grupo La Nación	La Nación	News programming	Unife
25.4	Telesur	July 24, 2005	Public	Governments of Venezuela, Cuba and Nicaragua	SiBCI	News programming	Unife
25.5	RT en Español	December 28, 2009	Public	Government of Russia	TV-Novosti	News programming	Unife
25.6	+Perfil	August 3, 2026	Private	Editorial Perfil	Perfil	News programming	Unife

== Over-the-air stations by area ==
=== Greater Buenos Aires ===
Operating since April 21, 2010 from the Ministry of Public Works Building in Buenos Aires, since October 1, 2010 from La Plata and Luján, since March 29, 2012 from Villa Martelli and since April 4, 2012 from San Justo.

Digital channel	Station	Launch date	Type	Owner	Operator	Description	Mobile channel
16.1 (Note: Broadcasting at medium power from Gregorio de Laferrere.)	Five TV Digital	March 1, 2017	Private	Santiago y Copla	Santiago y Copla	Community television	—N/a
16.2	SB Musical TV	March 22, 2024	Private	Santiago y Copla	Santiago y Copla	Community television	—N/a
16.1 (Note: Broadcasting at low power from Florencio Varela.)	Neo TV	September 16, 2020	Private	Neo TV S.A.	Neo TV S.A.	Local television	—N/a
16.2	La Poderosa TV	December 29, 2024	Private	Neo TV S.A.	Neo TV S.A.	Local television	—N/a
16.3	Quántica TV	December 1, 2023	Private	Quántica Medios	Quántica Medios	Community television	—N/a
16.4	Kairos TV	December 15, 2024	Private	Neo TV S.A.	Neo TV S.A.	Religious	—N/a
19.1 (Note: Broadcasting at low power from Buenos Aires.)	ATV Argentina	April 23, 2023	Private	Radio Metropolitana Argentina	Radio Metropolitana Argentina	Community television	—N/a
21.1	Caras TV	March 4, 2024	Private	Editorial Perfil	Perfil	Lifestyle	—N/a
21.2	Canal Orbe 21	October 4, 2006	Private	Roman Catholic Archdiocese of Buenos Aires	Archdiocesan Television Center	Religious	—N/a
26.1	Canal 26	March 4, 1996	Private	Telecentro	Grupo Pierri	News programming	—N/a
26.2	Construir TV	March 21, 2011	Private	Fundación UOCRA	Fundación UOCRA	Construction/Lifestyle	—N/a
26.3	Telemax	June 1, 2006	Private	Telecentro	Grupo Pierri	Commercial network	—N/a
27.1	Bravo TV	March 14, 2022	Private	Editorial Perfil	Kuarzo Entertainment Argentina	Commercial network	Net TV
27.2	Net TV	October 1, 2018	Private	Editorial Perfil	Kuarzo Entertainment Argentina	Major commercial network	Net TV
32.1 (Note: Broadcasting at high power from La Plata.)	UNLP TV	October 23, 2016	Public	National University of La Plata	National University of La Plata	Educational television	UNLP TV
32.1 (Note: Broadcasting at medium power from Buenos Aires.)	Barricada TV	June 1, 2017	Private	Asociación Civil Trabajo, Educación y Cultura	Asociación Civil Trabajo, Educación y Cultura	Community television	—N/a
32.2	Urbana Tevé	June 1, 2017	Private	Asociación Civil Centro de Rehabilitación y Capacitación San Martin de Residentes Salteños	Asociación Civil Centro de Rehabilitación y Capacitación San Martin de Residentes Salteños	Community television	—N/a
32.3	Comarca TV	November 1, 2013	Private	Asociación Martín Castellucci (ACMC)	ACMC	Community television	—N/a
32.1 (Note: Broadcasting at low power from Luján.)	Pares TV	January 7, 2018	Private	Coop. de Trabajo Pares Ltda.	Pares TV	Local television	—N/a
32.2	Pares TV (SD simulcast)	2009	Private	Coop. de Trabajo Pares Ltda.	Pares TV	Local television	—N/a
33.1	El Trece	October 1, 1960	Private	Clarín Group	Arte Radiotelevisivo Argentino S.A.	Major commercial network	El Trece
34.1	Telefe	July 21, 1961	Private	Grupo Televisión Litoral	Televisión Federal S.A.	Major commercial network	Telefe
35.1	El Nueve	June 9, 1960	Private	Grupo Octubre	Telearte S.A.	Major commercial network	El Nueve
35.2	KZO	May 22, 2017	Private	Editorial Perfil	Kuarzo Entertainment Argentina	Commercial network	El Nueve
35.3	Aspen	November 7, 1988	Private	Grupo Octubre	Grupo Octubre	FM commercial radio	El Nueve
36.1	América	June 25, 1966	Private	Grupo América	América Multimedios	Major commercial network	América
36.3	A24	March 8, 2005	Private	Grupo América	América Multimedios	News programming	América

=== Buenos Aires Province ===
==== Bahía Blanca ====
Operating with partial transmission from Bahía Blanca.

Digital channel	Station	Launch date	Type	Owner	Operator	Description	Mobile channel
28.1	Canal Siete	February 4, 1966	Private	Clarín Group & Francisco Quiñonero	Arte Radiotelevisivo Argentino S.A.	Major commercial network	—N/a

==== Mar del Plata ====
Operating since February 1, 2011 from Mar del Plata.

Digital channel	Station	Launch date	Type	Owner	Operator	Description	Mobile channel
20.1	Canal 8	December 18, 1960	Private	Neomedia Group	Neomedia de Gestión S.A.	Major commercial network	—N/a
27.1	Canal 10	November 22, 1965	Private	Grupo Olmos	TV Mar del Plata S.A.	Major commercial network	—N/a
28.1	Canal Universidad	March 13, 2017	Public	National University of Mar del Plata	National University of Mar del Plata	Public television	—N/a

==== Trenque Lauquen ====
Operating since August 16, 2012 from Trenque Lauquen.

Digital channel	Station	Launch date	Type	Owner	Operator	Description	Mobile channel
24.4	Canal 12	May 22, 1970	Public	Government of Argentina	Contenidos Públicos S.E.	Public television	—N/a

=== Catamarca ===
==== San Fernando del Valle de Catamarca ====
Operating since April 16, 2012 from San Fernando del Valle de Catamarca.

Digital channel	Station	Launch date	Type	Owner	Operator	Description	Mobile channel
27.1	Catamarca TV	April 24, 2014	Public	Government of Catamarca	Catamarca Radio y Televisión S.E.	Public television	—N/a
30.1	TVeo	April 1, 2000	Private	CVI Austral LLP	Super	Commercial network	—N/a

=== Chaco ===
==== Greater Resistencia ====
Operating since September 1, 2010 from Puerto Tirol.

Digital channel	Station	Launch date	Type	Owner	Operator	Description	Mobile channel
26.1	Somos Uno	June 3, 2013	Public	Government of Chaco	Government of Chaco	Public television	Somos Uno
27.2	Ciudad Televisión	October 2, 2017	Private	Radio Ciudad S.R.L.	Radio Ciudad S.R.L.	Local television	—N/a
28.1	Canal 9	August 17, 1966	Private	Grupo Linke	TV Resistencia S.A.I.F.	Major commercial network	Canal 9

==== Presidencia Roque Sáenz Peña ====
Operating since February 18, 2018 from Presidencia Roque Sáenz Peña.

Digital channel	Station	Launch date	Type	Owner	Operator	Description	Mobile channel
29.1	UNCAus TV	August 22, 2022	Public	National University of the Chaco Austral	National University of the Chaco Austral	Public television	—N/a
29.2	El Destape TV	August 4, 2023	Private	Talar Producciones S.A.	Talar Producciones S.A.	News programming	—N/a
29.3	Canal 2	January 1, 2007	Private	La Verdad S.R.L.	La Verdad S.R.L.	Major commercial network	—N/a
29.4	Crónica Televisión	September 17, 2010	Private	Grupo Olmos	Estrellas Satelital S.A.	News programming	—N/a

=== Chubut ===
==== Rawson ====
Operating since March 29, 2012 from Rawson.

Digital channel	Station	Launch date	Type	Owner	Operator	Description	Mobile channel
27.1	Canal 7	September 15, 1975	Public	Government of Chubut	Government of Chubut	Public television	—N/a

=== Córdoba ===
==== Greater Córdoba ====
Operating since January 1, 2011 from Cerro Mogote and since February 14, 2012 from Córdoba.

Digital channel	Station	Launch date	Type	Owner	Operator	Description	Mobile channel
21.2 (Note: Broadcasting at low power from Córdoba.)	Canal 7	May 1, 1990	Private	Megared Argentina	Megared Argentina	Local television	—N/a
27.1	El Doce	April 18, 1960	Private	Clarín Group & Francisco Quiñonero	Telecor S.A.C.I.	Major commercial network	El Doce
29.1	Telefe Córdoba	April 5, 1971	Private	Grupo Televisión Litoral	Televisión Federal S.A.	Major commercial network	Telefe Córdoba
29.2	Radio María Argentina	December 8, 1996	Private	Asociación Radio María	Asociación Radio María	Religious	Telefe Córdoba
30.1	Canal 10	May 11, 1962	Public	National University of Córdoba	Multimedio SRT	Public television	Canal 10
30.2	Canal U	June 1, 2011	Public	National University of Córdoba	Multimedio SRT	Educational television	Canal 10
41.2	Latina TV	August 12, 2016	Private	Latina TV Córdoba	Latina TV Córdoba	Local television	—N/a

==== Río Cuarto ====
Operating since February 14, 2012 from Río Cuarto.

Digital channel	Station	Launch date	Type	Owner	Operator	Description	Mobile channel
29.1	Canal 13	August 15, 1964	Private	Imperio Televisión S.A.	Imperio Televisión S.A.	Major commercial network	—N/a
31.1	UniRío TV	June 30, 2011	Public	National University of Río Cuarto	National University of Río Cuarto	Public television	—N/a

==== Villa María ====
Operating since May 1, 2011 from Villa María.

Digital channel	Station	Launch date	Type	Owner	Operator	Description	Mobile channel
31.1	Uni Teve	June 23, 2016	Public	National University of Villa María	National University of Villa María	Public television	—N/a

=== Corrientes ===
==== Greater Corrientes ====
Operating since March 29, 2012 from Corrientes. Also available in Greater Resistencia.

Digital channel	Station	Launch date	Type	Owner	Operator	Description	Mobile channel
31.1	13 Max	June 30, 1965	Private	Jorge Félix Gómez & Carlos Antonio Smith	Río Paraná TV S.R.L.	Major commercial network	—N/a
35.1	Corrientes TV	October 25, 2016	Private	Telemedia S.A.	Telemedia S.A.	Religious	—N/a

==== Monte Caseros ====
Operating since November 19, 2022 from Monte Caseros.

Digital channel	Station	Launch date	Type	Owner	Operator	Description	Mobile channel
34.1	AVC HD	May 13, 2010	Private	AVC Producciones	AVC Producciones	Local television	—N/a

=== Entre Ríos ===
==== Paraná ====
Operating since June 1, 2011 from Paraná.

Digital channel	Station	Launch date	Type	Owner	Operator	Description	Mobile channel
18.1	Canal 6 Entre Ríos TV	July 1, 2010	Private	Centro Radial Televisivo y Periodístico de Entre Ríos	Desde Entre Ríos	Commercial network	—N/a
36.1	El Once	May 2, 1992	Private	Federal Comunicaciones S.A.	Federal Comunicaciones S.A.	Commercial network	—N/a

=== Formosa ===
==== Clorinda–Laguna Blanca ====
Operating since February 8, 2013 from Clorinda and since January 29, 2014 from Laguna Blanca.

Digital channel	Station	Launch date	Type	Owner	Operator	Description	Mobile channel
33.1	Canal 11 Lapacho	April 8, 1978	Public	Government of Formosa	Red Formoseña de Medios	Public television	Canal 11 Lapacho

==== Formosa ====
Operating since December 1, 2010 from Formosa.

Digital channel	Station	Launch date	Type	Owner	Operator	Description	Mobile channel
29.1	Canal 11 Lapacho	April 8, 1978	Public	Government of Formosa	Red Formoseña de Medios	Public television	Canal 11 Lapacho

=== Jujuy ===
==== San Salvador de Jujuy ====
Operating since May 1, 2011 from San Salvador de Jujuy.

Digital channel	Station	Launch date	Type	Owner	Operator	Description	Mobile channel
36.1	Canal 7	April 30, 1966	Private	Radio Visión Jujuy S.A.	Radio Visión Jujuy S.A.	Commercial network	Canal 7

=== La Pampa ===
==== Santa Rosa ====
Operating since October 6, 2011 from Santa Rosa.

Digital channel	Station	Launch date	Type	Owner	Operator	Description	Mobile channel
30.1	Canal 3	November 30, 1972	Public	Government of La Pampa	Government of La Pampa	Public television	Canal 3

=== La Rioja ===
==== La Rioja ====
Operating since February 1, 2011 from La Rioja.

Digital channel	Station	Launch date	Type	Owner	Operator	Description	Mobile channel
29.1	Canal 9	December 24, 1965	Public	Government of La Rioja	Radio y Televisión Riojana S.E.	Public television	Canal 9

=== Mendoza ===
==== Greater Mendoza ====
Operating since December 19, 2011 from Mendoza.

Digital channel	Station	Launch date	Type	Owner	Operator	Description	Mobile channel
28.1	Canal 9 Televida (Telefe)	May 27, 1965	Private	Alonso Family & Los Andes	Cuyo Televisión S.A.	Major commercial network	Canal 9 Televida
29.1	Canal Acequia	Unknown	Public	Government of Mendoza	Government of Mendoza	Public television	Canal Acequia
30.1	Señal U	Unknown	Public	National University of Cuyo	National University of Cuyo	Educational television	—N/a
31.1	El Siete (América)	February 7, 1961	Private	Grupo América	América Multimedios	Major commercial network	—N/a
31.2	A24	March 8, 2005	Private	Grupo América	América Multimedios	News programming	—N/a

=== Misiones ===
==== Posadas ====
Operating since June 1, 2011 from Posadas.

Digital channel	Station	Launch date	Type	Owner	Operator	Description	Mobile channel
30.1	Canal Doce Misiones	November 18, 1972	Public	Government of Misiones	Multimedios S.A.P.E.M.	Public television	Canal Doce Misiones

=== Río Negro ===
==== San Carlos de Bariloche ====
Operating since March 1, 2011 from Bariloche.

Digital channel	Station	Launch date	Type	Owner	Operator	Description	Mobile channel
27.1	El Seis (El Trece)	May 1, 1978	Private	Grupo Televisión Litoral	Bariloche TV S.A.	Major commercial television	—N/a

=== Salta ===
==== Salta ====
Operating since November 25, 2011 from Salta.

Digital channel	Station	Launch date	Type	Owner	Operator	Description	Mobile channel
35.1	Multivisión Federal	Unknown	Private	Multivision S.R.L.	Multivision S.R.L.	Commercial network	—N/a
35.2	El 10 TV	2010	Private	Multivision S.R.L.	Multivision S.R.L.	Commercial network	—N/a

=== San Juan ===
==== San Juan ====
Operating since February 1, 2011 from San Juan and since December 12, 2012 from San José de Jáchal.

Digital channel	Station	Launch date	Type	Owner	Operator	Description	Mobile channel
29.1	Blu HD	Unknown	Private	Blu Medios	Blu Medios	Commercial network	—N/a
30.1	Canal 13 San Juan TV	Unknown	Private	Diario 13 San Juan	Diario 13 San Juan	Commercial network	—N/a
30.2	CuidarTV	July 14, 2020	Public	Government of San Juan	Government of San Juan	Lifestyle	—N/a
31.1	Canal Ocho (América)	May 2, 1964	Private	Grupo América	América Multimedios	Major commercial network	Canal Ocho
31.2	A24	March 8, 2005	Private	Grupo América	América Multimedios	News programming	Canal Ocho
31.3	América	June 25, 1966	Private	Grupo América	América Multimedios	Major commercial network	Canal Ocho
31.4	8 Sports	Unknown	Private	Grupo América	América Multimedios	Sports	Canal Ocho
32.2	Canal Cuatro	December 1, 2000	Private	Archdiocese of San Juan	Archdiocese of San Juan	Commercial network/Religious	—N/a
33.1	Xama TV	October 25, 2017	Public	National University of San Juan	National University of San Juan	Public television	—N/a
33.2	Xama TV (SD simulcast)	October 25, 2017	Public	National University of San Juan	National University of San Juan	Public television	—N/a
35.1	Zonda TV	October 12, 2016	Private	Grupo El Zonda	Grupo El Zonda	Commercial network	—N/a
36.1	Telesol (Telefe)	December 10, 1996	Private	Andina S.A.	Andina S.A.	Major commercial network	Telesol
36.2	AM 1020	Unknown	Private	Andina S.A.	Andina S.A.	FM commercial radio	Telesol

=== San Luis ===
==== San Luis ====
Operating since December 14, 2011 from San Luis.

Digital channel	Station	Launch date	Type	Owner	Operator	Description	Mobile channel
28.1	San Luis +	December 24, 1972	Public	Government of San Luis	Government of San Luis	Public television	—N/a

=== Santa Fe ===
==== Greater Santa Fe ====
Operating since October 6, 2011 from Santo Tomé.

Digital channel	Station	Launch date	Type	Owner	Operator	Description	Mobile channel
28.1	Litus TV	December 24, 1972	Public	National University of the Litoral	National University of the Litoral	Public television	—N/a

==== Greater Rosario ====
Operating since October 6, 2011 from Rosario.

Digital channel	Station	Launch date	Type	Owner	Operator	Description	Mobile channel
32.1	El Tres TV (El Trece)	June 20, 1965	Private	Televisión Litoral S.A.	Grupo Televisión Litoral	Major commercial network	El Tres TV
33.1	Telefe Rosario (Telefe)	November 30, 2012 (Note: As HD broadcasting; November 18, 1964 as standard.)	Private	Grupo Televisión Litoral	Televisión Federal S.A.	Major commercial network	Telefe Rosario
33.2	Telefe Rosario (SD simulcast)	November 18, 1964	Private	Grupo Televisión Litoral	Televisión Federal S.A.	Major commercial network	Telefe Rosario

== See also ==
- Television in Argentina
- Television in Latin America
