= Channel 12 (Trenque Lauquen, Argentina) =

LU 91 TV Canal 12

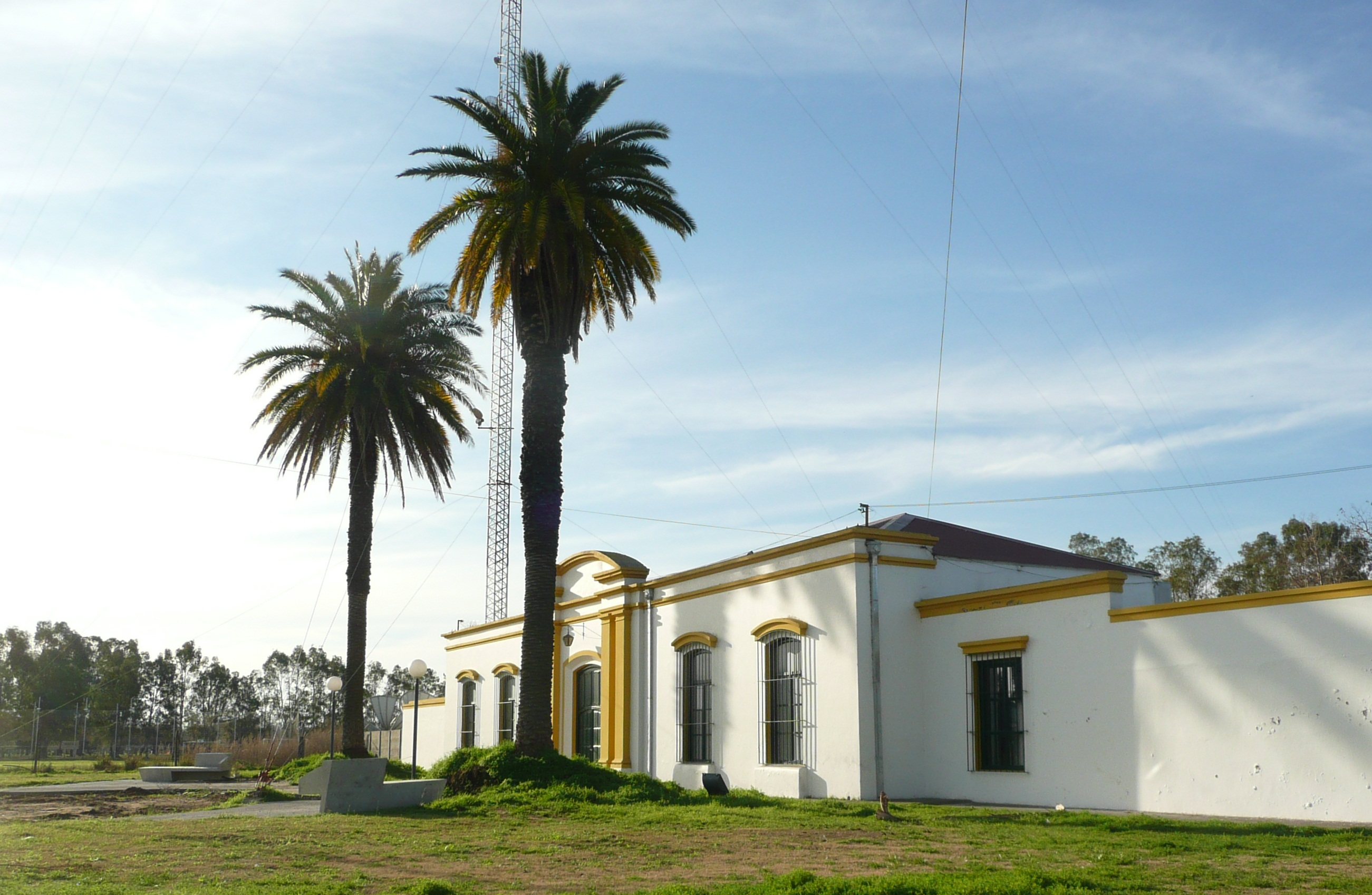
- Trenque Lauquen, Buenos Aires; Argentina
- Channels: Analog: 12 (VHF); Digital: 26 (UHF)
- Branding: Canal 12; Televisión Pública Regional

Programming
- Affiliations: Canal 7

Ownership
- Owner: Radio y Televisión Argentina S.A.U.; (Secretaría de Medios y Comunicación Pública)

History
- Founded: 1964 (closed circuit)
- First air date: May 22, 1970

Technical information
- Licensing authority: ENACOM

Links
- Website: https://noticiasdoce.com.ar

Canal 12 de Trenque Lauquen is an Argentine over-the-air television station which broadcasts from the city of Trenque Lauquen. The station is receivable in part of Buenos Aires Province. It is owned by Radio y Televisión Argentina and carries content from its flagship channel, Televisión Pública.

== History ==
The station's origins date back to 1963 when a closed-circuit television station (Canal 2) was set up. Its formal inauguration was held on October 12, 1964 when it started its closed-circuit free installation service and was operated by Radio y Televisión Trenque Lauquen (licensee of radio station LU 11 AM 1280 since 1963).

On April 17, 1970, by means of Decree nº. 1737, the National Executive Power granted Secretaría de Difusión y Turismo a license to operate on channel 9 in the city of Trenque Lauquen, Buenos Aires Province.

The license started its regular broadcasts on May 22, 1970 as LU 91 TV Canal 9, founded by Radio y Televisión Trenque Lauquen.

In 1975, the Argentine State (at the time under the presidency of Isabel Perón) took intervention on Canal 9. However, on May 14, by means of Decree nº. 1291, the National Executive Power returned to the control of its license and was given to an intervener.

In 1976, during Juan Perón's dictatorship, the station was definitivelyput in the hands of the National State.

In 1980, it moved from channel 9 to channel 12.

On June 19, 1981, by means of Resolution nº. 61, COMFER started a public contest for the bidding of the station. After that, on March 15, 1985, by means of Resolution nº. 172, it authorized the municipality of Quemú Quemú to install a relay station of Canal 12, on VHF channel 4; however, on July 7, 1989, COMFER through Resolution 223) revoked the authorization of the municipality on the grounds that Argentina Televisora Color (currently Televisión Pública) installed a relay station there.

In 2003, Canal 12 became a part of public company Sistema Nacional de Medios Públicos. On December 10, 2009, Canal 12 and the media outlets of the Public Media System became a part of Radio y Televisión Argentina Sociedad del Estado (which was created by the Media Law).

On April 26, 2012, Autoridad Federal de Servicios de Comunicación Audiovisual, by means of Resolution nº. 512, authorized Canal 12 to hold test digital terrestrial television broadcasts in the ISDB-T format (adopted in Argentina in 2009). The station was granted physical UHF channel 26 for this purpose.

On November 7, 2014, Canal 12 started local digital broadcasts on TDA channel 24.4 (replacing Viajar). On November 19 that year, its new facilities were inaugurated.

On April 18, 2022, Canal 12 started its high definition broadcasts.

== Programming ==
The channel relays programming from Televisión Pública and Contenidos Públicos channels Encuentro and Pakapaka.

Among its local programs, there's Noticias 12 (its news service) and Pampero TV (rural newscast produced alongside INTA, winner of the Faro de Oro, Lanín de Oro Martín Fierro awards as the best rural program). Overnight, the station relays Cine.AR.

== Newscast ==
Noticias 12 is the station's news service, with emphasis on local news. Currently it has two editions on weekdays (at 12pm and 9pm), the noon edition is presented by Daniela Villaro and the evening edition by Lucas de Vito. There also used to be a morning magazine at 8am, "Las Noticias de las 8".

== Relayer ==
Canal 12 has a relay station installed in General Villegas.
