= Suri TV =

- Country: Argentina

Programming
- Language: Spanish
- Picture format: 576i SDTV

Ownership
- Owner: Albavisión (Señales Internacionales S.A. via Telearte S.A.)

History
- Launched: 3 January 2011; 15 years ago
- Closed: 20 November 2013; 12 years ago

Suri TV was an Argentine over-the-air television station owned by Albavisión, airing programming produced by six of its channels in four countries. It was available on the nascent digital terrestrial television platform throughout its existence.

== History ==
Suri TV started broadcasting on January 3, 2011 on channel 24.3. Albavisión was given two channels on MUX 24, the other being Video Éxito. The name came from the Quechua name for the ñandú (Rhea), which was used as the channel's symbol.

The channel ceased transmission on 20 November 2013. It was speculated that its bandwidth would be used by the HD feed of state-run sports channel DeporTV. The station's employee, Daniela Tumburus, was fired approximately one month later, causing a strike on its sister channel, Canal 9.

== Programming ==
Suri TV's programming was sourced from six stations of the Albavisión conglomerate: Peru's ATV and Global TV, Chile's La Red, Bolivia's Bolivisión and Paraguay's SNT and Paravisión. The line-up consisted of news and magazine programs from the channels. It also aired the Chilean version of Intrusos (an América format) at launch, relaying La Red.

These stations pooled their resources for live simulcasts of key events from the aforementioned countries. The first large-scale special event covered by the channel was the coverage of the official acts of Paraguay's bicentennial on 14 and 15 May 2011. For this end, it relayed the live coverage from its sister channel SNT. The channel also carried the live broadcast of Fernando Lugo's conference for the Paraguayan diaspora on 2 October 2011.
