= Channel 11 (Formosa, Argentina) =

LT 88 TV Canal 11
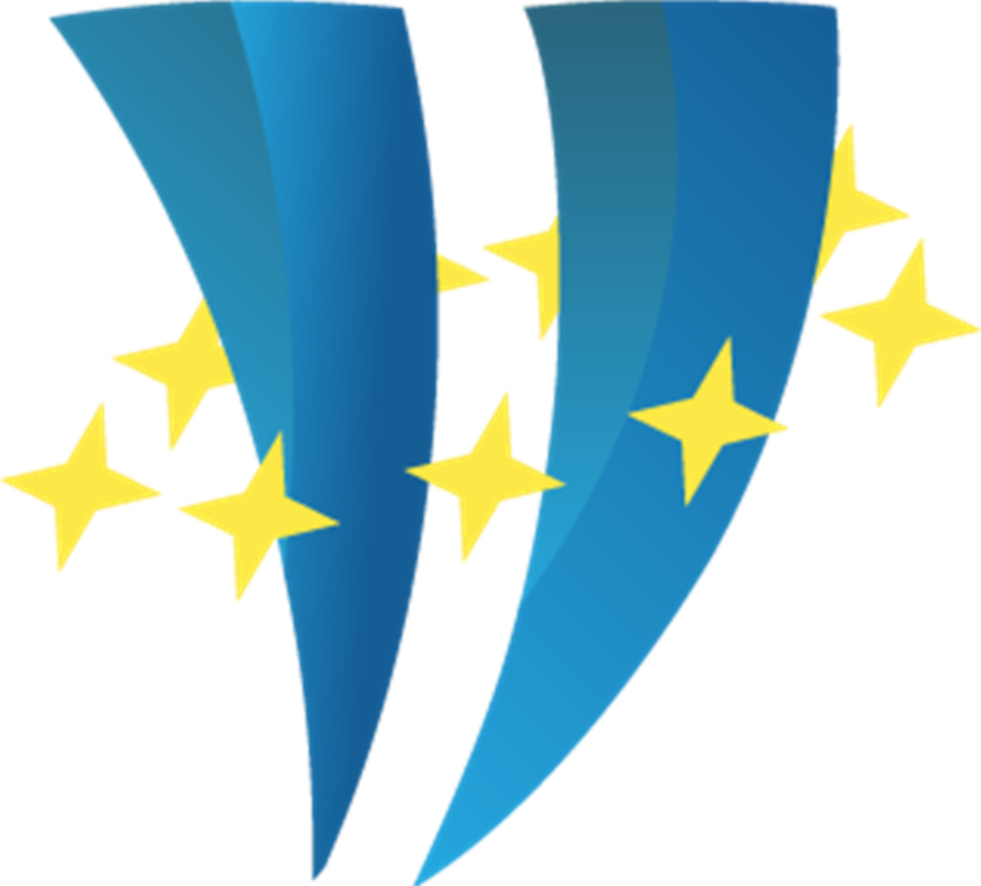

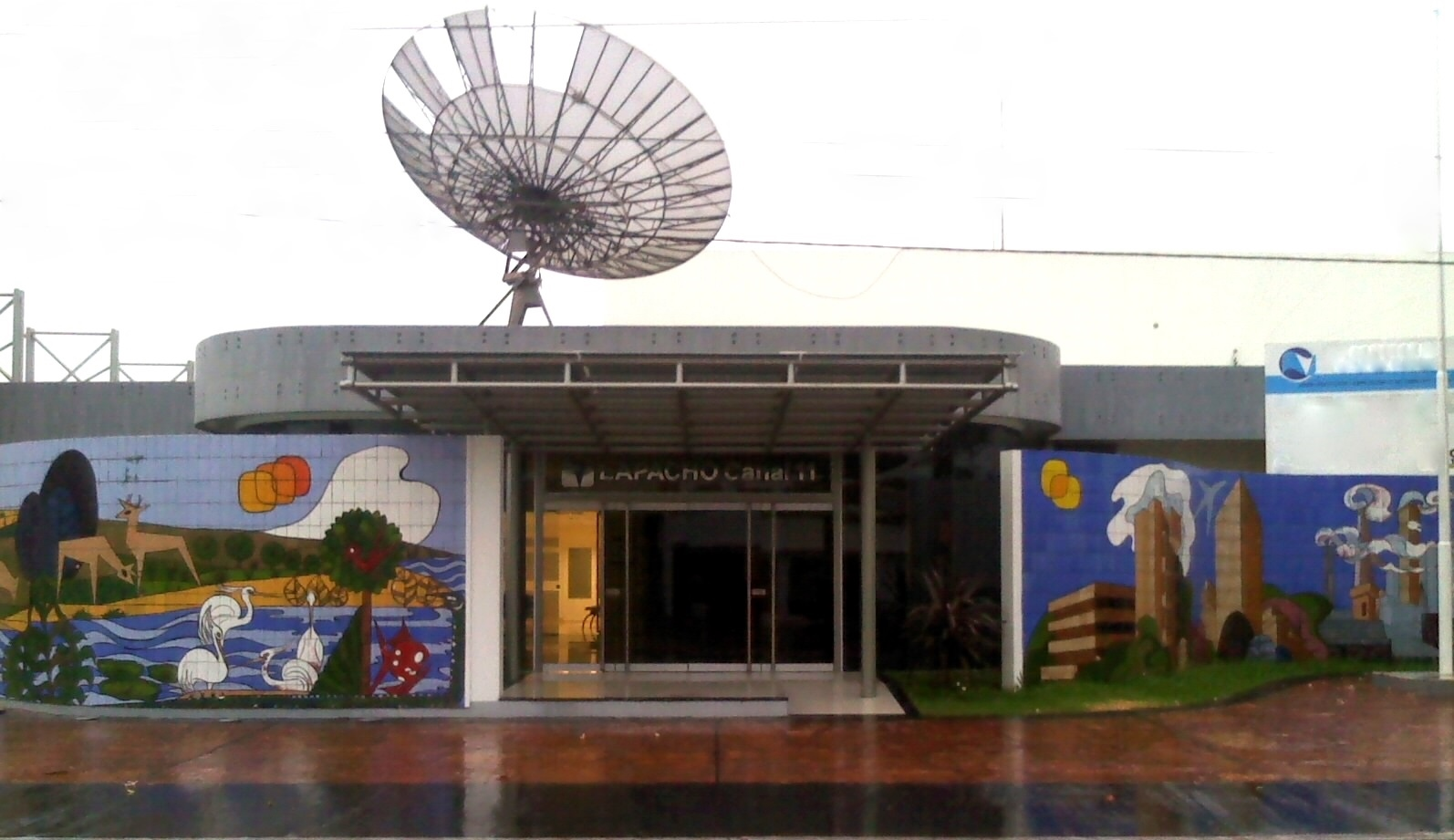
- Main access of the station from Junín street
- Formosa; Argentina
- Channels: Analog: 11 (VHF); Digital: 29 (UHF)
- Branding: Lapacho Canal 11

Programming
- Affiliations: C5N

Ownership
- Owner: Government of Formosa Province

History
- First air date: 8 April 1978
- Former names: Canal 11 Formosa (1978-1999)

Technical information
- Licensing authority: ENACOM
- Repeater: Channel 7 (Clorinda)

Links
- Website: lapachocanal11.com.ar

Canal 11 Formosa (call sign LT 88 TV), branded as Lapacho, is a television station broadcasting on channel 11 in Formosa, Formosa Province, Argentina and is owned by the provincial government.

== History ==
On May 22, 1970, by means of Decree 2333, the National Executive Chamber issued the provincial government a license to operate on VHF channel 3 in the city of Formosa, capital of the province of the same name.

That same year, when military governor Augusto Sosa Laprida ordered and obtained on behalf of dictator Juan Carlos Onganía the authorization to install a provincial television station in Formosa, budget problems delayed the realization of the project.

On June 26, 1976, in Monte Carlo, Carlos Monzón won in the fifth round to Rodrigo Valdez and won his boxing title. To watch the fight live, locals had to go to Hostería Rodani, on the other side of Bermejo River, because Chaco Province had an over-the-air television station since 1960.

That same year, the media needs of the military process made the de facto governor Juan Carlos Colombo to begin its construction, with provincial resources, set to be founded in time for the 1978 FIFA World Cup.

Originally, it planned to use channel 3 as its frequency; however, the license moved to channel 11. The license finally started its regular broadcasts on April 8, 1978 as LT 88 TV Canal 11 de Formosa.

That way, it was founded to cover the 1978 FIFA World Cup; but its first regular broadcasts were held in 1979, with the aim of celebrating the centennial of the Formosan capital.

The first images were in black and white, while color television started in 1980, when, in an unexpected manner, under the management of Colombo and Videla, they put the station under the national radar. Thus, an unacceptable dispossession was consummated that could only be amended 20 years later.

On December 3, 1979, by means of Decree 3081, the National Executive Chamber approved the protocols signed between Formosa Province and the federal government.

On February 15, 1982, by means of Resolution 60, Comité Federal de Radiodifusión called for a public tender to award the Channel 11 license. On November 16, 1989, by means of Resolution 2336, it authorized the provincial government to install relay stationos in Ibarreta, Laguna Naineck and Las Lomitas, assigning each relay station channels 6 and 3, respectively.

On January 8, 1997, by means of Decree 14, the National Executive Chamber restored the provision and operation of the television service of Channel 11 to the province's inland region.

On December 9, 1999, Governor Gildo Insfrán appointed the first auditor of Channel 11 and, on December 13, through Provincial Decree 13, “Lapacho LT 88 Canal 11 Formosa” was created as a “deconcentrated entity with direct dependence on the Executive Branch”.

Since the 2000s, it is carrying out an important service in an integrated way, articulating its activities to bring to the large audience in Formosa and the region, information, events, news, entertainment and everything that is of community interest, especially from satellite communication that puts the citizens of Formosa in immediate contact with the world. Both its authorities and all its staff work together, constituting the basis of Red Formoseña de Medios de Comunicación.

AFSCA, Through resolutions 570 of December 29, 2010 and 689 of June 24, 2011, it authorized Channel 11 to carry out tests on the new digital terrestrial television platform, using the ISDB-T standard (adopted in Argentina by means of Decree 1148 of 2009). For this end, the station was granted physical UHF channel 29.

That same year, Canal 11 started broadcasting on channel 29.1 of TDA in Formosa; in September 2015, the signal arrived to Clorinda and Laguna Blanca on channel 33.1.

== Programming ==
Currently, part of its programming consists of relays from C5N, a news channel based in Buenos Aires.

The station also airs local programming, among them Noticiero 11 (its news service), Hola mañana (morning magazine), Tarde pero seguro (afternoon magazine), Desde el Litoral (musical program) and Desde tierra adentro (general interest).

On June 1, 2016, Canal 11 ended relaying Telefe's programming, replacing its content with C5N from September that year.

== Noticiero 11 ==
Noticiero 11 is the station's news service with emphasis on Formosa Province. Currently, it has two editions seen on weekdays (at 12:30 and 20:00).

Originally, the newscast (which started months after its founding) was named Noticiero 11. In 1999, after the change of Canal 11's corporate image, it was renamed Lapacho Noticias. Since 2005, the old name Noticiero 11 was restored.

== Relayer ==
Canal 11 has a relay station in Clorinda, which broadcasts on channel 7. In Subteniente Perín, a community station that acts as a relay of Canal 11 exists.
