= Brilhante F.C. =

- Also known as: Brilhante Futebol Clube
- Genre: Drama; Coming-of-age
- Created by: Marcelo Müller
- Written by: Rodrigo Castilho; Claudio Yosida
- Directed by: Kiko Ribeiro; Luís Pinheiro; Zaracla
- Creative director: Luca Paiva Mello
- Starring: Priscila Lima; Lívia Stacciarini; Fernanda Dias Neves; Suellen Arrabal da Silva; Julia Foti; Lilian de Lima; Lucas Papp
- Narrated by: Priscila Lima
- Composer: Fil Pinheiro
- Country of origin: Brazil
- Original language: Brazilian Portuguese
- No. of seasons: 1
- No. of episodes: 13

Production
- Producer: João Daniel Tikhomiroff
- Editor: Ricardo Gonçalves
- Production company: Mixer

Original release
- Network: TV Brasil; Nickelodeon Brazil; TV Cultura
- Release: May 23 – August 22, 2011

Brilhante F.C. is a Brazilian teen drama television series co-produced and broadcast by TV Brasil and Nickelodeon Brazil. It premiered on May 23, 2011 and concluded on August 22, 2011 on TV Brasil, whereas on Nickelodeon it premiered on September 2, 2013 and concluded on September 18, 2013. The series was written by Rodrigo Castilho and Claudio Yosida, with direction being jointly handled by Kiko Ribeiro, Luís Pinheiro and Zaracla. It was produced by Brazilian production company Mixer.

The project was filmed over a period of four months on location at Santa Rita do Sapucaí, Minas Gerais. To serve as a film set, the production company had to elaborate infrastructure within the city, which collaborated with the local economy; jobs were generated through the recruitment of 102 technicians and market professionals, 24 actors and 547 extras.

Brilhante F.C. premiered on TV Cultura on December 1, 2013 and concluded its broadcasting cycle on February 23, 2014. The show premiered on Pakapaka on March 4, 2013.

== Plot overview ==
Brilhante F.C. revolves around the lives of five young girls who gather up to form the first female soccer team in Santa Rita do Sapucaí, rural zone of Minas Gerais. Together, they cope with the prejudice and the difficulties of dealing with a team without monetary resources and state aid in the middle of an inner city. Meanwhile, each one deal with their own personal problems, such as religion choice, puberty, love relationships, and schoolwork.

== Cast and characters ==
Portrayer	Character
Priscila Lima	Rita
Lívia Stacciarini	Giovana
Fernanda Dias Neves	Formiga/Franciele
Suellen Arrabal da Silva	Raquel
Julia Foti	Jessy
Lilian de Lima	Mazé
Robério Brandão	Wagner
Lucas Papp	Maicol
João Signorelli	Aloísio
Flávio Almeida	Silas
Marcelo Rodrigues	Ricardo
Ricardo Dantas	José
Lucas Ebenezer	Vitor Lima

== Episodes ==
No.	Title	Original air date (TV Brasil)	Original air date (Nickelodeon)	Original air date (TV Cultura)
1	"Hora de Jogar Bola"	May 23, 2011	September 2, 2013	December 1, 2013
2	"Extensão"	May 20, 2011	September 3, 2013	December 8, 2013
3	"Marcação Homem-a-Homem"	June 6, 2011	September 4, 2013	December 15, 2013
4	"Pênalti"	June 13, 2011	September 5, 2013	December 22, 2013
5	"Impedimento"	June 20, 2011	September 6, 2013	December 29, 2013
6	"Contra-Ataque"	June 27, 2011	September 9, 2013	January 5, 2014
7	"Reversão"	July 4, 2011	September 10, 2013	January 12, 2014
8	"Jogo Estratégico"	July 11, 2011	September 11, 2013	January 16, 2014
9	"Jogadora do Ano"	July 18, 2011	September 12, 2013	January 25, 2014
10	"Cama de Gato"	July 26, 2011	September 13, 2013	February 2, 2014
11	"Luta do Capitão"	August 1, 2011	September 16, 2013	February 9, 2014
12	"Siga Seu Coração"	August 8, 2011	September 17, 2013	February 16, 2014
13	"A Eliminatória"	August 22, 2011	September 18, 2013	February 23, 2014
