= Canal Siete (Argentina) =

Public television network of Argentina

Coordinates: 34°34′50″S 58°23′49″W

- Logo used since 2026

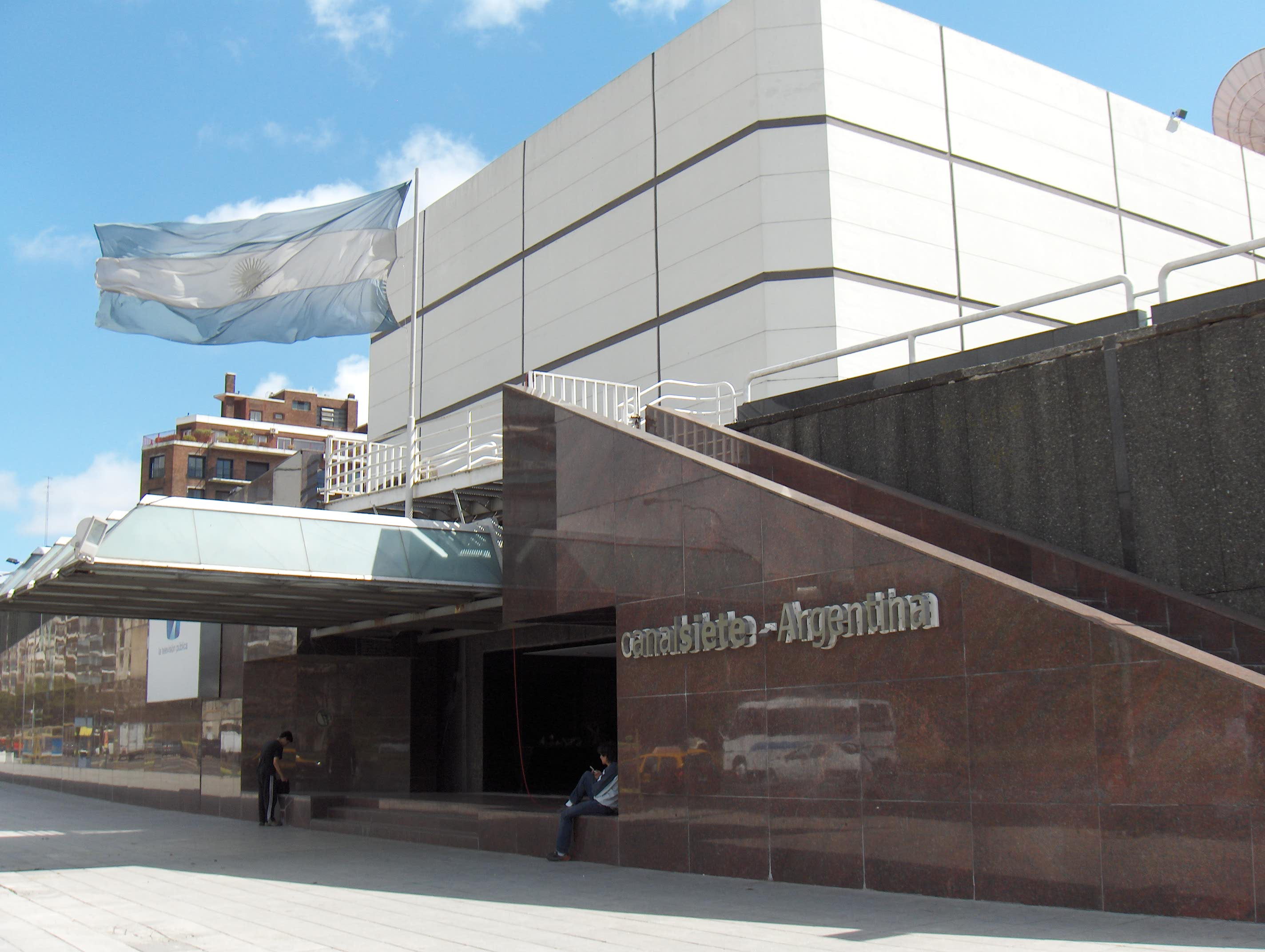
- Canal Siete headquarters in Buenos Aires
- Country: Argentina
- Broadcast area: Argentina; Worldwide
- Headquarters: Buenos Aires

Programming
- Language: Spanish
- Picture format: 1080i HDTV (downscaled to 576i for the SD feed)

Ownership
- Owner: Jefatura de Gabinete de Ministros; Gobierno de Argentina
- Parent: Radio y Televisión Argentina S.A.U.
- Key people: Len Cole; Eduardo González
- Sister channels: Encuentro; Pakapaka; DeporTV; CINE.AR; TEC; Aunar

History
- Founded: 1951; 75 years ago
- Launched: 17 October 1951
- Former names: List: LR3 Radio Belgrano Televisión (1951-1959); Canal 7 (1959-1973, 1976-June 1978, July 1978-1979, 2000-2009); Canal 7 Televisión Argentina (1973-1976); Argentina Televisora Color (1979-1996, 1996-1999, 2000); ATeCe (1996); TV Pública (2009-2016); Televisión Pública Argentina (2016-2020); Televisión Pública (2020-2026)

Links
- Website: canal7.com.ar

Availability

Terrestrial
- Analog VHF (Greater Buenos Aires): Channel 7
- Analog VHF (inside the country): Listings may vary
- Digital UHF: Channel 23.1 (HD); Channel 23.31 (SD)

Canal Siete (Channel 7, callsign LS 82 TV Canal 7) is a publicly owned Argentine television network, the national public broadcaster. It began broadcasting in 1951, when LR3 Radio Belgrano Televisión channel 7 in Buenos Aires, its key station and the first television station in the country, signed on the air.

== History ==
=== 1951–1978: Foundations ===
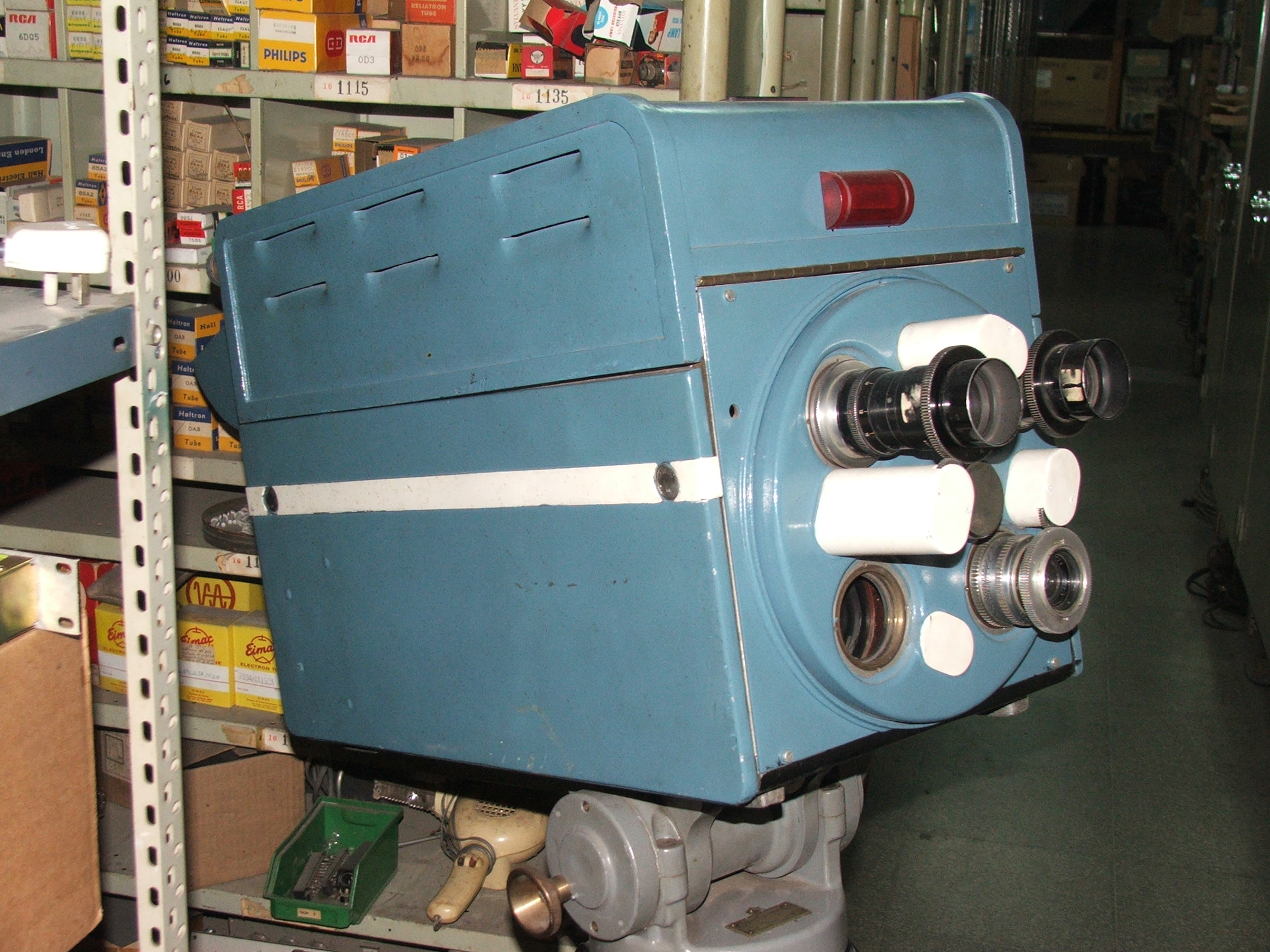
One of the first TV cameras used by Canal 7

Jaime Yankelevich, businessman and operator of radio station LR3 "Radio Belgrano", received the approval of the Perón family to import television equipment from the United States. The final approval came from Eva Perón, who, when informed of the importation of the new equipment, said "Sí, sí, todo muy lindo pero yo lo que quiero es que televisen el acto del Día de la Lealtad" ("Yes, yes, all very good, but what I want is for them to televise the acts of Loyalty Day"). With the support of Minister of Communications Oscar Lorenzo Nicolini and the Radio Belgrano executives, preparations were made to start the first television station in Argentina. Yankelevich imported Bell equipment, DuMont cameras, and a horizontally polarized antenna initially mounted on the MOP Building. On September 24, 1951, Radio Belgrano announcer Fito Salinas was put behind a camera and backed by a musical group, and the first test transmissions commenced. On the first days of tests, televisions were set up in department stores in a 500-meter radius around the site, and the transmitter put out 500 watts of power, but the signal was ramped up and brought to 40 kW power. At that power level, reception was clear for 72 km (45 mi) around.

Finally, October 17, 1951, came, and once more, channel 7 signed on for the first time under the name it would bear for a decade: LR3 Radio Belgrano TV. The first broadcast was conducted on Loyalty Day, as Eva Perón wanted, from the Plaza de Mayo; the remote cameras were connected to the studios by a cable link. 2,500 televisions were in place in the country to watch the events. For the first time in 24 days, Eva Perón rose from her bed to attend, dressed in black. The CGT awarded her the Distinction of Recognition and to president Juan Perón the Great Peronist Medal of Extraordinary Class. Doses of tranquilizers, administered by the education minister, were necessary to allow Eva to deliver a brief address, her final political testament, in which she mentioned her own death nine times.

On November 4, 1951, LR3-TV began regular commercial telecasts, broadcasting from 5:30 to 10:30pm each day. In 1957, the studios moved to the Alas Building, where they occupied two subfloors, the first floor and the basement; the station remained there until 1978. In 1961, the television and radio station parted the separate ways, with the television station adopting its current callsign, LS 82 TV.

There was even a brief period in which the station was awarded to a private entity: Editorial Haynes was awarded the license in 1954 by Perón's government, but the next year, the government of the Revolución Libertadora annulled the transfer, thus it remained a national channel owned by the government.

=== 1978–2000: Color television ===
Argentina hosted the 1978 FIFA World Cup. In order to allow for the event to be broadcast in color around the world, new color studio facilities were required; the country still had no color telecasts of its own. At the same time, there was unfinished construction in Buenos Aires; in the mid-1970s, prior to the coup of 1976, work had commenced on the Altar de la Patria (Altar of the Fatherland), which was to be a mausoleum for Eva and Juan Perón. A new innovative television center was built on the underground site for what was named Argentina 78 Televisora (A78TV), the television production center for the World Cup. The facility, situated on Avenida Figueroa Alcorta, was Argentina's first dedicated television studio facility with features such as soundproofed studios. The center was outfitted with new Bosch Fernseh color equipment, which would be in service for decades. Among the various tasks that A78TV performed was the delivery of color live video to movie theaters over coaxial cable and export of color live video for worldwide coverage. However, just one match was broadcast in color to Argentina itself—the final match, between Argentina and the Netherlands—using the PAL-N color standard.

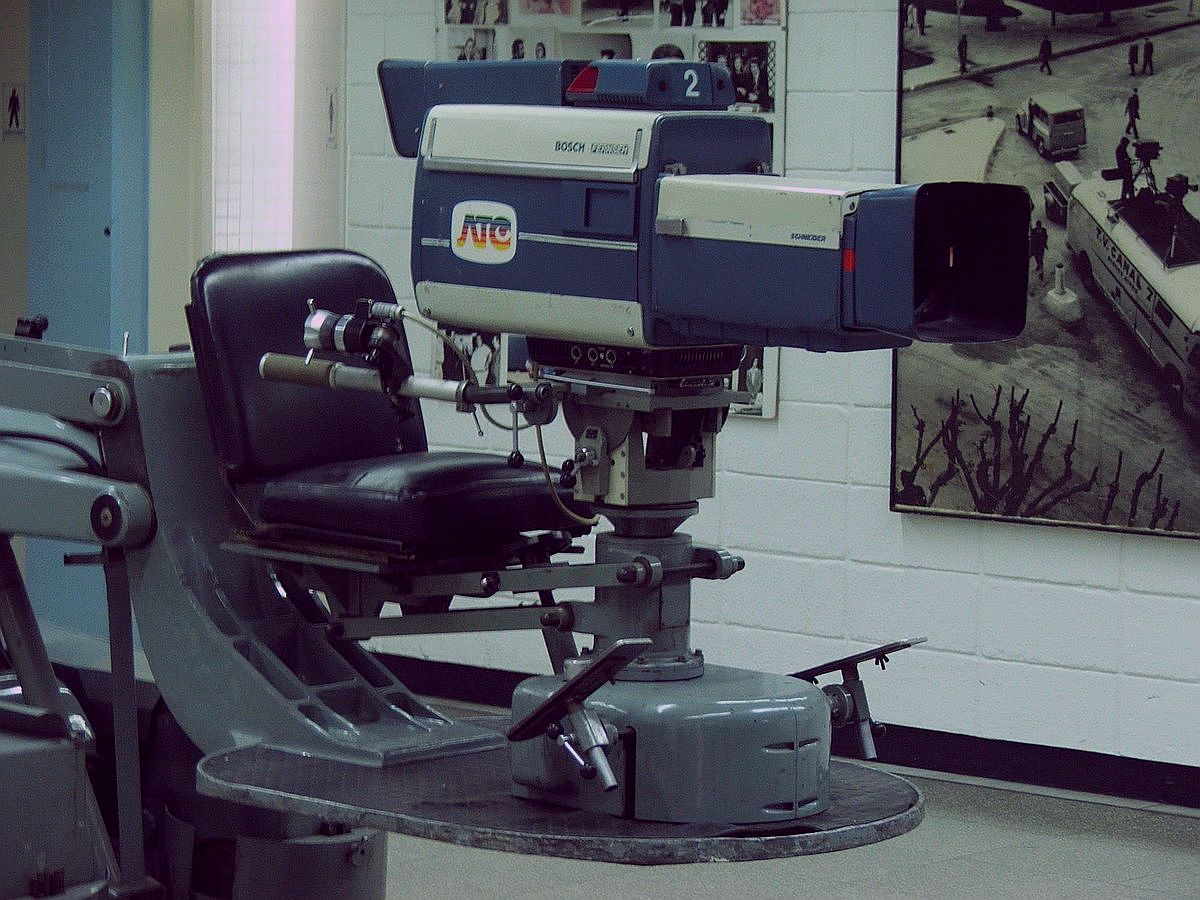
One of the Bosch Fernseh cameras from 1978; an ATC logo sticker has been placed over the A78TV striped logo

In 1979, Canal 7 took control of the new complex, and with it came a new name. On May 3, Canal 7 became Argentina Televisora Color (ATC), a name that would serve the channel for the remainder of the 20th century. Carlos Montero helped design the new channel's identity. It was Pinky who, on May 1, 1980, officially introduced color TV to Canal 7, thus launching the ATC brand in full.

The investment in ATC paid off, and briefly in the early 1980s, before the rise of Alejandro Romay's Canal 9 Libertad, ATC led the national television ratings, a feat it has not accomplished since. As state network it brought news of the Falklands War of 1982 to Argentine TV viewers nationwide, with correspondents and news crews going into the actions of the conflict, and led a national publicity campaign in support of the war effort. Dubbed "Argentines, To Victory" (Argentinos, a Vencer), ATC and the national government produced several commercials for this campaign, and on the opening day of the war broadcast a special program dedicated to the conflict broadcast in all its stations nationwide, and, for the first time ever for an Argentine TV station, also in South American countries (save Uruguay) and the United States, via satellite broadcasts.

The 1990s were a more turbulent time for ATC. On one front, the Bosch Fernseh equipment, which was still the bulk of the channel's workflow, was aging, and replacement parts and fixes were getting harder to find. On another, under Carlos Menem, ATC was almost privatized and, in 1996, even had an unusual five-month change of identity to ATeCE, a la Argentina (ATeCE, to Argentina), with a new, more nationalist approach. The new logo was unveiled in February of that year, costing AR$60,000, and was designed by Orestes Lucero, coinciding with the introduction of a new schedule (due March and April) and the rename of its news operation to Pueblo Noticias (People News). According to ATeCE director Roberto Eliseo Llanini, the identity represented the Argentine flag, while the slogan has two interpretations: ATeCE as in "átése" (the correct spelling was "átése") as in "attach yourself to Argentina" and becoming part of Argentina as a whole. It was also believed that the pun also alluded to UCéDé.

=== 2000–2023: Canal 7, TV Pública and Televisión Pública Argentina ===
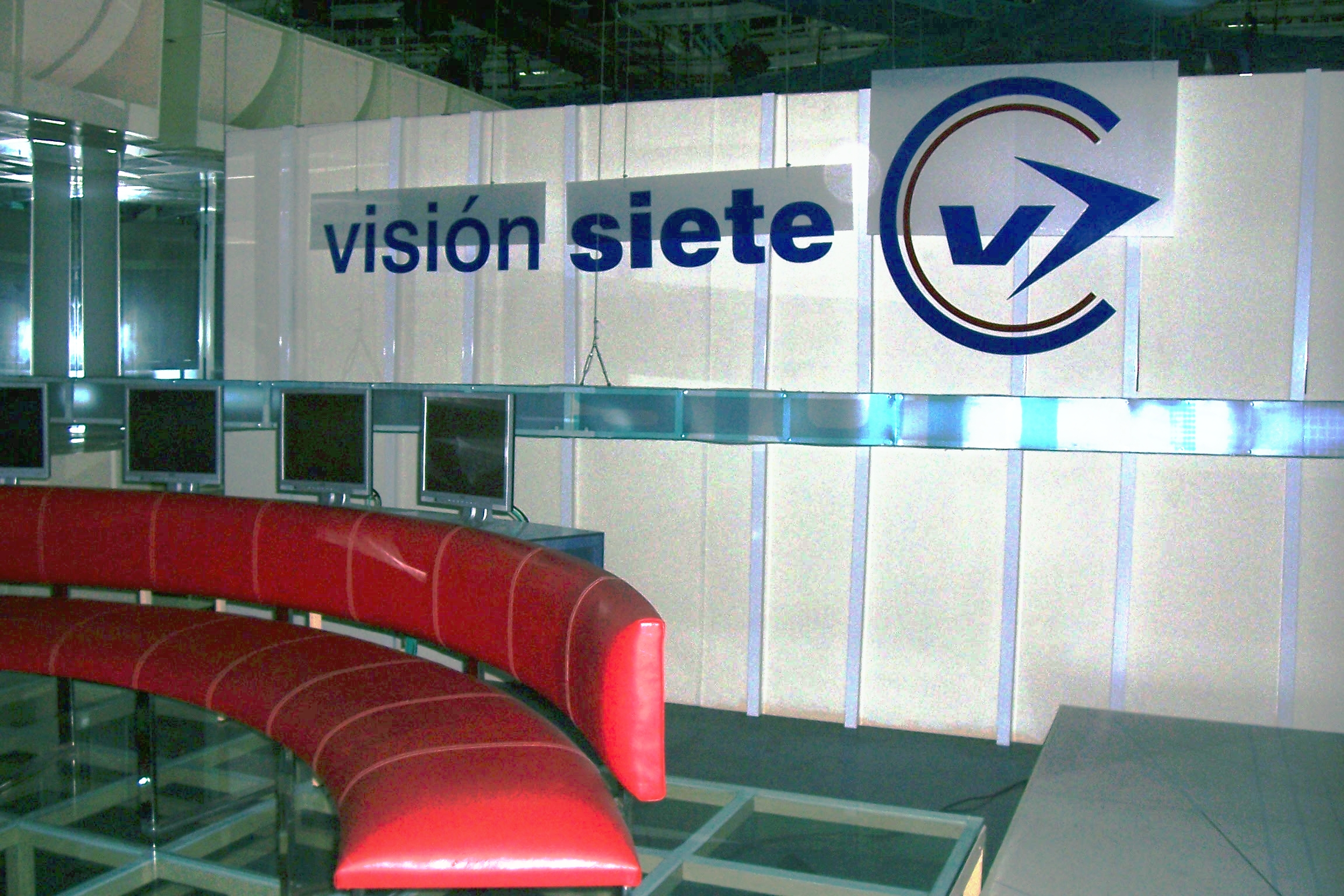
The set of Visión Siete, TV Pública Digital's main newscast, circa 2007

Under the presidency of Fernando de la Rúa by the turn of the 21st century, long-term changes came to ATC for the first time in years. On 1 January 2000, ATC rebranded under an emergency administration that would take control of the channel until April, using a plain wordmark with the full name of the channel as its temporary logo. This administration would help ATC leave out of its financial ruin. On 1 May, after a four-month transitional period, the ATC brand was finally retired, and the channel returned to being just Canal 7. Among the new programs introduced were Desayuno with Victor Hugo Morales, Doble Click with Quique Pessoa, a new season of Todo por dos pesos with Fabio Alberti and Peter Capusotto and Pulgas en el 7 with members of the Cablín team.

In 2001 Canal 7 celebrated the golden jubilee year anniversary of its first broadcasts. In addition, the National System of Public Media (SNMP) was formed as a managing and financing entity for the channel. SNMP was replaced by a new entity, Radio y Televisión Argentina Sociedad del Estado, with the Audiovisual Media Law in 2009.

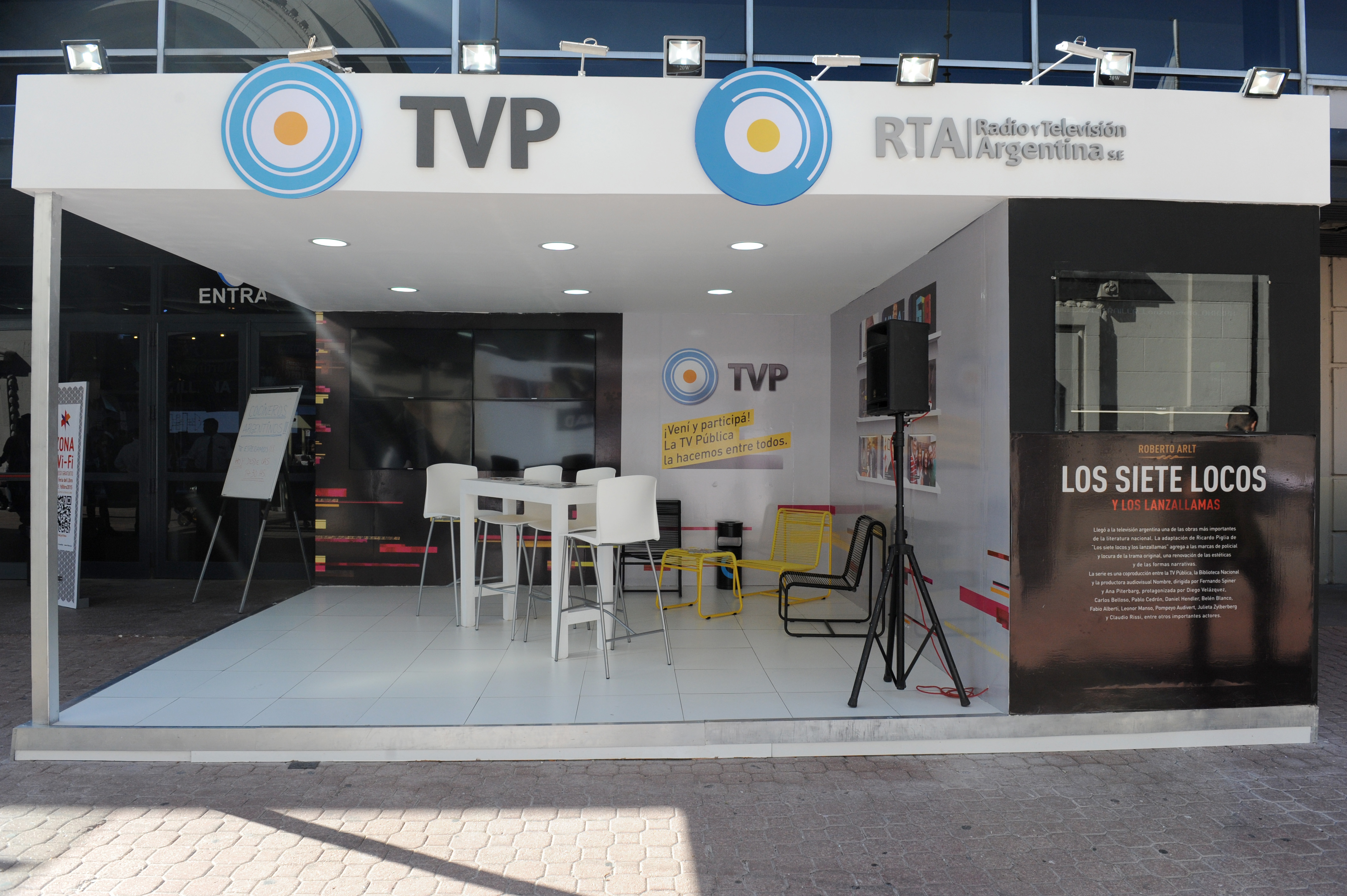
TV Pública booth at La Rural exhibition in 2015

At the beginning of the presidency of Néstor Kirchner, the channel's management was split into fiction and non-fiction; this led to an increase in its in-house productions. In 2006, Rosario Lufrano became the new director of Canal 7, changing its name to TV Pública and refocusing the channel to a more cultural emphasis. At the same time, new equipment—much of it ready for high definition telecasts—was ordered, finally putting to pasture the 1978-vintage Bosch Fernseh cameras and switchers.

In April 2010, TV Pública launched its digital signal on UHF channel 23, in the ISDB-T standard also used by Japan and Brazil. The signal includes HD, SD and 1segfeeds. With the launch of the digital signal, the first in the country, the name of the channel was changed again, to the current TV Pública Digital

On 18 April 2016, as part of its 65th anniversary, TV Pública changed its name to Televisión Pública Argentina (Argentine Public Television)..

=== Since December 2023 ===
In December 2023 Javier Milei became president of Argentina. Milei's views include privatization or closure of Televisión Pública. On election day, while Milei was voting, several of his supporters attacked a Canal 7 crew covering the election and threatened to seize reporter Gabriela Radice's microphone.

Milei has included public radio and television and the national news agency Telam on the list of state enterprises he intends to privatize or close, saying that the public media had become "a propaganda mechanism." He has announced that he will abolish all state advertising in the media. Reporters Without Borders condemned his actions as "encouraging media concentration and limiting pluralism and diversity, which has above all affected the most vulnerable media."

In September 2026, it was announced that the channel's name will be reverted to Canal 7, coinciding with its 75th anniversary. This took place on a special program on 17 October.

== Logo evolution ==
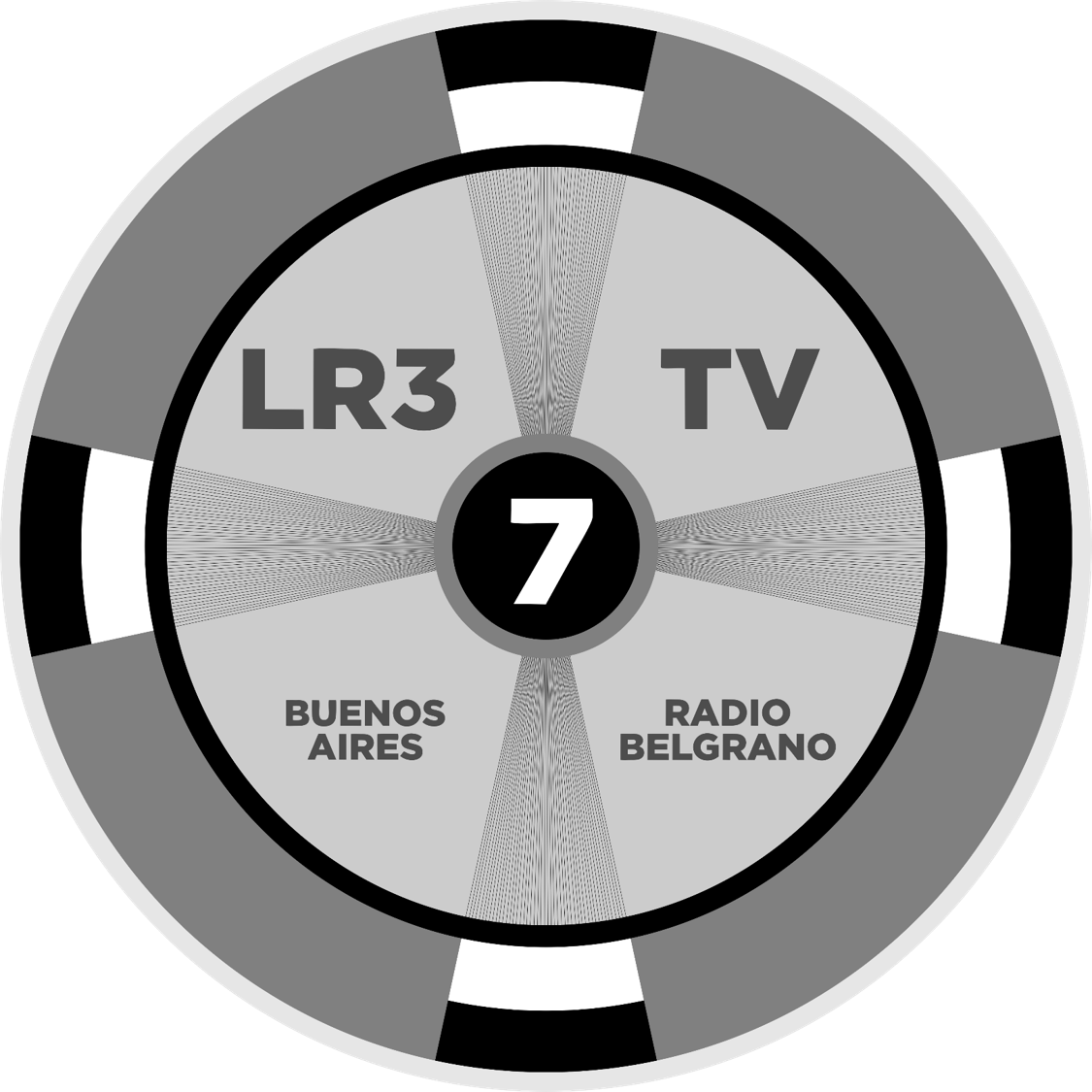
1951–59

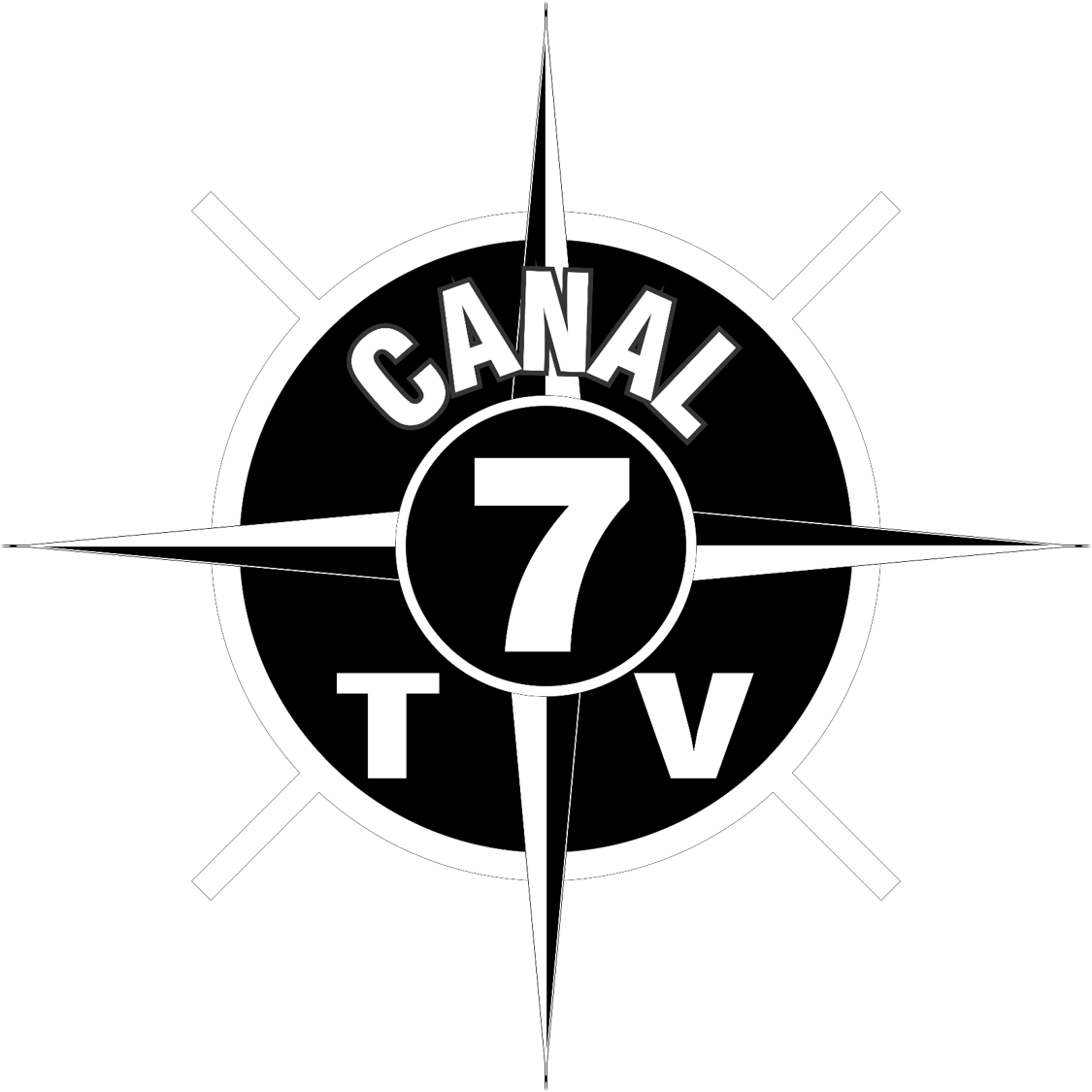
1959–61

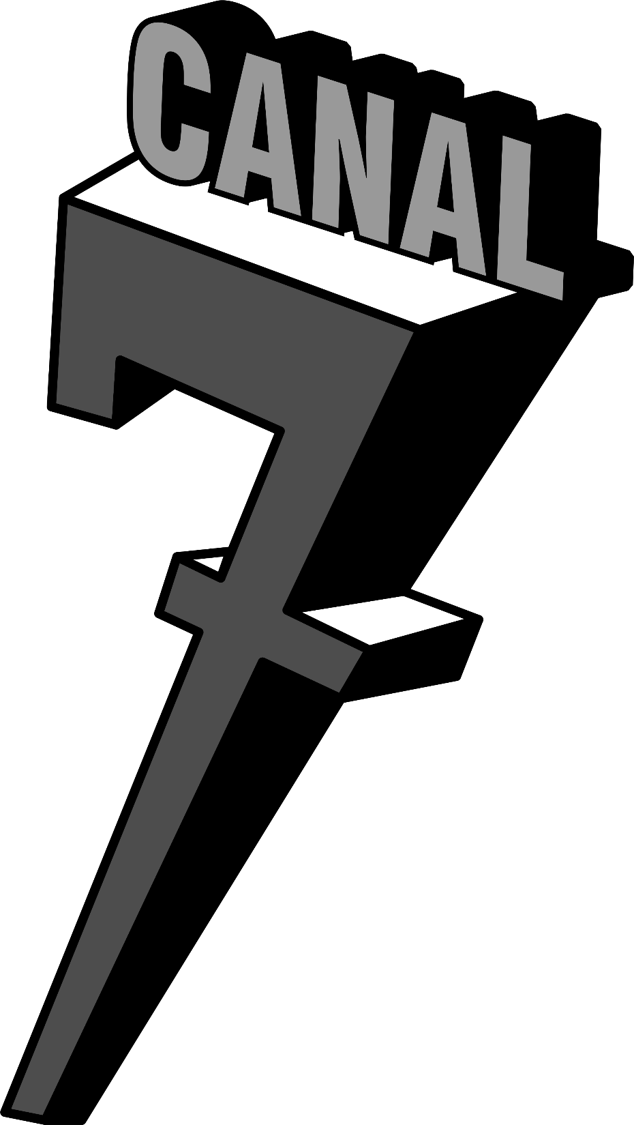
1961

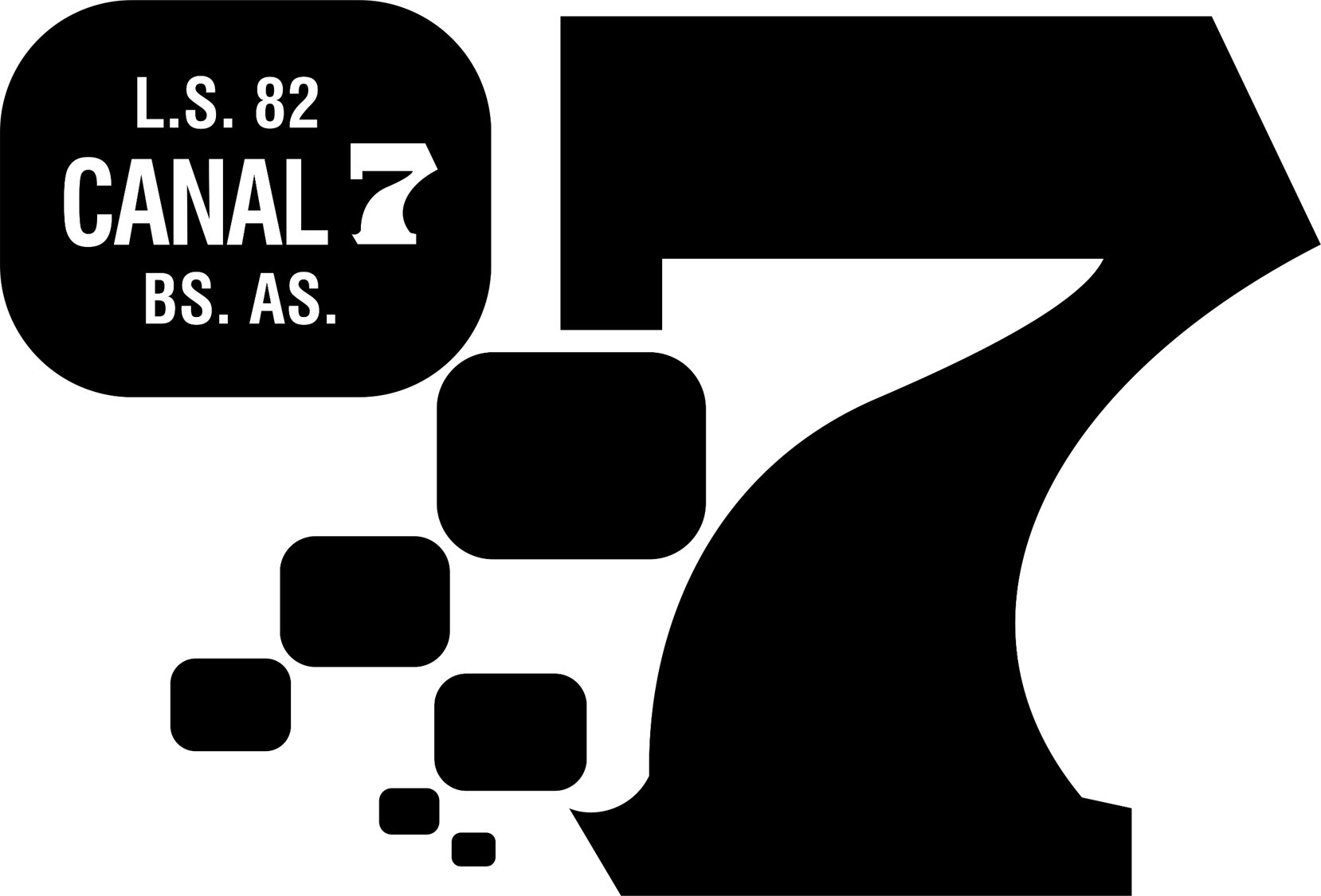
1962

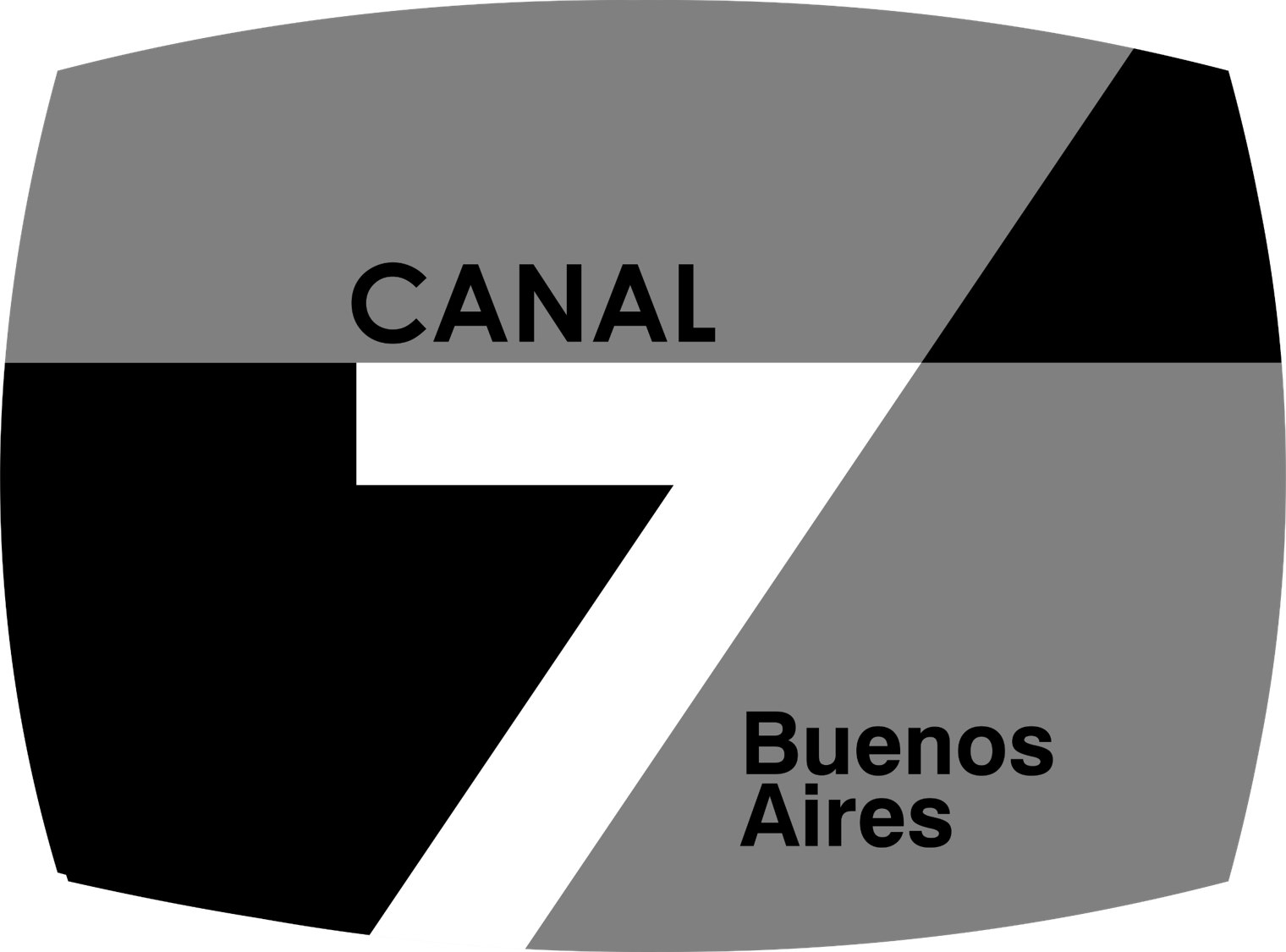
1964

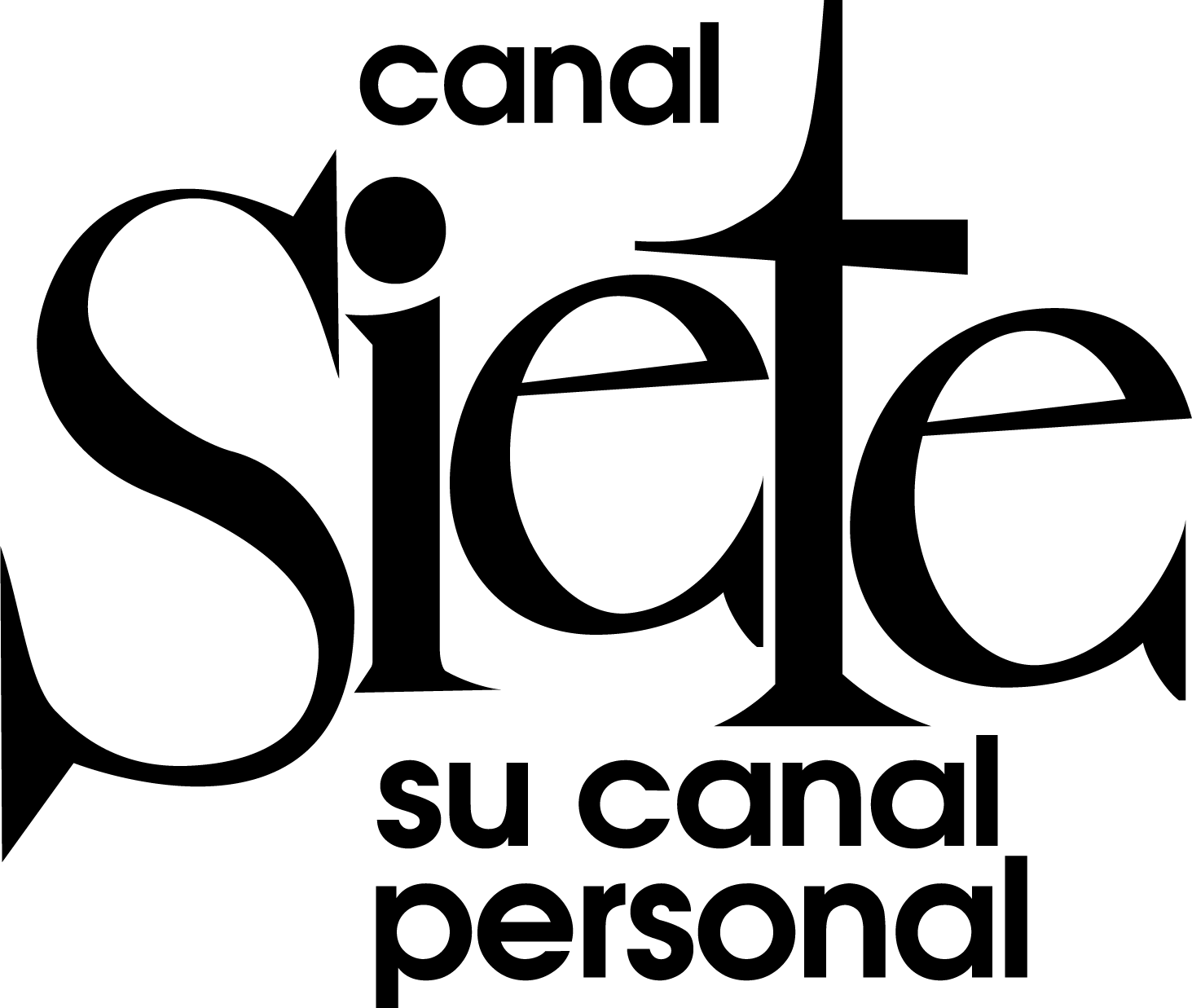
1965

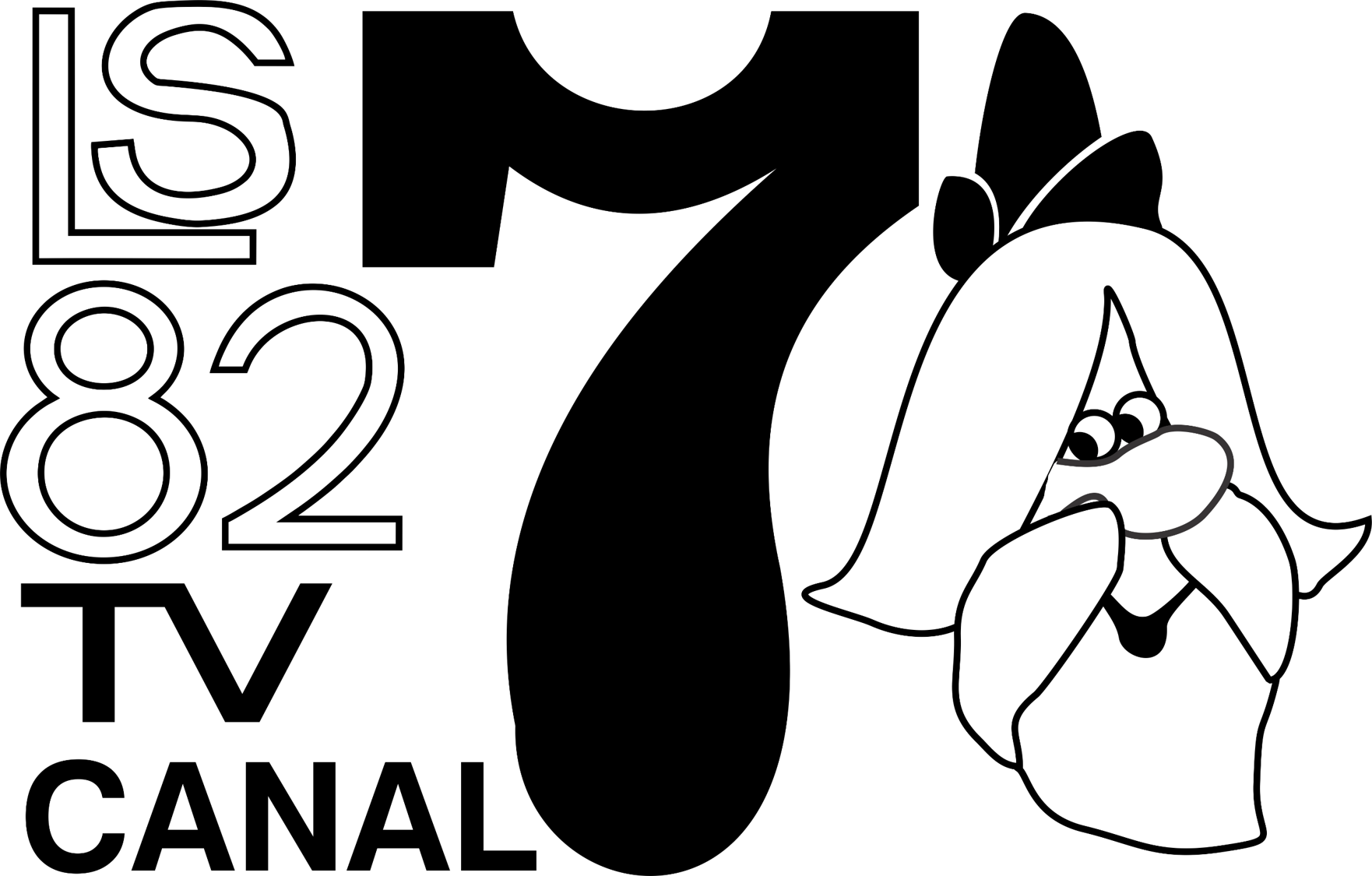
1966

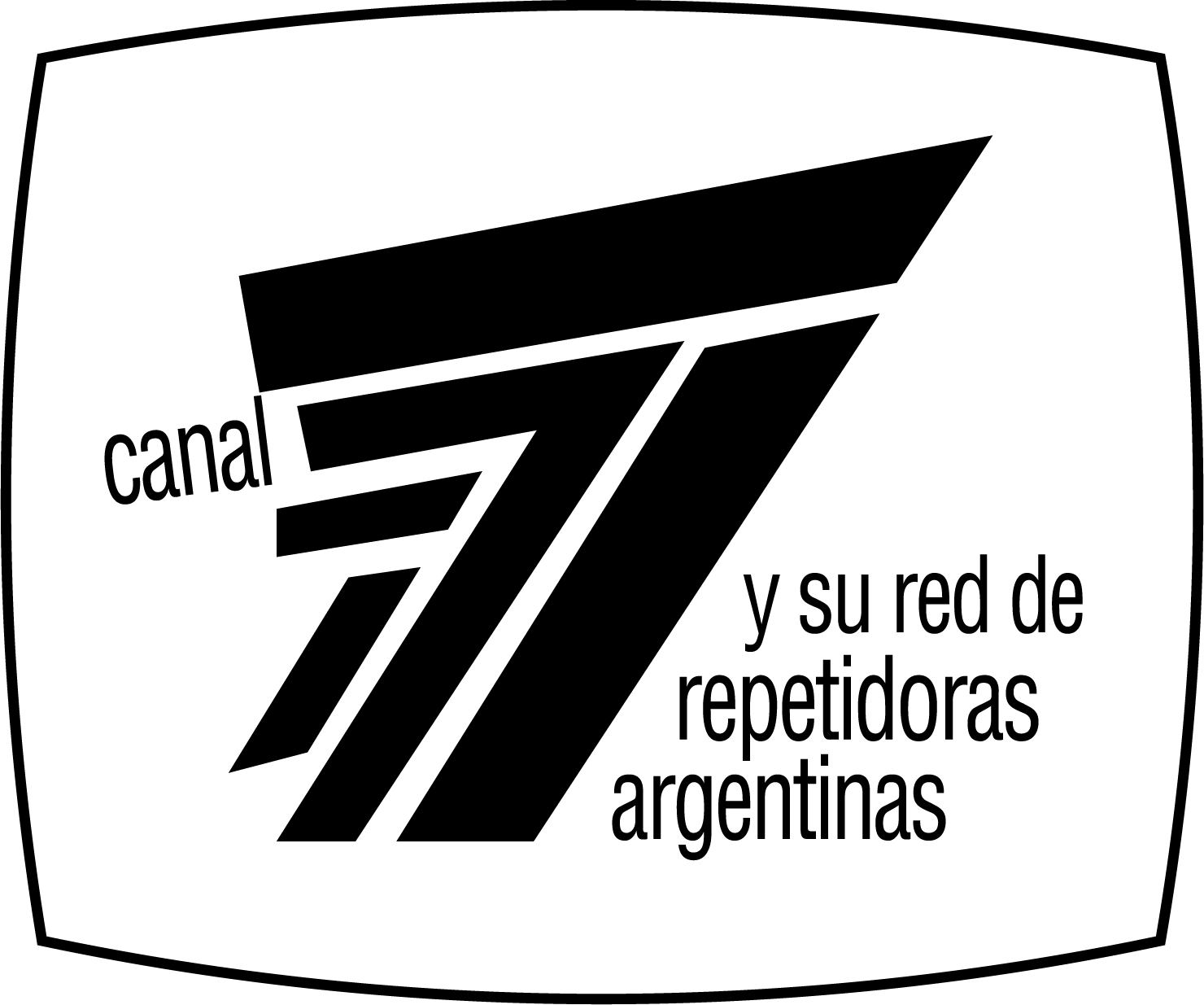
1967

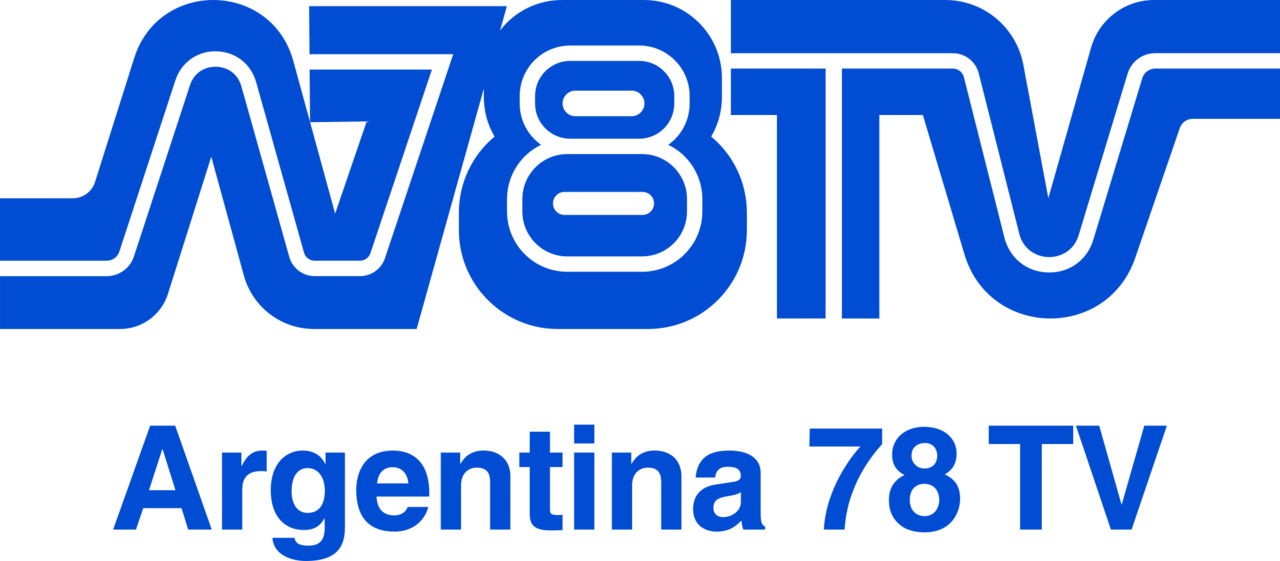
June–July 1978 (during the 1978 World Cup in Argentina)

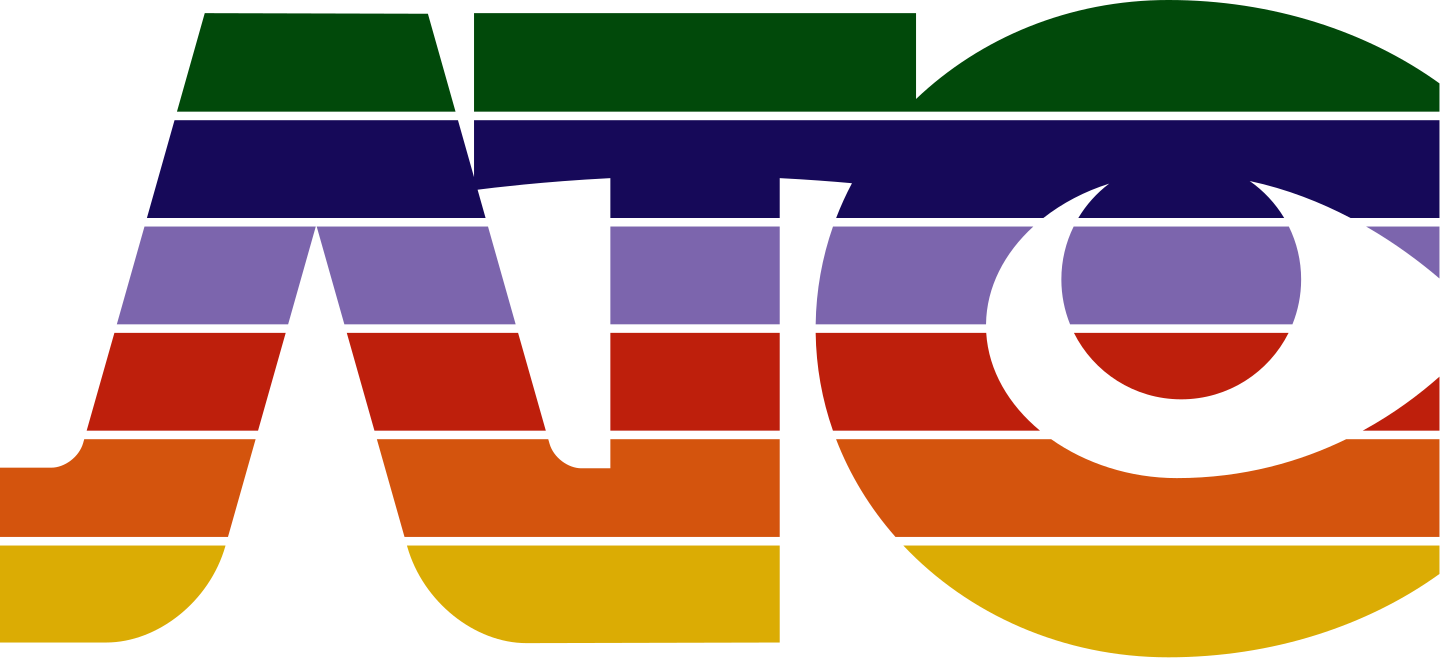
1979–85

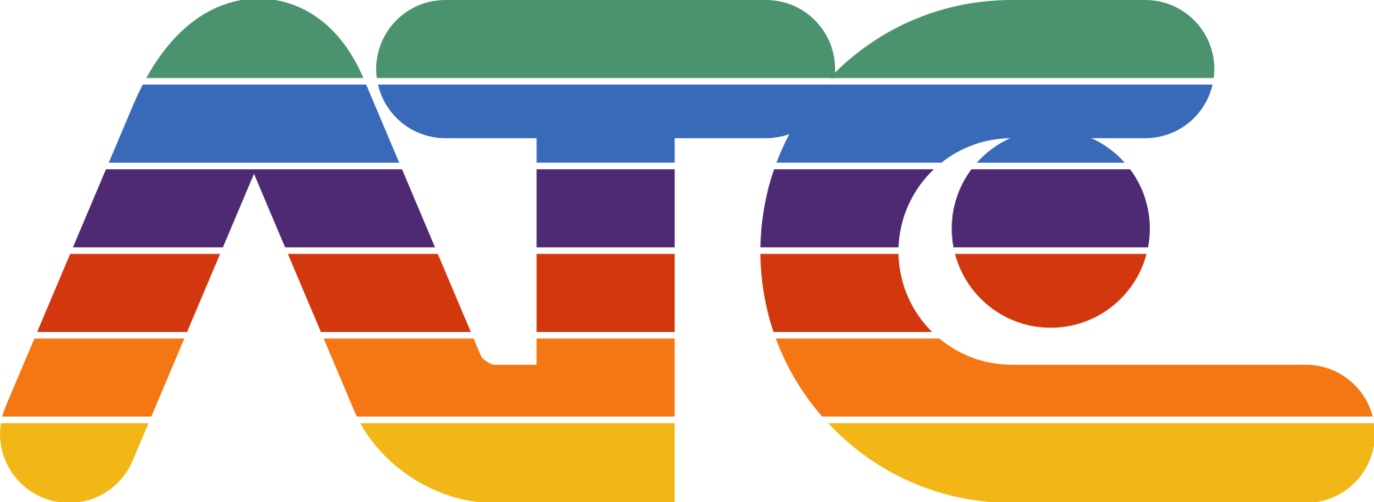
1985–87

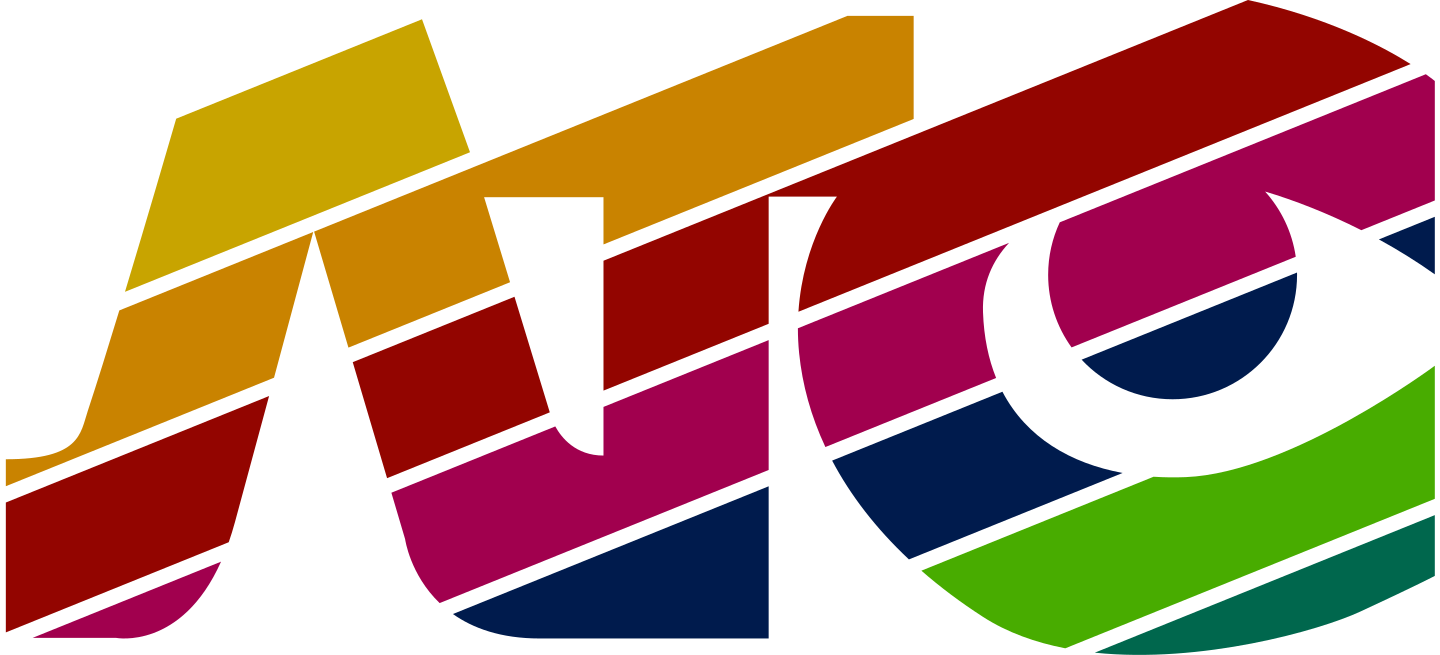
1987 – February 1996, June 1996 – 1998

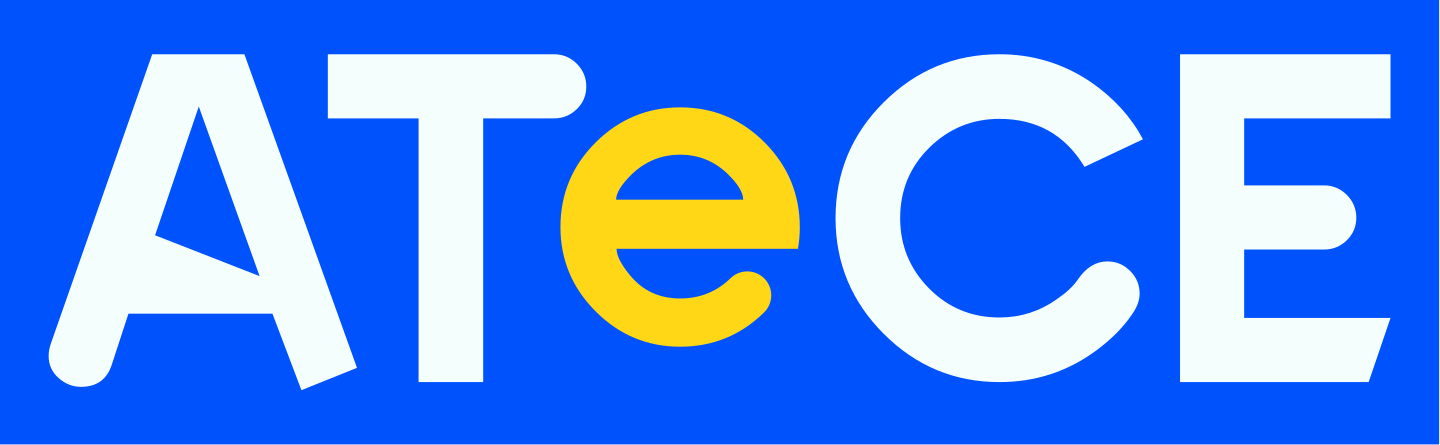
1996 (as ATeCE)

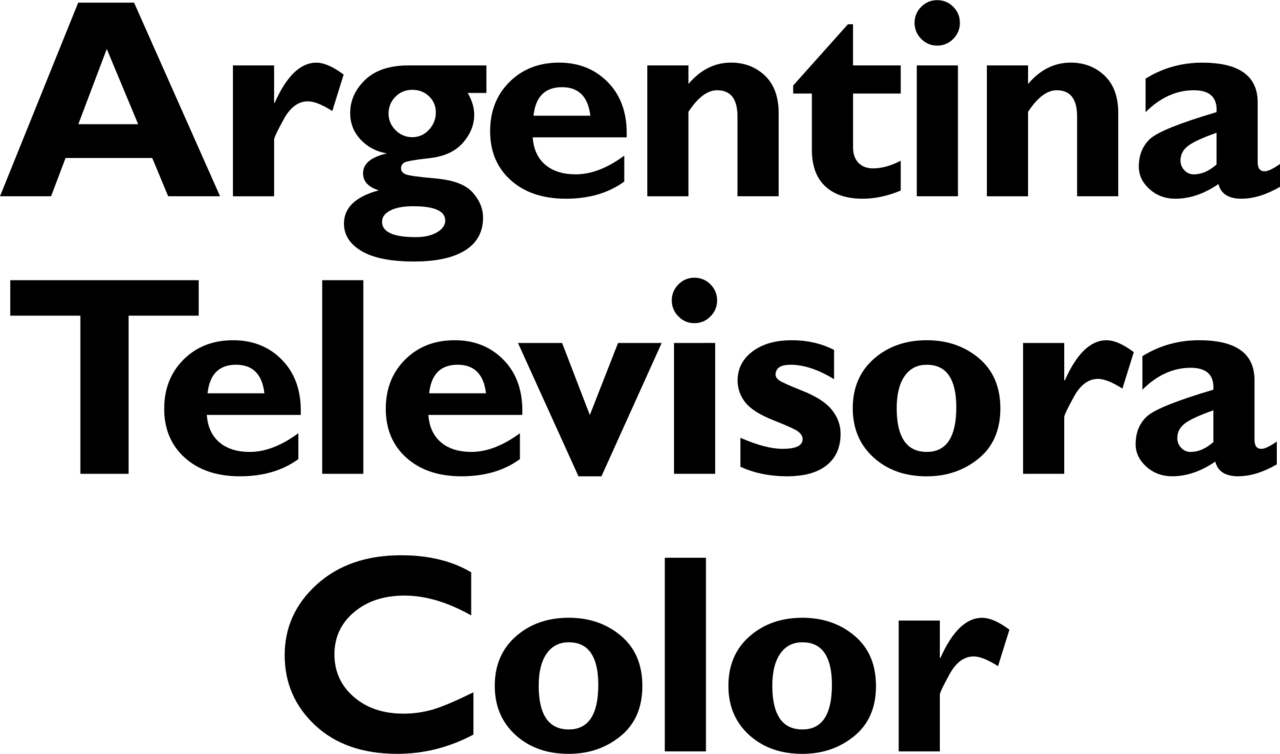
January - May 1, 2000 (without logo)

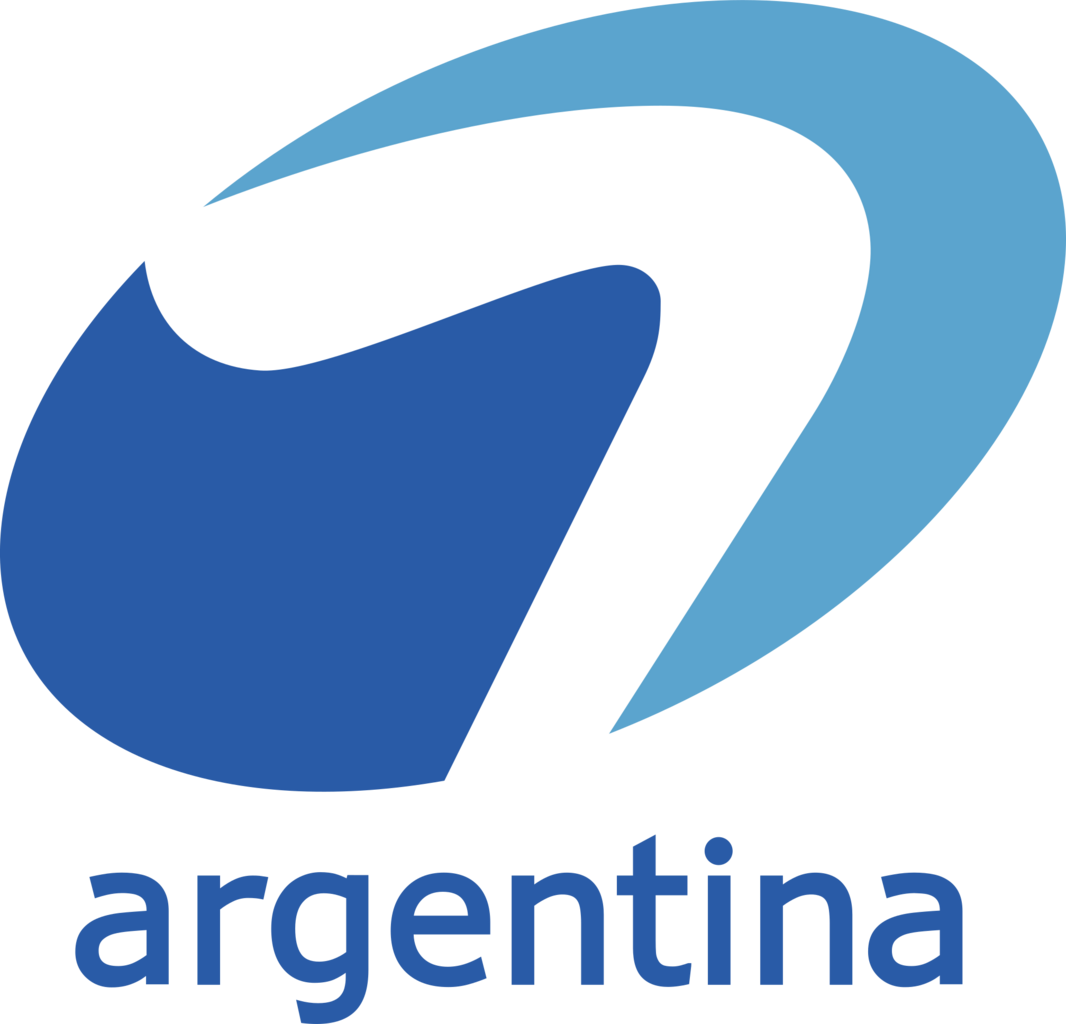
May 1, 2000–02

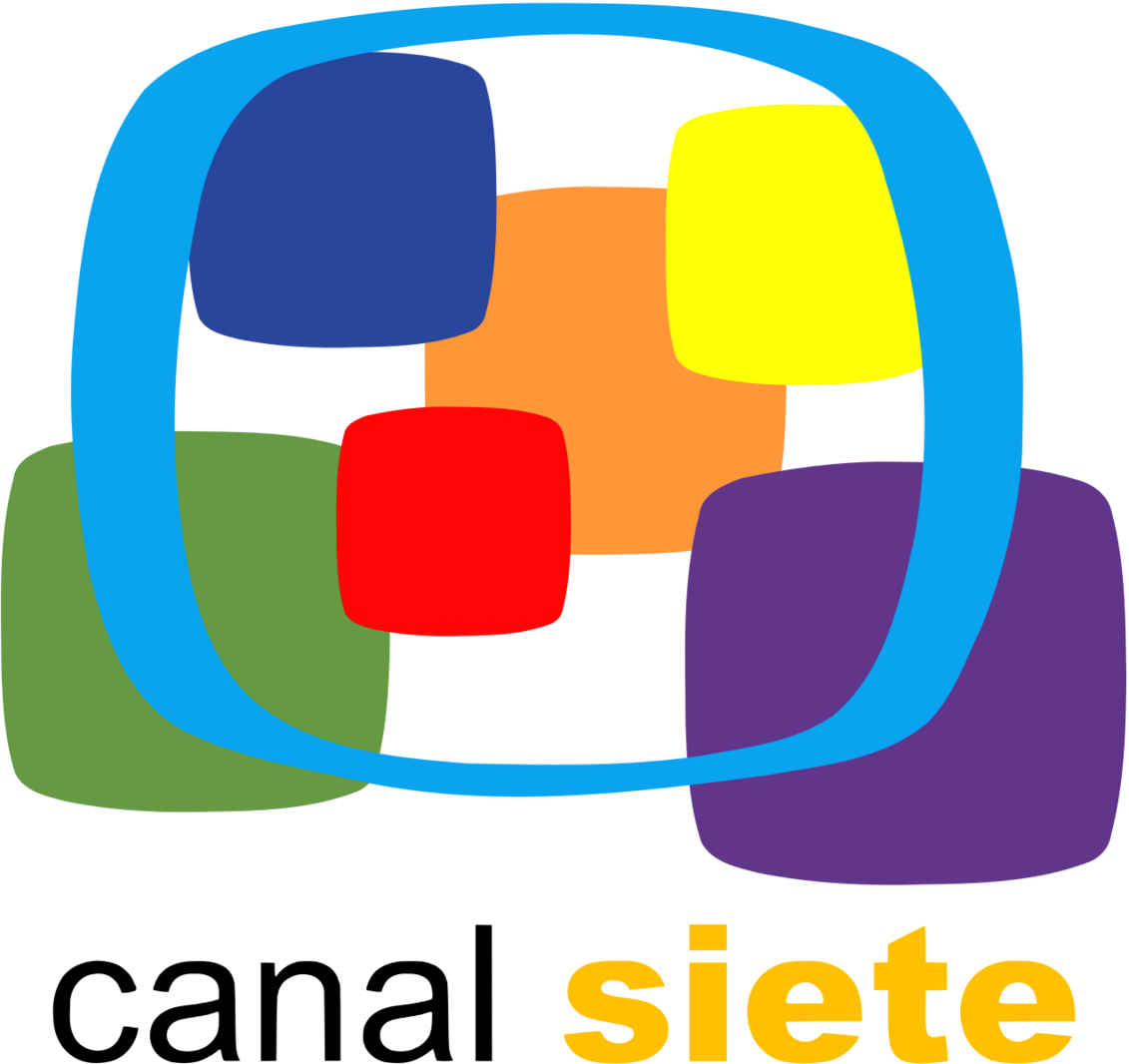
2002–03

2014

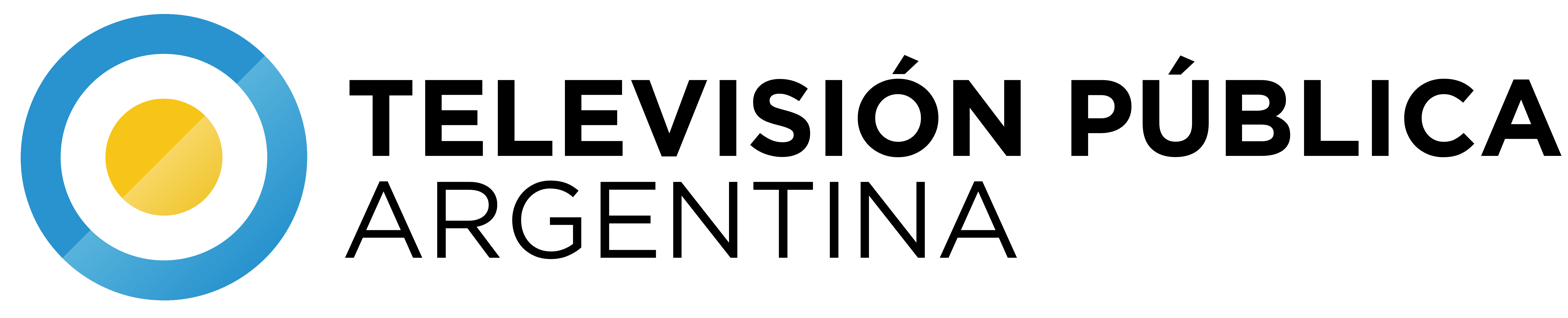
2016–20

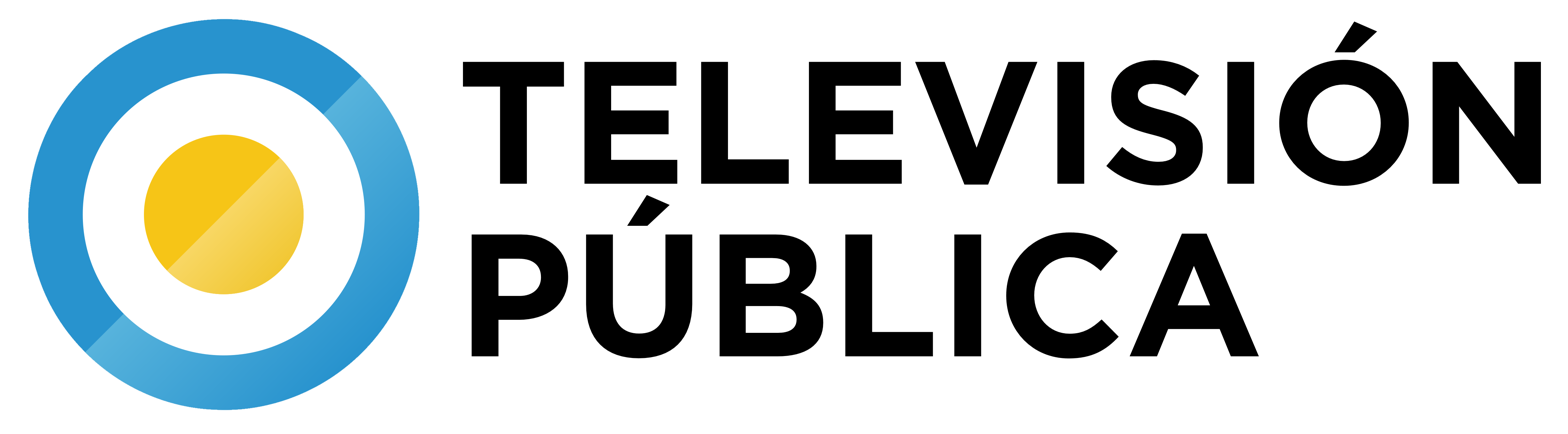
2020–21

2021–26

2024–26

== Programming ==
Televisión Pública Argentina has a varied programming schedule. Its output includes many cultural and educational programs. It also has its own news service, with news programs branded Televisión Pública Noticias (Public Television News), and its program Fútbol para todos (Football for all), which began in 2009-10 season, holds all rights to Argentine Primera División and Primera B Nacional matches until the end of 2016–17 season. 2013 saw the channel surprising viewers with its very first afternoon drama and youth program, and became the first station to simulcast a regional program in 2014.

== Coverage ==
- Argentine Primera División (Only 2 matches released per round)
- Argentina's First Division A Women's Football Championship
- FIFA World Cup Qualifiers
- Copa América (Only Argentina matches)
- Turismo Carretera
- Copa América de Futsal (Only Argentina matches)
- FIFA Futsal World Cup (Only Argentina matches)
- FIFA World Cup
- FIFA Women's World Cup
- Olympic Games
