= Televisión Pública Pampeana =

LU 89 TV Canal 3
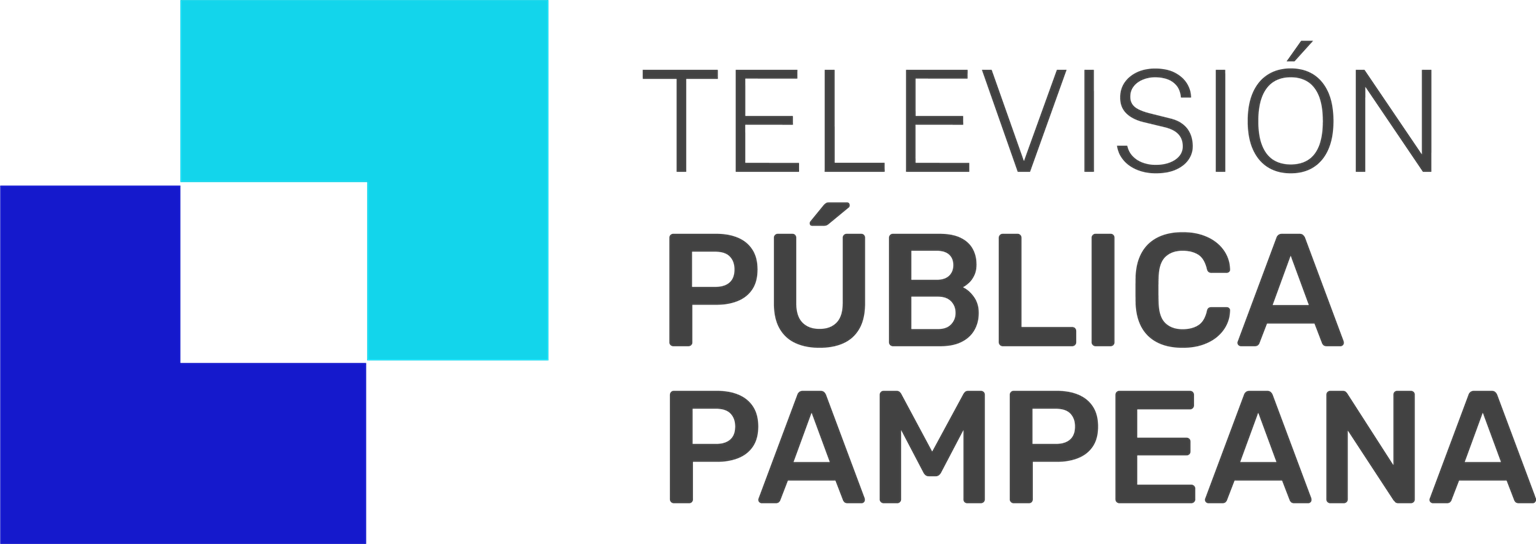
- Santa Rosa, La Pampa; Argentina
- Channels: Analog: 3 (VHF); Digital: 30 (UHF)
- Branding: Televisión Pública Pampeana

Programming
- Affiliations: Televisión Pública

Ownership
- Owner: Government of La Pampa Province

History
- First air date: November 30, 1972
- Former names: Canal 3 (1972-2022)

Technical information
- Licensing authority: ENACOM

Links
- Website: tvpp.lapampa.gob.ar

Channel 3 of Santa Rosa, better known as Televisión Pública Pampeana and stylized as TVPP, is an Argentine over-the-air television station that broadcasts from the city of Santa Rosa. The station can be seen in a large part of La Pampa Province through repeater stations. It is operated by the provincial government.

== History ==
On September 8, 1969, through Decree 5068, the National Executive Branch awarded the provincial government a license to exploit the frequency of Channel 3 of the city of Santa Rosa, capital of the province of La Pampa.

In 1971, through Provincial Decree 2239, it requested approval of the station's regulations.

The license began its regular broadcasts on November 30, 1972 as LU 89 TV Channel 3 of Santa Rosa.

At that time, the material to be transmitted arrived by air and the media workers had to go look for it when the Aerolíneas Argentinas plane arrived. That being the case, it was deferred information, that is, it dealt with events from the previous day. Abel Cuenya was the first director of the channel and at the end of the 70s and beginning of the 80s, the traditional "barrileteada" was celebrated on the station's premises.

Several companies were in charge of supplying the videotapes to the inland channels, where movies, news programs and even soap operas were broadcast that were purchased for the enjoyment of local citizens.

The channel's mascot was represented as the "pumita" and the slogan El canal de la familia pampeana.

The defunct Radio Broadcasting Law, implemented by the last military dictatorship, granted the power to the Pampas signal to transmit the matches of the Argentine soccer team, as well as any other important event of magnitude.

In 1978, the provincial government and the State decided to install a series of repeaters from Bahía Blanca in the southwest of the neighboring province of Buenos Aires to Santa Rosa to broadcast live the matches of the World Cup soccer match that was played in Argentina.

In those years, Channel 3 already had updated technology of the time and was prepared to receive the color signal. However, television in Argentina was still broadcast in black and white. This situation would only change in May 1979.

The link had around 6 repeaters, so no hop could be cut because otherwise the transmission to all locations would be interrupted. Such a situation required having an employee in each repeater, who was in charge of turning on the generating set and starting the equipment. It was almost artisanal work, according to the possibilities posed by the time.

Technology was advancing, and in 1985 Closed Circuit Television began to appear. The first in the province was Canal 2, which was later joined by Pampa TV and later they emerged in other locations in the province.

As of 2021, there are still companies or cooperatives that provide closed-circuit service and continue to operate in some towns in the interior of the Pampas. The provincial government continues to insist on the same path, and as an example we can cite the creation of the Empresa Pampeana de Telecomunicaciones S.A.P.E.M. (EMPATEL).

In May 1998, Channel 3 began broadcasting via satellite.

In June 1999, through Resolution 11793, the Ministry of Communications authorized Channel 3 to carry out tests on Digital Terrestrial Television under the ATSC regulations (regulations that were established through Resolution 2357 of 1998). For this purpose, Channel 4 was assigned to it in the VHF band.

The Federal Authority of Audiovisual Communication Services, through resolutions 445 of June 9, 2011 and 689 of June 24, authorized Channel 3 to carry out tests on Digital Terrestrial Television under the ISDB-T standard (adopted in Argentina through Decree 1148 of 2009). For this purpose, Channel 30 was assigned on the UHF band.

In August 2012, Canal 3 started digital broadcasts on channel 30.1 in Santa Rosa.

The channel changed its logo on the date of its 44th anniversary.
