= Encuentro =

Argentine educational television channel

- Buenos Aires; Argentina
- Channels: Digital: 22.01 (UHF)
- Branding: Encuentro

Ownership
- Owner: Argentine Ministry of Education
- Sister stations: Canal Siete; Pakapaka; DeporTV; CINE.AR; TEC; Aunar

History
- First air date: 5 March 2007

Links
- Website: www.encuentro.gov.ar

Encuentro (English: "Encounter") is an Argentine television channel owned and operated by the Argentine Ministry of Education. It began broadcasting in 2007 through cable television operators in the country. It airs as an independent channel and also as a programming block on Canal 7 from Argentina.

== See also ==
- List of documentary television channels
- Darío Sztajnszrajber
