= Pakapaka =

Argentine television channel and website

- logo used since 2025
- Country: Argentina
- Headquarters: Buenos Aires, Argentina

Programming
- Language: Spanish
- Picture format: HDTV 1080i

Ownership
- Owner: Ministry of Human Capital of Argentina
- Sister channels: Canal Siete, Encuentro, DeporTV, CINE.AR, TEC, Aunar

History
- Launched: 17 September 2010; 16 years ago

Links
- Website: pakapaka.gob.ar

Availability

Terrestrial
- Digital UHF: Channel 22.02 (HD)

Pakapaka is an Argentine television channel and website providing shows and original programming intended for children aged 2 to 12 and their families. Launched initially as a programming section in the Encuentro television channel on September 23, 2007, and later as a digital terrestrial television and FTA channel on September 17, 2010, although regular transmissions begun on September 9. It is operated by Argentina's Ministry of Human Capital.

The word paka paka in the Quechuan language means ″hideout″ or ″children's game″, referring to hide and seek. In 2015, they aired shows such as Shaun the Sheep, LoliRock, Minuscule, The Little Prince, Aesop's Theater, Mr. Moon, Ruby Gloom, Magic Planet, Pipi Pupu Rosemary, Dixiland and Pequeñas criaturas cuadradas.

== History ==
Pakapaka began as a children's programming block on the educational channel Encuentro, and later became the country's first public and educational children's channel. As an educational channel, it belonged to the Ministry of Education of the Argentine Republic. It was launched by President Cristina Fernández de Kirchner as part of the then-current communications policy in place at the time and in compliance with the media law that required a portion of programming to be geared towards children.

Its first test broadcast was on September 9, 2010, and from September 17, 2010, via Open Digital Television, available free of charge to all cable operators The next year it was included in the DirecTV lineup from 7 a.m. to 7 p.m.

In January 2014, Pakapaka began to be offered in Cablevisión's basic package lineup, following repeated requests for the application of Article 65 of the Audiovisual Communication Services Law, which stipulated that pay-TV providers must include all public broadcasters and channels of the national government, as well as all those in which the government has a stake, in their lineup. This increased the channel's reach to over 3 million subscribers.

In February 2015, DirecTV added Pakapaka to its 24-hour channel lineup, along with other state-run channels such as INCAA TV and DeporTV (Argentina). This followed approximately eighty complaints filed by its own viewers with the Ombudsman's Office. According to an official statement from the Ombudsman's Office, 50 of the 80 complaints were related to the inclusion of Pakapaka.

One year after Mauricio Macri won the presidency, in November 2016, the channel's aesthetics were changed, including its logo and slogan. On December 7 of that year, decree 1222/16 was enacted, incorporating Pakapaka, along with the Encuentro, DeporTV, Acua Mayor and Acua Federal channels, as well as the Argentine Universal Audiovisual Content Bank (Bacua) into the Federal System of Public Media and Content, creating the state-owned company "Contenidos Públicos S.E." with the purpose of carrying out the management, operation, development and exploitation of these signals and any others that replace them or are created within the System.

In 2018, the channel was excluded from the basic package of Cablevisión to the cable operator's digital package, which generated controversy and rejection from subscribers.

In 2020, in the context of the suspension of in-person classes due to the COVID-19 pandemic in Argentina, an agreement was reached between Flow (Argentina) and the Federal System of Public Media and Content to return the channel to the lineup.

=== Milei Era and Relationship (2023–present) ===
Following the election of Javier Milei as president of Argentina in 2023, the Law of Bases and Starting Points for the Freedom of Argentinians was approved in June 2024. A month later, Decree 644/204 provided for the conversion of State-owned companies into the new form of Single-Member Public Limited Company. Thus, the former "Contenidos Públicos S.E." became "Contenidos Artísticos e Informativos S.A.U." In August of the same year, a new visual identity was launched for the channel.

On May 22, 2025, the new programming for July of that year was announced, highlighting the acquisition of series such as "Tuttle Twins" and classic anime such as "Dragon Ball Z", "Dragon Ball GT", "Dragon Quest" and "World Trigger". The programming rebranded and premiered on August 17th of the same year.

== Programming ==
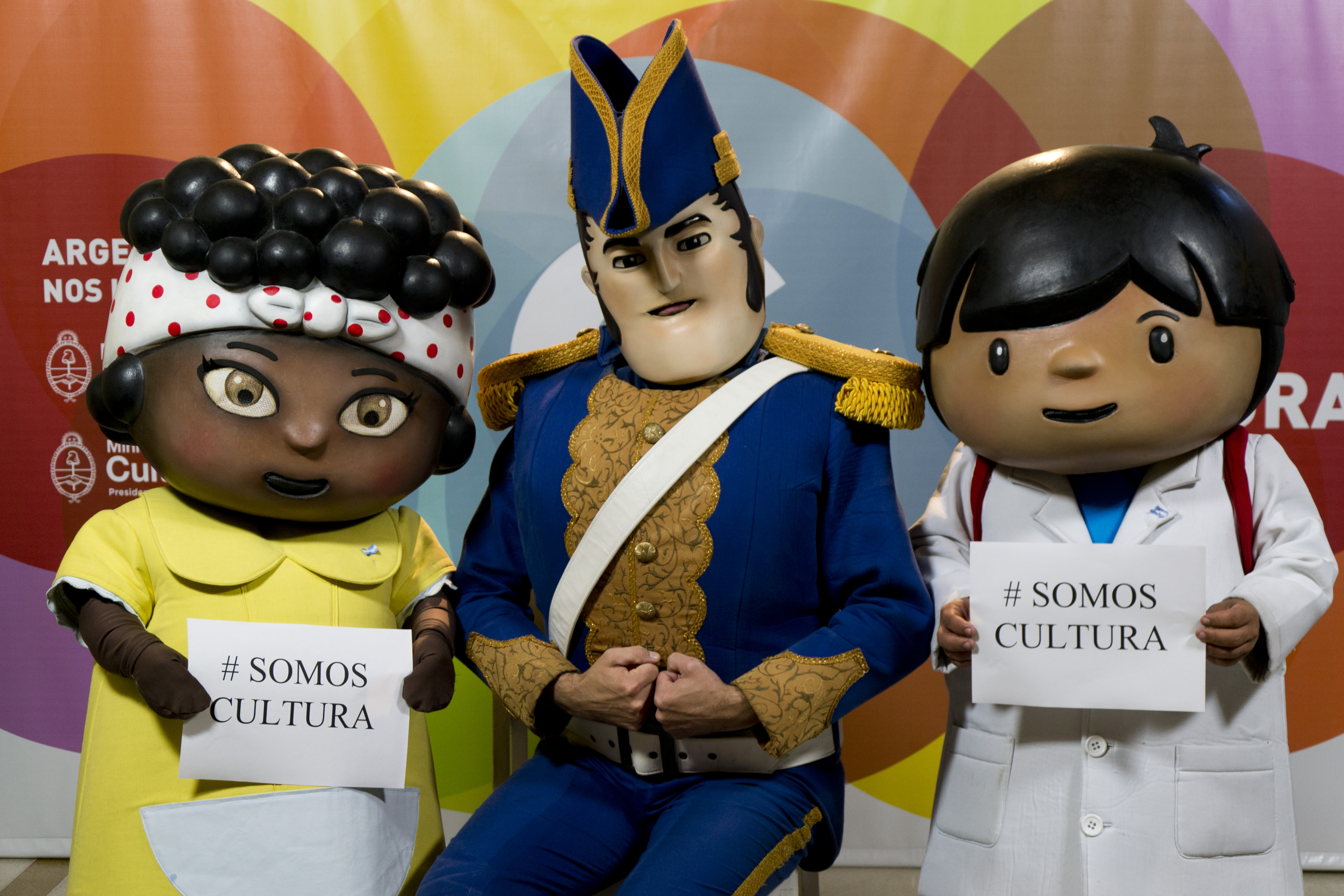
Depicted are Zamba (right), José de San Martín (center) and Niña (left) during a celebration commemorating the May Revolution.

The channel broadcasts 24 hours a day. Its programming is divided in two blocks. The first block, called Ronda Pakapaka, is aimed for children aged 2 to 5 years old (preschoolers), and contains the following programmes:

- Los mundos de Uli
- Medialuna y las noches mágicas
- Molly (Die kleine Monsterin)
- Soli y Lu
- Tincho

The second block, intended for children of ages 6 to 12 years old, contains the following programmes:

- + pelis
- Annedroids
- Amigos
- Biblioteca infinita
- Cachorros de zoo
- Cazadores de sonidos
- Chambi y Max, refugio animal
- Cineclub Pakapaka
- Ciro Todorov
- Ciencia zapata
- Cuentos de había una vez
- Cuentos de terror para Franco
- Cuentos muy, muy exagerados
- Caidos del mapa
- Dragon Ball Z
- El asombroso mundo de Zamba
- El capitán Nariz de lata
- En globo por el globo
- Experimentores
- Feria de variedades
- Familia pampa
- Fungi (cancelled in 2013)
- Gen Z
- Hostal Morrison
- Horacio y los plasticines
- Horrible Histories (cancelled in 2014)
- Inteligencia Animal
- Ideas Rompecraneos
- Jasmine & Jambo
- Kikirikí
- La asombrosa excursión de Zamba
- La casa de la ciencia
- Listo el pollo
- The Little Orchestra
- Mi Genial y Fantástico Sasquatch
- Minimalitos
- Misterios Submarinos
- Monstruos rodantes
- The Motorhomes
- Notipakapaka
- Paper Port
- Paprika
- Petit
- Pim and Pom at the Museum
- Polinópolis
- Pompon Little Bear
- Reffi
- Robotia
- Rosarito y sus pizarras mágicas
- School of Roars
- Shaun the Sheep (season 6)
- Siesta Z
- Soñadores
- S.O.S. Mediadores
- Taina y los guardianes de la amazonia
- Tina & Tony
- Tuttle Twins
- Vuelta por el universo

=== Former programmes ===
- Amigos
- Animapaka
- Aquí estoy yo
- Ask Lara
- Autoretrato
- Brillante
- Caja rodante
- Calibroscopio
- Caracoles
- Castle Farm
- Cazurros al cuadrado
- Chambi y Max
- Chikuchis
- Chronokids
- CienciaCierta
- Cocoricó (from season 3)
- Cuando hay equipo
- Cuentos de cachorros
- Cuentos del árbol
- Dale Qué
- De cuento en cuento
- Dinopaka
- Discover Science
- El asombroso juego de Zamba y sus amigos
- El hombre mas chiquito del mundo
- El mundo de los ¿por qué?
- El taller de historias
- El show de Perico
- El show del Dr. W
- Ella, Oscar & Hoo
- Emmy & GooRoo
- Eva
- Extraordinariamente ordinario
- FloopaLoo, Where Are You?
- Fun with Claude
- Hailey y sus amigos
- Horizontes
- Hotell Kantarell
- Inventia
- The Jungle Book
- The Jungle Bunch to the Rescue (season 1)
- La asombrosa excursión de Zamba a la Copa del Mundo
- La asombrosa odisea historica de Zamba y el niño que lo sabe todo
- La gran pregunta
- Los asombrosa visita de Zamba y Nina
- Mami Fatale
- Misión aventura
- Los Moffels
- Moko
- The New Adventures of Figaro Pho
- Pakapaka de película
- Perropatrulla
- Punky
- Rita and Whatsit
- Ruby Gloom
- Scary Larry (Historias horripilantes)
- Shaun the Sheep (season 1)
- Stella and Sam
- SuperInsectos
- Teca en la tele
- Tinga Tinga Tales
- Todo sobre comadrejas (Todo sobre animales)
- Veo Veo
- ¿Y ahora qué?
- Yoko! Jakamoko! Toto!
- Zapa Zapa
- Zoé Kézako
- Zombie Hotel
