= Laguna Blanca, Formosa =

Coordinates: 25°06′S 58°16′W

Laguna Blanca (Formosa)
- Interactive map of Laguna Blanca (Formosa)
- Country: Argentina
- Province: Formosa Province
- Time zone: UTC−3 (ART)
- Climate: Cfa

Laguna Blanca (Formosa) is a settlement in northern Argentina. It is located in Formosa Province. It is the birthplace of incumbent provincial governor Gildo Insfrán.
