= DeporTV =

Argentine television channel

- Current logo, used since 2020
- Country: Argentina
- Broadcast area: Argentina; Uruguay; Paraguay; Peru

Programming
- Picture format: HDTV 1080i

Ownership
- Owner: Ministry of Human Capital of Argentina
- Sister channels: Televisión Pública, Encuentro, Pakapaka, CINE.AR, TEC, Aunar

History
- Launched: 12 April 2012; 14 years ago

Links
- Website: deportv.gob.ar

Availability

Terrestrial
- Digital UHF: Channel 24.01 (HD)

DeporTV is an Argentine over-the-air sports channel owned by Contenidos Públicos, S.A. and operated by Secretaría de Medios y Comunicación Pública.

== History ==
The channel was established by Argentine president Cristina Fernández de Kirchner on April 12, 2012, and was initially operating a test service, which became a full-time service on February 21, 2013. The official launch of the channel was held at Tecnópolis and was inserted in the Ministry of Education. Events covered at launch included the Argentine soccer league (Fútbol Para Todos), Copa Argentina, local motorsports, Copa del Rey, the South American Athletics Championships, the ABC Spanish basketball league and original content. At the end of 2013, the channel announced that it would launch its HD feed, reportedly using the bandwidth of a channel that closed, Suri TV.

The contract for the production of over 600 editions of its sports news programs and news flashes ended on January 22, 2016, firing 120 staff. The channel used this phase to introduce a new schedule, to be introduced in March. On December 3, the channel unveiled a new logo.

In July 2020, in conjunction with its new logo, the channel announced a new line-up, following a phase where the channel had years on end without new content. A female announcer was added for channel promos.

At the end of 2024, the channel left its longtime premises at Escuela Mecánica de la Armada and moved to those of Televisión Pública. With this change, one of its studios was now being used for DeporTV's studio-based programming.

== Programming ==
- Punto Turístico Aventurero
- La Aventura del Hombre (Versión Actualizable)
- Fútbol en Vivo: Apto para Todos
- Ovación Alternativa
- New Body Trendy
- Cambio de Hábitos
