= National Route 7 (Argentina) =

Highway in Argentina

National Route 7
- Ruta nacional 7
- Map of the central region of Argentina, showing National Route 7 in red

Route information
- Length: 1,224 km (761 mi)

Major junctions
- East end: RN A001 and 25 de Mayo Highway at Buenos Aires City limits
- RN 5 at Luján; RN 188 at Junín; RN 33 at Rufino; RN 35 at Vicuña Mackenna; RN 8 at Villa Mercedes; RN 147 at San Luis City; RN 147 at San Luis City; RN 40 at Mendoza City; RN 149 at Uspallata
- West end: Paso Internacional Los Libertadores

Location
- Country: Argentina

Highway system
- Highways in Argentina

National Route 7 (full name in Spanish: Ruta Nacional 7 Carretera Libertador General San Martín) is a road in Argentina. It crosses the country from east to west, from the capital (Buenos Aires) to the border with Chile, thus linking the Atlantic coast with the Andes, crossing the provinces of Buenos Aires, Santa Fe, Córdoba, San Luis and Mendoza. It has a total length of 1,224 km (761 mi), of which 367 km (228 mi) (30%) are freeways.

National Route 7 is a branch of the Pan-American Highway, continuing into Chile under the name of Route CH-60.

== History ==
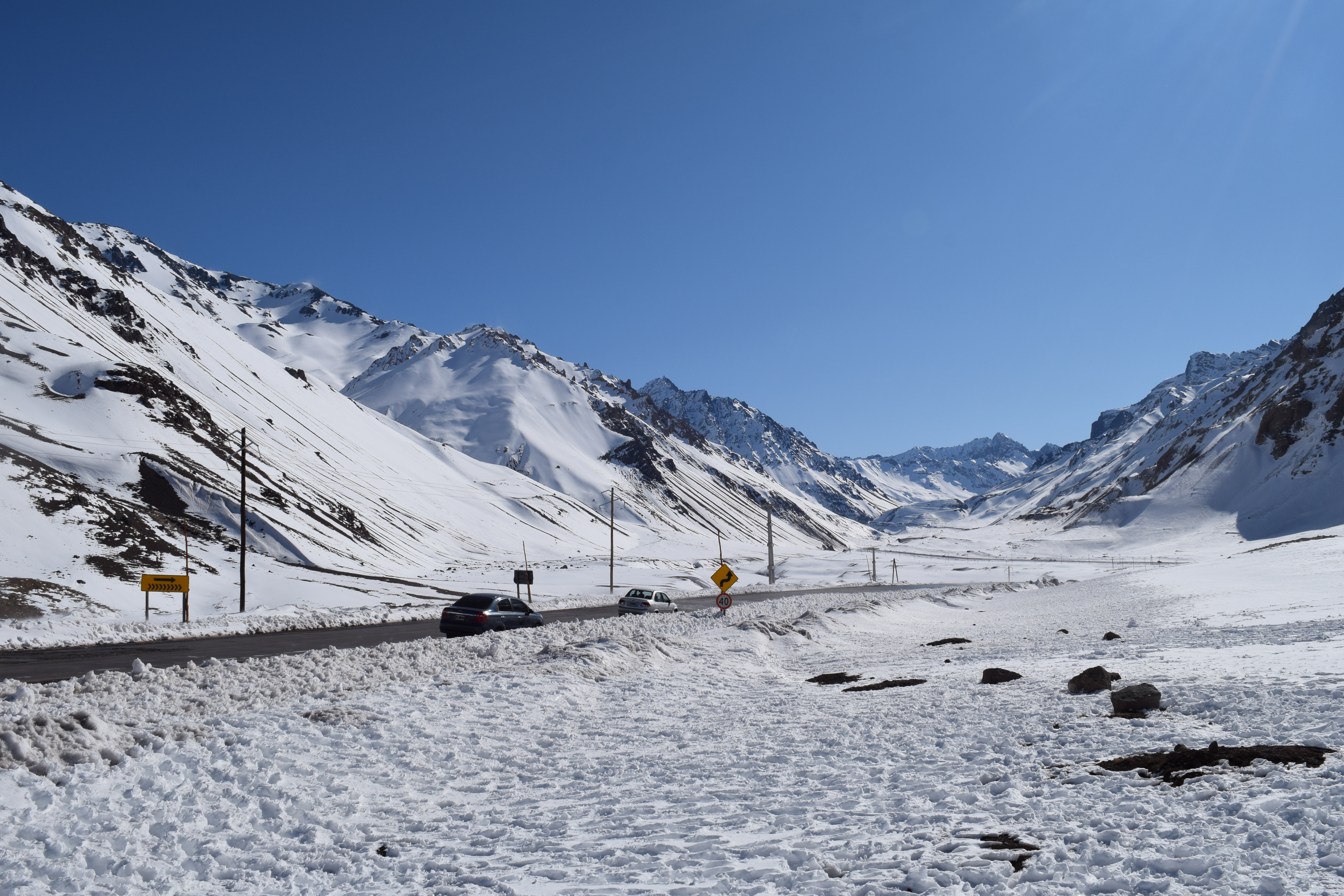
View of the snow-covered route in Aconcagua Provincial Park, Mendoza.

The origins of this route go back to the Western Camino Real, which was used since the colonial era. The Western Camino Real started at Buenos Aires, ran through San Luis and Mendoza, and ended at Santiago de Chile. The road decreased in importance with the introduction of railways at the end of the 19th century.

New settlements sprang up along the route, that were only served by the railway.

With the improvements in automotive travel, the National Congress created the National Highway Directorate in 1932. In 1935, that organisation started work on a new road parallel to a railroad operated by Buenos Aires and Pacific Railway (which later became Ferrocarril General San Martín). This route was given the number 7.

In June 1942, work finished with the paving of the route between Chacabuco and Junín. They built the paved section between Junín and Laboulaye using a slightly different route (a little to the south), which separated the railway from the towns, and sped up the transport on that section. On 2 October 1969, the 67 km between Rufino and Laboulaye was opened, and then the 165 km between Junín and Rufino followed on 28 October of the same year. The paving reached Villa Mercedes in 1975. Here it formed a junction with National Route 8. Route 8 gives the republic's capital access to the east of the country, and has been paved since 1940.

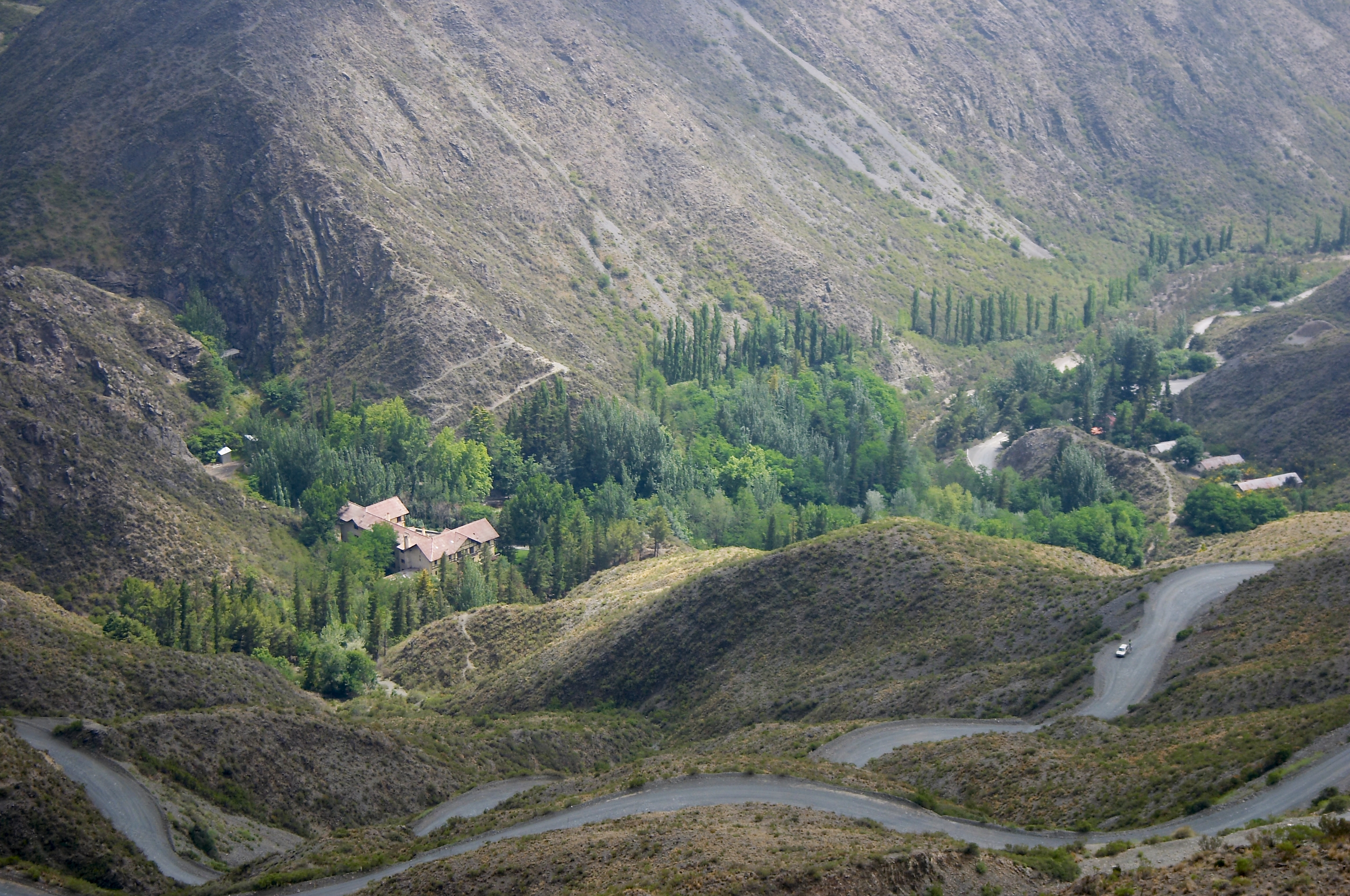
The road at Caracoles de Villavicencio (2007).

To reach Mendoza and Uspallata, the road goes through the "Caracoles de Villavicencio", a mountain section with altitudes of around 3000m, and 365 bends. Due to the danger of this part, they decided to create a new route in 1950. This would run along the banks of the Mendoza River, i.e. to the south of the existing route. The Directorate of National Highways tentatively started work on the new section in 1961, and it was completed in 1971. This took the paved section of road as far as Uspallata.

The next step was to upgrade the road to a highway for the section uniting the cities of San Martín and Mendoza. The work was carried out in two sections of 25 km (Mendoza - Las Margaritas) and 17 km (Las Margaritas - San Martín). The first section was completed in 1977 and the second during 1979. The second stretch included the construction of a new bridge, allowing the road to cross the Mendoza River.

They also designed and built a modification of the original section of the road starting near the Mendozan city of La Paz, diverting it approximately 1.5 km to the north, to pass nearer some towns. These had been considered to be on the old route by the less demanding criteria of the time. The original 140 km section was transferred to the jurisdiction of Mendoza Province, and is now called Provincial Route 50.

In 1979, National Directive 1595 transferred jurisdiction of the old Las Heras - Villavicencio - Uspallata (97.2 km) section to Mendoza Province, and it now forms Provincial Route 52. They also handed over the 53 km section from Luján de Cuyo to Potrerillos which is now Provincial Route 82, and the national orbit road linking the Mendoza section of Route 7 to Uspallata by way of Potrerillos.

The road to the west of Uspallata and its bridges that are in use today was completed between 1978 and 1979.

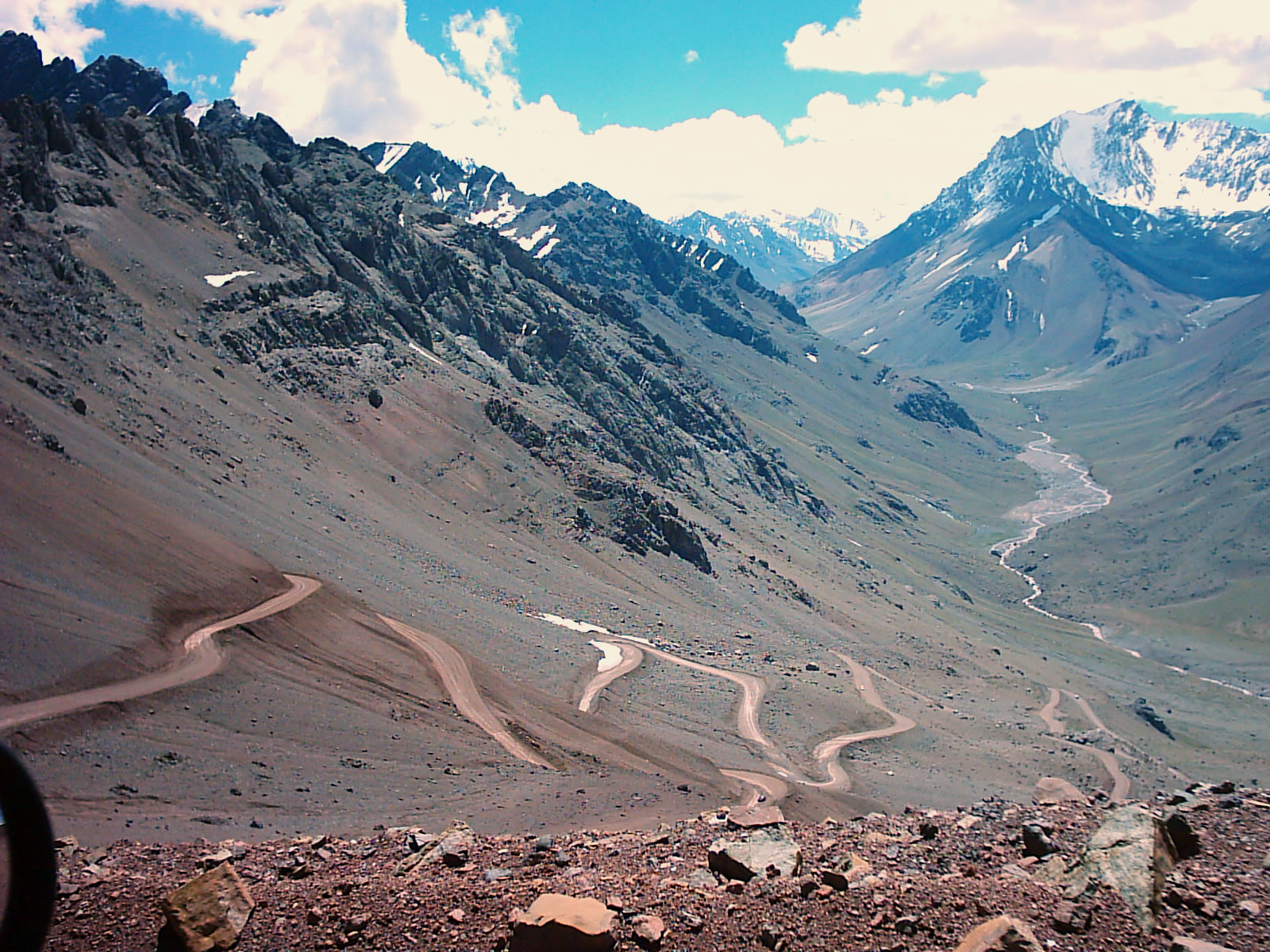
National Route A006, Mendoza. Las Cuevas River is on the right.

Another old section of Route 7 is the part leading to the Chilean border. This is a zigzagging road from Las Cuevas to La Cumbre Pass, where you can see the statue Christ the Redeemer of the Andes. There is a tunnel along the route belonging to the Transandine Railway, dating from 5 April 1910. This opened to mixed traffic in 1977, with the capacity to carry road transport as well as trains. A second tunnel (the Paso Internacional Los Libertadores) opened on 23 May 1980, parallel to the first. Since the new tunnel opened, the road to La Cumbre Pass has only been used for tourist traffic and only opens during the summer. Its current name is National Route A006 (Argentina).

Access from the city of Buenos Aires to Luján was formerly by an avenue circling parallel to the tracks forming part of Ferrocarril Domingo Faustino Sarmiento. The road was known as Avenida Rivadavia as far as Merlo. The government decided to hand this 52.55 km road over to Buenos Aires Province and to construct the Autopista Acceso Oeste 1.6 km (1 mi) to the north. This formed part of the Decree 1595 mentioned above. Buenos Aires Province eventually took it over in 1988, and the section of road became Provincial Route 7.

"Access West", the highway joining Avenida General Paz with Luján, was built in various stages over more than 20 years. It was finally completed on 1 September 1998. The last section joined Avenida General Paz with Morón. Building the road involved demolishing several kilometres of houses, because the road had to pass through the urban zones of Greater Buenos Aires.

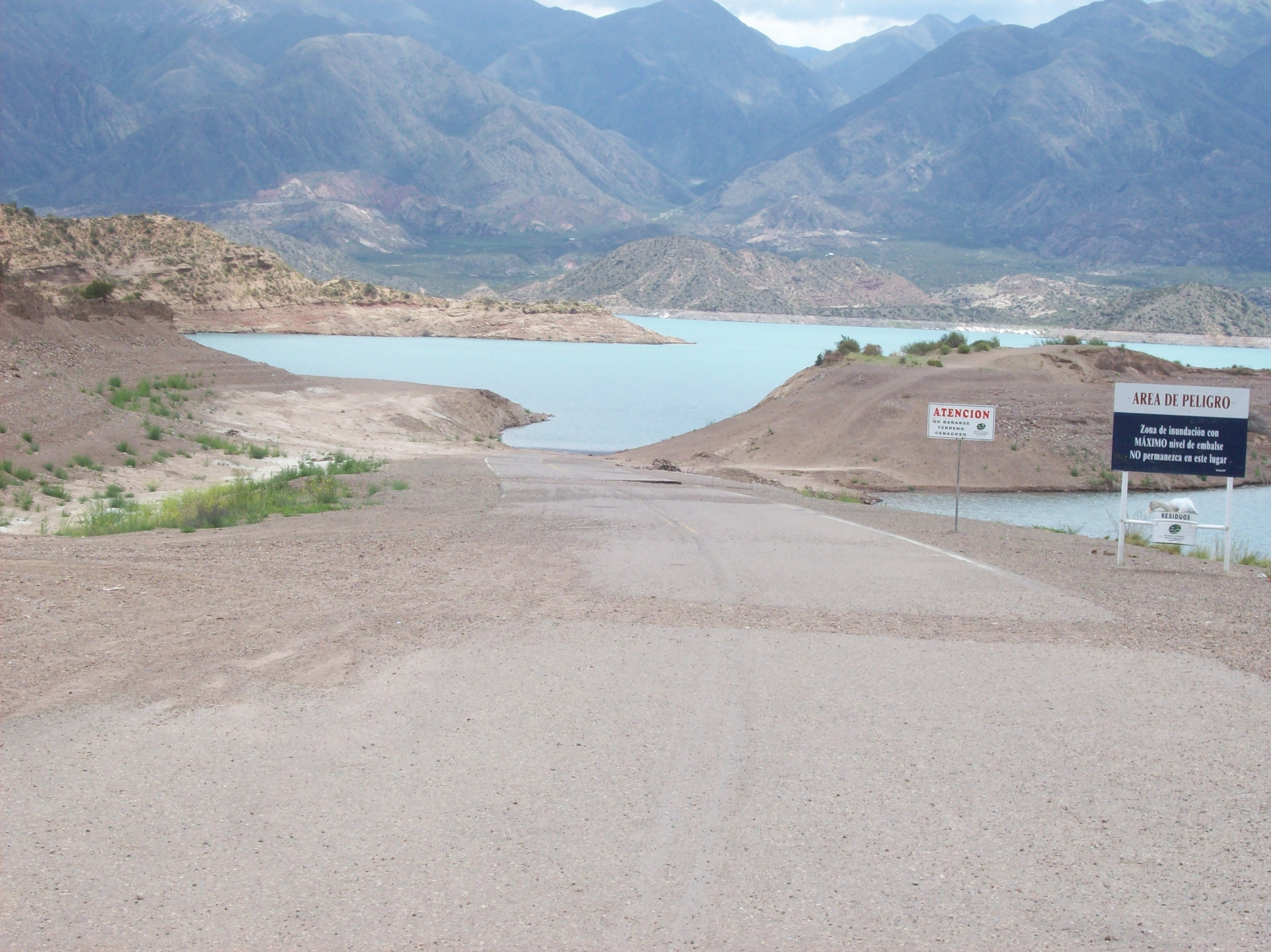
The old section of Route 7 with the Potrerillos Dam.

In May 2001, construction started on the 212 km expressway (incorrectly known as a highway) in San Luis Province. It was funded by the province. It opened on 16 April 2003 and has the distinction of having lights along its entire length. It takes a slightly different route to the original road around the provincial capital and passes further south, i.e. further from the city centre. San Luis Provincial Law No. VIII-0258-2004 calls it "Autopista de las Serranías Puntanas" ("The Foothills of San Luis Highway"). The old 11.6 km section of road that it replaced passed into provincial jurisdiction. The government of San Luis converted it into an expressway which opened on 27 July 2007 as Avenida Parque Gobernador José Santos Ortiz.

Due to the construction of the Potrerillos Dam to the southwest of the city of Mendoza, they decided to build 10 km of road in a higher zone with two road bridges. This section opened on 23 August 2004. This part of the route generated controversy during the planning period because it passed through an important paleontological deposit.

=== The Santa Fe section ===
Laguna La Picasa before the draining work in 2006. The road and the railroad tracks were under water

Due to the growth of Laguna La Picasa (es:Laguna La Picasa) between 1998 and 1999, 14.5 km of the road was flooded. The affected area was between Aarón Castellanos and Diego de Alvear, along the border between the provinces of Santa Fe and Buenos Aires. This prompted the road to be rerouted on 19 April 1999.

The vehicles used a gravel track for 32 km, adding 17 km on to the original length of the road. Then they started to lower the water level in the lake by means of a pumping station in Rufino. That station will be complemented by another (not yet built) to the south of the lake.

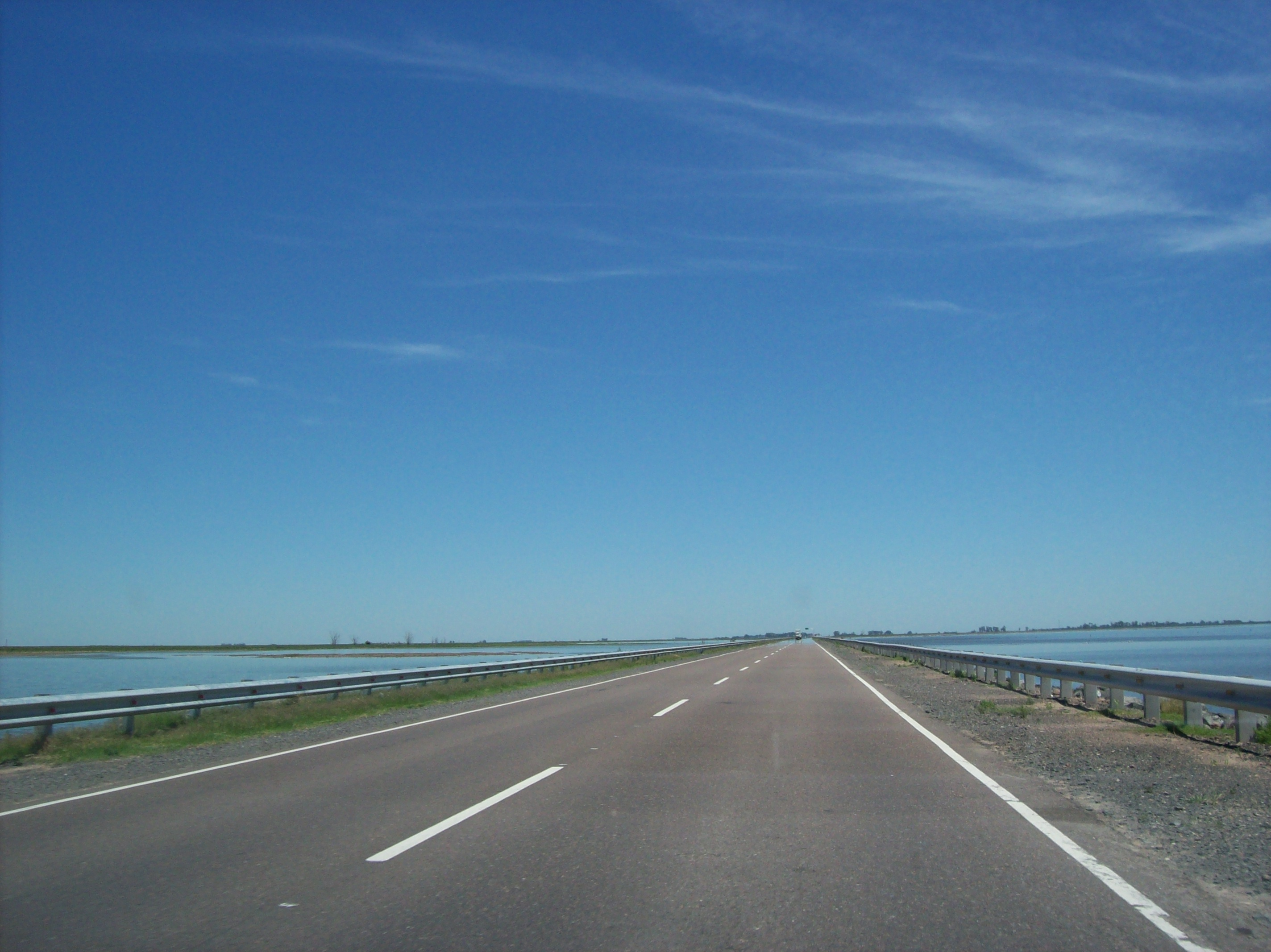
National Route 7 over La Picasa Lake.

Work started to repair the damaged section of road on 1 February 2006. It used stones brought from a quarry in San Luis Province. The stones were coated with mesh. By July 2006, they had joined up to the basalt stones on both sides of the lake. This allowed trucks to use the track, allowing them to continue with the work of raising the road. The road was to be raised 2 metres above the lake's maximum water level. In normal conditions it would be 6 metres above the lake's surface. The work includes a 60 m bridge in the centre of the lake. It is built in three 20 m sections, each with a lane for both directions of traffic.

This 10.5 km section came into use by traffic on 10 June 2007.

The construction was given the 2007 Road Engineering Works award by the Argentina Road Association, which covers all the provinces, industry and National Government sector.

== Cities ==
National Route 7 passes through several cities with a population of greater than 5000. These are listed below.

=== Buenos Aires Province ===
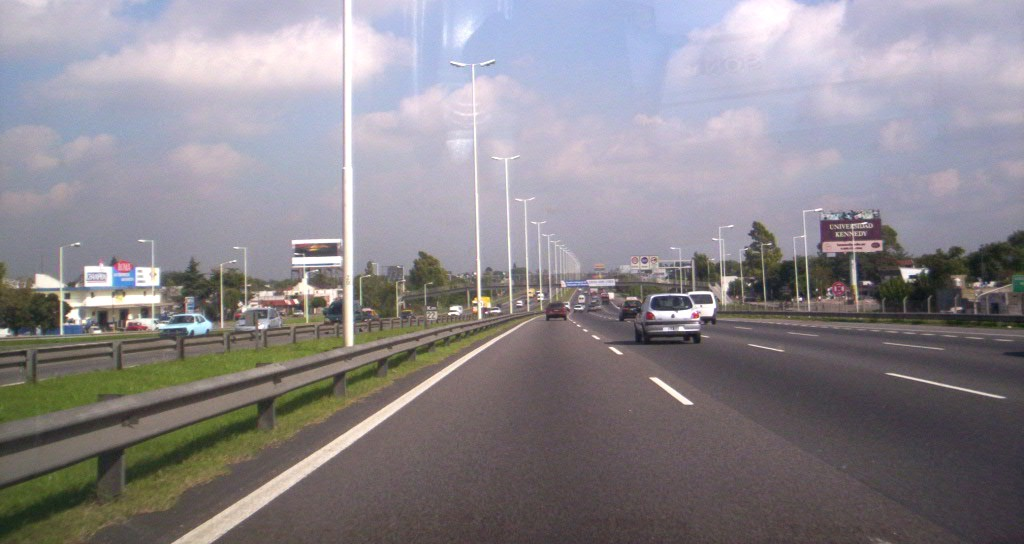
The 22nd kilometre of National Route 7, in Partido de Morón, Buenos Aires. In this section is a freeway with four lanes in each side.

The route runs through 364 km of the north of Buenos Aires Province for km 12 - 376 of its total length. The road passes through the following partidos:

- Tres de Febrero (km 12-15): Ciudadela (km 13).
- Morón (km 15-24): El Palomar (km 17), Haedo (km 19) and Castelar (km 24).
- Ituzaingó (km 24-30): Ituzaingó (km 29).
- Moreno (km 30-44): Paso del Rey (km 32), Moreno (km 37) and La Reja (km 39).
- General Rodríguez (km 44-56): General Rodríguez (km 52).
- Luján (km 56-90): Luján (km 67).
- San Andrés de Giles (km 90-130): San Andrés de Giles (km 103).
- Carmen de Areco (km 130-166): Carmen de Areco (km 138).
- Chacabuco (km 166-237): Chacabuco (km 203).
- Junín (km 237-291): Junín (km 260).
- Leandro N. Alem (km 291-347): Vedia (km 315).
- General Pinto (km 347-376): no settlement with greater than 5000 inhabitants.

=== Santa Fe Province ===
The road runs for 56 km in the extreme south-east of this province. This stretch starts 376 km into the total length, and leaves the province at 432 km.

- General López Department (km 376-432): Rufino (km 426)

=== Córdoba Province ===
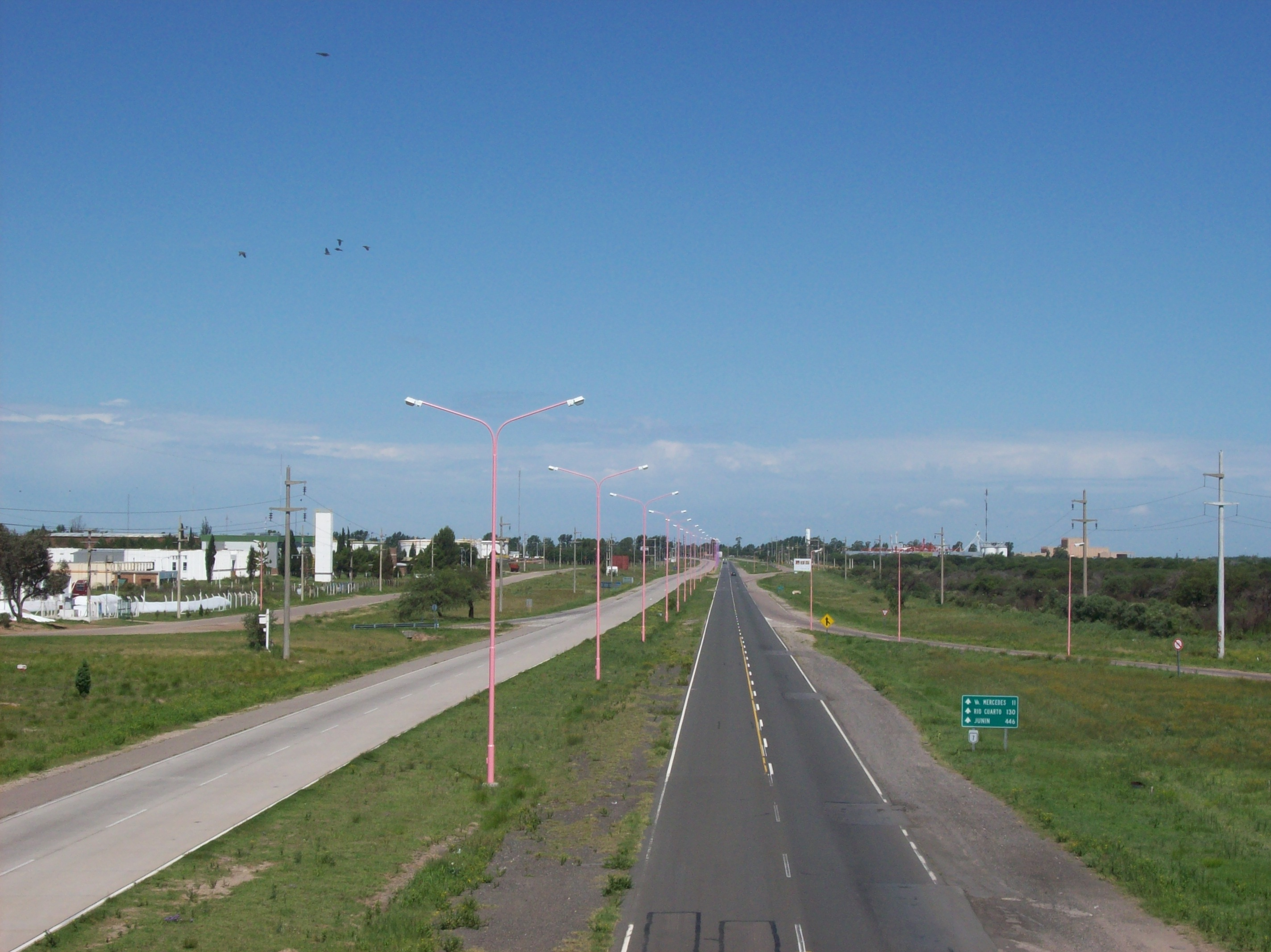
National Route 7, 11 km to the east of Villa Mercedes in San Luis Province.

The road runs for 222 km in the south of Córdoba Province, for kilometres 432-654.

- Presidente Roque Sáenz Peña Department (km 432-551):Laboulaye (km 490) and General Levalle (km 540).
- Río Cuarto Department (km 551-654): Vicuña Mackenna (km 586).

=== San Luis Province ===
The road runs through San Luis Province for 221 km. It passes through the centre of the province for km 654 to 865.

- General Pedernera Department (km 654-730): Justo Daract (km 661) and Villa Mercedes (km 696).
- Colonel Pringles Department (km 730-759): no settlements with population greater than 5000.
- La Capital Department (km 759-865): San Luis (km 788).

=== Mendoza Province ===
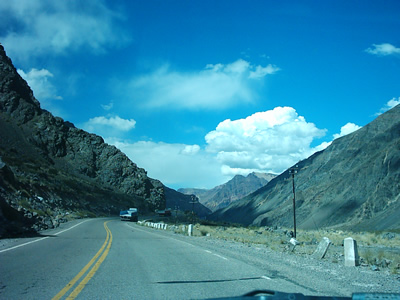
National Route 7 near Uspallata, Mendoza.

The route runs through 372 km of the north of Mendoza Province for km 865-1237.

- La Paz Department (km 865-926): La Paz (km 905).
- Santa Rosa Department (km 926-981): No settlement with more than 5000 inhabitants, except for the capital Santa Rosa (km 966).
- San Martín Department (km 981-1011): San Martín (km 999-1004) and Palmira (km 1007-1012).
- Maipú Department (km 1011-1027): Rodeo del Medio (km 1022).
- Guaymallén Department (km 1027-1040): Rodeo de la Cruz and Villa Nueva.
- Luján de Cuyo Department (km 1054-1139): Perdriel (km 1054).
- Las Heras Department (km 1139-1237): no settlement with greater than 5000 inhabitants. Tourist sites: Uspallata (km 1141), Los Penitentes (km 1212), Puente del Inca (km 1219) and Las Cuevas (km 1232).

In the section overlapping National Route 40, the road passes through Dorrego in Guaymallén Department and Luján de Cuyo in the department of the same name.

== Tollbooths and services ==
The road carries heavy traffic, so there are a lot of service stations along its length. But until 2004, the Junín - Villa Mercedes section did not have any service stations selling compressed natural gas (CNG), so vehicles that relied on this fuel diverted along National Route 8 instead.

=== Buenos Aires Province ===
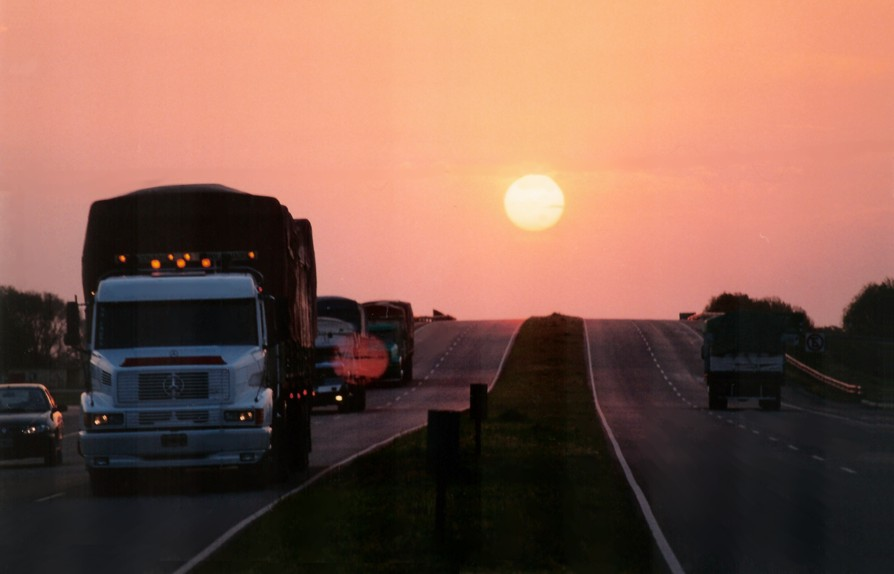
Trucks on National Route 7 Junín.

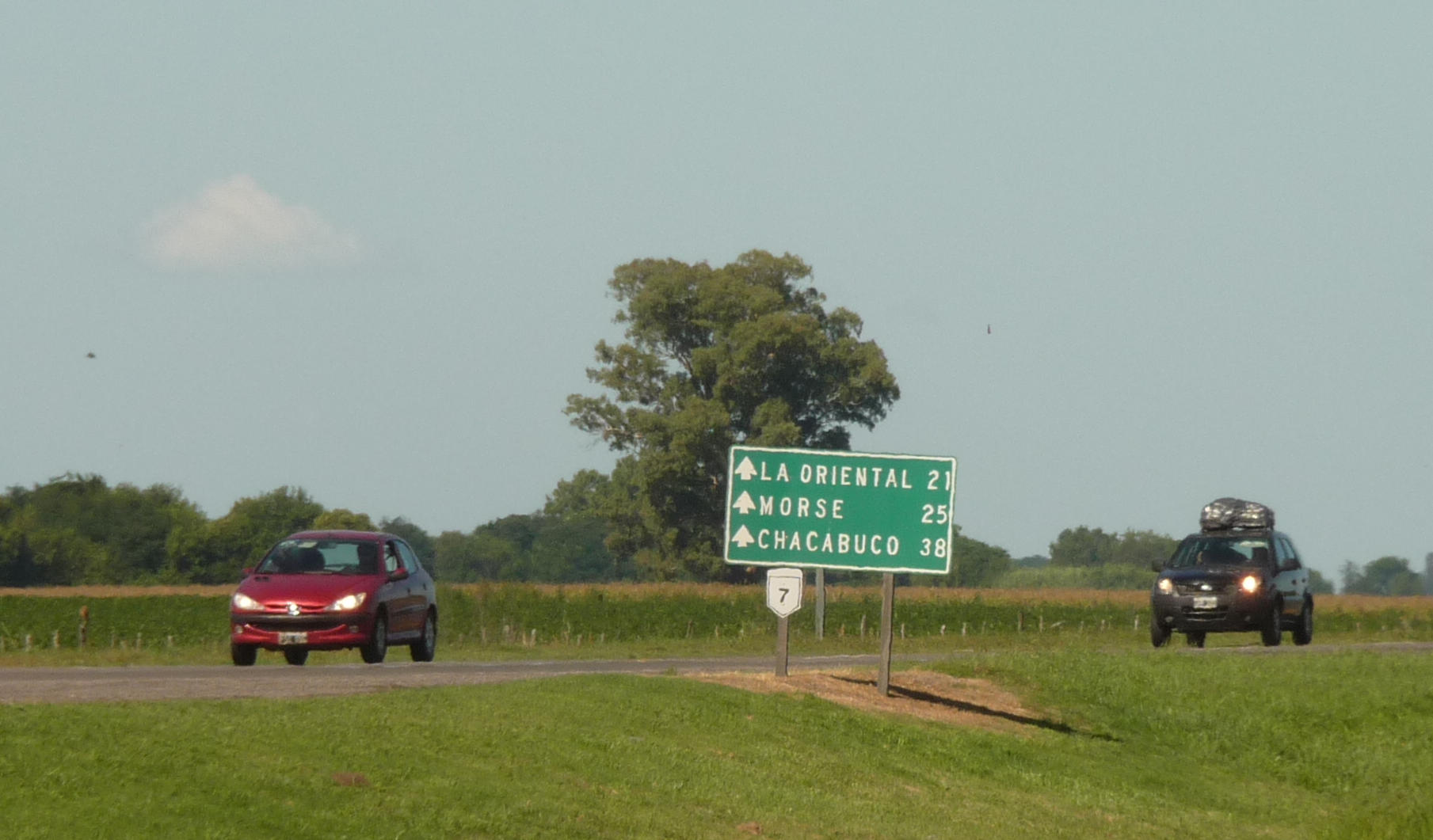
The section of National Route 7 between Junín and Chacabuco.

- km 15/mi 9.32: Shell service station (Ciudadela)
- km 26/mi 16.155: Tollbooth (Ituzaingó)
- km 26/mi 16.155: Shell service station (Ituzaingó)
- km 56/mi 34.796: ACA service station (General Rodríguez)
- km 57/mi 35.418: Tollbooth (Luján)
- km 62/mi 38.525: ACA service station (Luján)
- km 65/mi 40.389: Shell service station (Luján)
- km 87,5/mi 54.369: Tollbooth (Villa Espil)
- km 97/mi 60.272: YPF service station (San Andrés de Giles)
- km 103/mi 64: YPF service station (San Andrés de Giles)
- km 139/mi 86.37: ACA service station (Carmen de Areco)
- km 140/mi 86.991: Shell service station (Carmen de Areco)
- km 140/mi 86.991: Petrobras service station (Carmen de Areco)
- km 212/mi 131.73: CNG service station (Chacabuco)
- km 246: YPF service station (La Agraria)
- km 258: Independent service station (Junín)
- km 258: Esso service station (Junín)
- km 259: YPF service station (Junín)
- km 261: Petrobras service station (Junín)
- km 272: Tollbooth (Junín)
- km 301: Shell service station (Leandro N. Alem)
- km 312: Shell service station (Vedia)
- km 316: CNG service station (Vedia)
- km 342: Shell service station (Juan B. Alberdi)
- km 353: YPF service station (Iriarte)
- km 369: YPF service station (Diego de Alvear )

=== Santa Fe Province ===
- km 425: Shell service station (Rufino)

=== Córdoba Province ===
- km 490: Shell service station (Laboulaye)
- km 490: YPF service station (Laboulaye)
- km 541: CNG service station (General Levalle)
- km 592: Tollbooth (Vicuña Mackenna)

=== San Luis Province ===
- km 657: Tollbooth (Justo Daract)
- km 689: YPF service station (Villa Mercedes)
- km 696: ACA service station (Villa Mercedes)
- km 730: YPF service station (Fraga)
- km 761: Tollbooth (La Cumbre)
- km 783: YPF service station (Bella Vista)
- km 863: Tollbooth (Desaguadero)

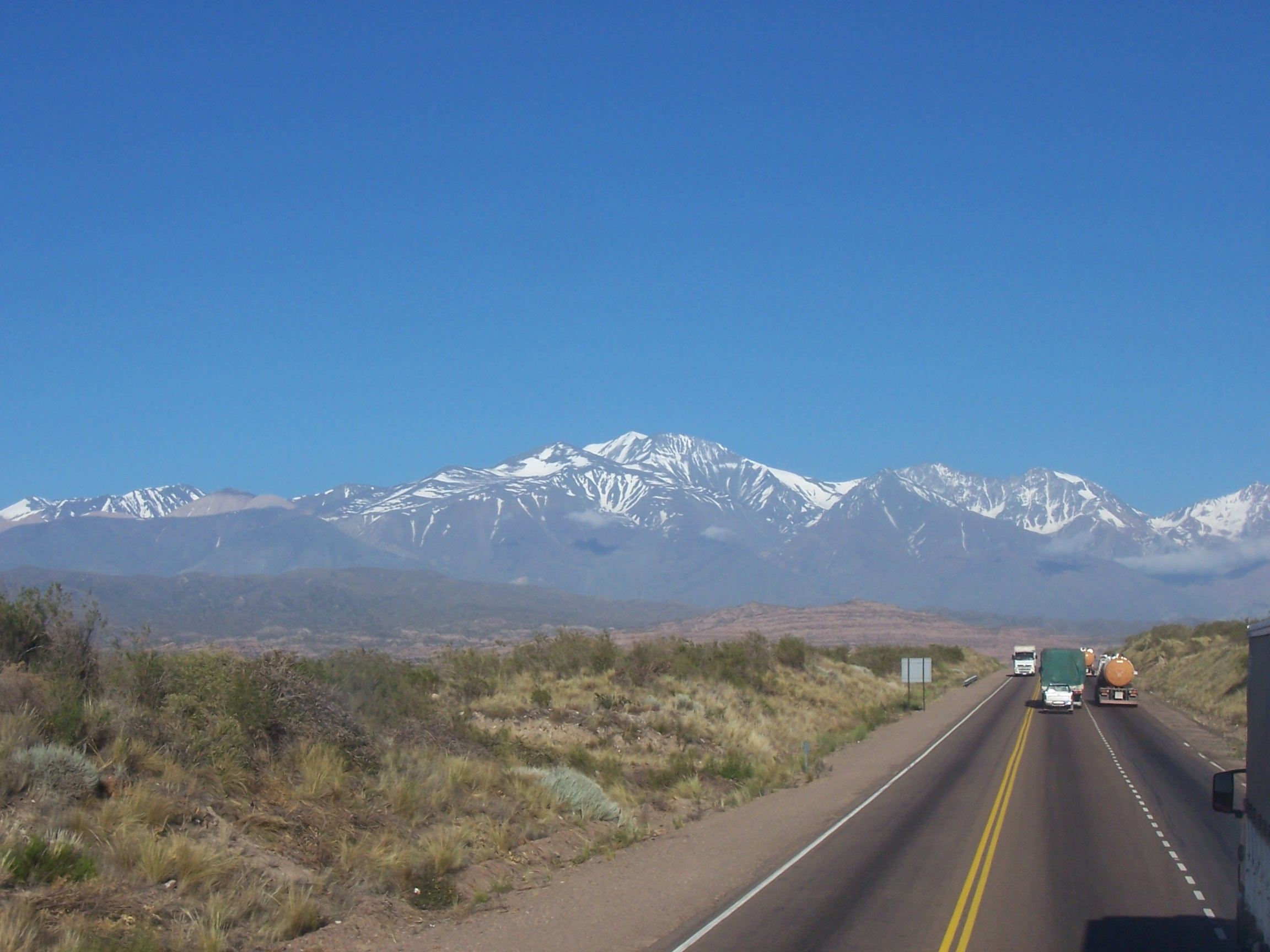
National Route 7 as it passes through Mendoza.

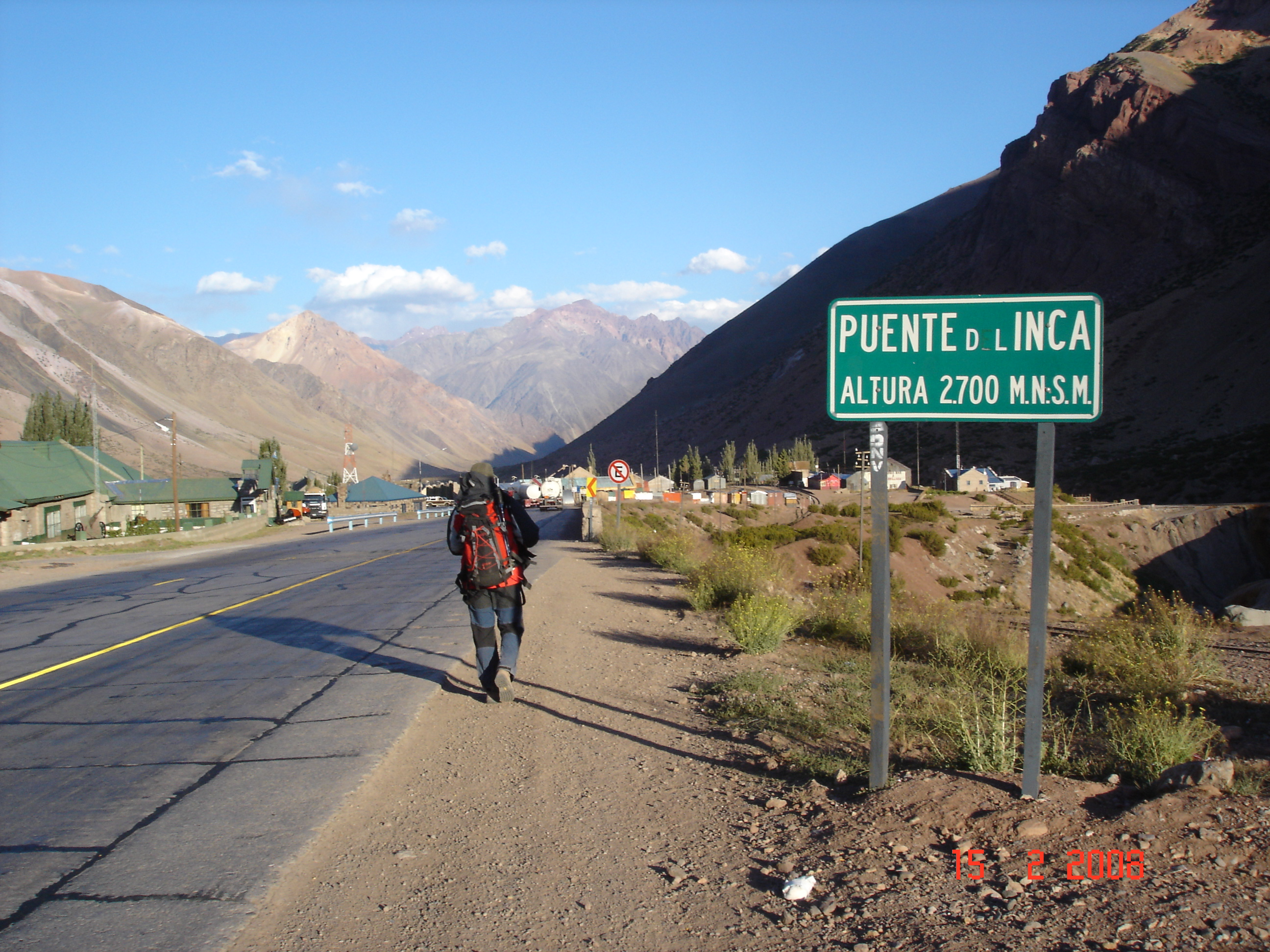
Route 7 at Puente del Inca near the border.

=== Mendoza Province ===
- km 899: Tollbooth (La Paz)
- km 901: CNG service station (La Paz)
- km 936: ACA service station (La Paz)
- km 941: YPF service station (La Dormida)
- km 955: CNG service station (Las Catitas)
- km 1019: YPF service station (Fray Luis Beltrán)
- km 1028: YPF service station (Rodeo de La Cruz)
- km 1146: Shell service station (Uspallata)
- km 1146: ACA service station (Uspallata)
- km 1235: Tollbooth (Las Cuevas)

== Road conditions ==
| Name | Distance (km) | Length (m) |
|---|---|---|
| Tunnel n.º 2 | 1122,08 | 60 |
| Tunnel n.º 3 | 1122,37 | 50 |
| Tunnel n.º 4 | 1129,62 | 40 |
| Tunnel n.º 5 | 1129,91 | 50 |
| Tunnel n.º 6 | 1130,02 | 30 |
| Tunnel n.º 7 | 1130,14 | 70 |
| Tunnel n.º 8 | 1130,32 | 150 |
| Tunnel n.º 9 | 1132,31 | 210 |
| Tunnel n.º 10 | 1132,62 | 190 |
| Tunnel n.º 11 | 1178,21 | 20 |
| Tunnel n.º 12 | 1186,30 | 50 |
| Tunnel n.º 13 | 1187,84 | 100 |
| Cobertizo | 1213,70 | 100 |
| Tunnel n.º 14 | 1232,04 | 440 |
| Túnel del Cristo Redentor | 1235,39 | 3080 |

Route 7 is a highway or expressway over the following sections:

- km 12 to 22: Avenida General Paz to Camino de Cintura (a section of Access West), opened 1 September 1998.
- km 22 to 38: Camino de Cintura to Moreno (a section of Access West), opened in 1984.
- km 38 to 60: Moreno to the junction with Provincial Route 6, opened in 1970.
- km 60 to 75: Provincial Route 6 to Luján (a section of Access West).
- km 258 to 261: Junín city crossroads.
- km 654 to 865: The whole of San Luis Province, opened 16 April 2003.
- km 868 to 888: From Desaguadero to the tollbooth, opened 16 December 2011.
- km 906 to 954: From La Paz to Las Catitas, opened to the public on 3 March 2011.
- km 954 to 965: From Las Catitas to Santa Rosa (opened 4 March 2010).
- km 965 to 999: From Santa Rosa to San Martín (opened 5 October 2007).
- km 999 to 1015: From San Martín to Palmira (a section of Access East), opened in 1979.
- km 1015 to 1041: From Palmira to Mendoza (a section of Access East), opened in 1977.
- km 1041 to 1064: From Mendoza to Agrelo (superimposed over National Route 40).

The project of converting the road into a highway will complete with the section from Luján (km 75) to Junín (km 263). Construction is hoped to finish on this section in the next few years.

In various sections between Agrelo and Potrerillos, and between Uspallata and Las Cuevas, only the uphill lane has two carriageways. This makes it easier for motorists to overtake trucks driving up the mountains.

Ice and snow tend to accumulate on the roads during the winter, so tyre chains are given out. At these times the maximum speed is 40 km/h (25 mph). The chains must be removed when the car is driving on asphalt, because this ruins the chains and risks puncturing the tyres. Before setting off on the Andes crossing, road users are advised to check up on the state of the road. The National Gendarmarie run an AM and FM radio station that gives information on road conditions, plays music and reads the day's news headlines.

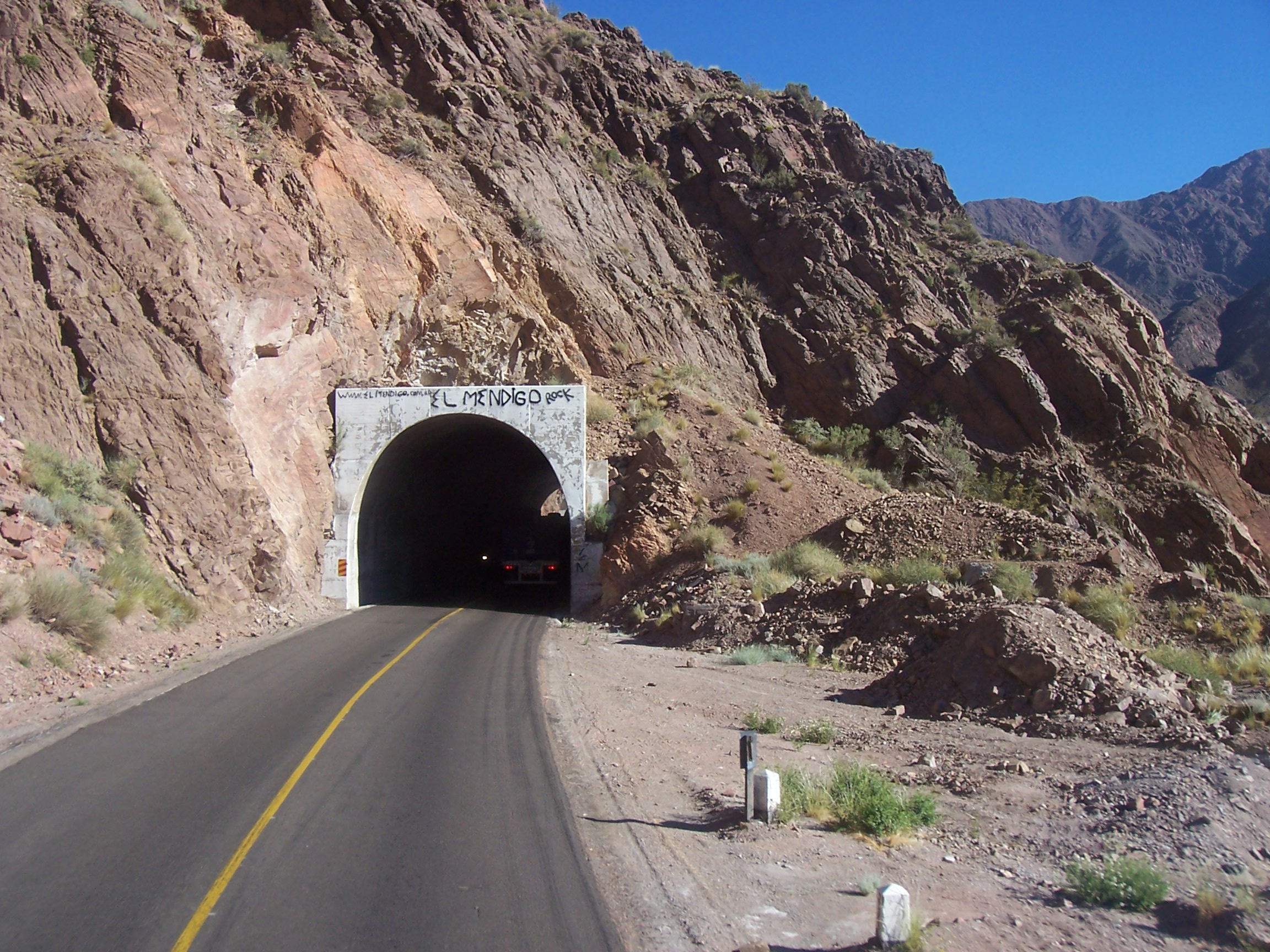
One of the 14 tunnels of National Route 7.

There are 14 tunnels between Luján de Cuyo and Las Cuevas. The maximum speed here is 40 km/h (25 mph) because there are hidden bends coming out of many of these tunnels.

The table on the right shows the tunnels in 2004. Work started on tunnels 2 and 8 on 1 October 2003 and finished on 31 July 2005. Between them they cover 500 m.

Tunnel 1 is on the outskirts of Cacheuta, on Provincial Route 82 (an old stretch of National Route 7) and it is closed. The route now passes outside the mountain next to Mendoza River.

There are dangerous bends with their own names up in the high mountain stretches of road. East of Uspallata you can find Curva de Guido and Curva de los Chilenos, while to the west there are some called Curva de la Mirian, the Curva del Tiempo, the Curva del Yeso and the Curva de la Soberanía Nacional.

== Management ==
In 1990, the country's highest-traffic roads were granted the right to collect tolls, and were divided into Road Corridors for this purpose. The same right was granted to the Buenos Aires Access Network in 1993. Through this scheme, the company New Routes took charge of Road Corridor 5, which included Route 7 km 69-490, from Luján (Buenos Aires) as far as Laboulaye (Córdoba). They installed tollbooths at Villa Espil (km 87) and Junín (km 272).

At the same time, the company Caminos del Oeste took charge of Road Corridor 3, which included Route 7 km 490-999, from Laboulaye as far as San Martín (Mendoza). They installed tollbooths at Vicuña Mackenna (Córdoba) (km 591), La Cumbre (San Luis) (km 762) and La Paz (Mendoza) (km 900).

In 1993 companies were invited to place bids to extend Access West from Avenida General Paz to Luján. Grupo Concesionario del Oeste won the contract in 1994. Work finished on 2 September 1998.

In an agreement between the national government and San Luis Province, the province constructed a 214 km expressway running across the province, and in exchange the government granted all revenue from that road to the province for 30 years. The agreement was signed on 6 October 2000. This agreement meant that Camino del Oeste would not receive the revenue from this road. Work started on 16 April 2003.

The road corridor contracts expired in 2003. This meant that some highways could be renumbered and new tenders were offered. Autovía Oeste put in the winning bid for Road Corridor 3. They said they would extend the corridor with two sections from 63–654 km and from 865–999 km, corresponding to Luján - San Martín excluding San Luis Province. In 2010 they took over the joint venture of building a highway from Buenos Aires to the Andes.

The expressway between San Martín and Mendoza is maintained by a modular system.

The 180 km stretch between National Route 40 and the Chilean border has been managed by recovery and maintenance contracts since 1 January 2007. Prior to that, this section had been maintained directly by the National Highways Directorate.

== Transit ==
=== Speed limits ===
The maximum speed limit for cars and motorcycles is 120 km/h on the expressway sections and 100 km/h on the dual carriageway sections outside urban areas. In the mountain zones the maximum speed is 80 km/h in some sections and 60 km/h in others. The speed limit in tunnels is 40 km/h.

The maximum speed for buses is 90 km/h or the maximum for cars on that section, whichever is lowest. For trucks it is either 80 km/h or the maximum for trucks, whichever is lowest.

=== Transport measurements ===
Annual average daily traffic on National Route 7 in 2001.

In order to prioritise which roads to improve and which road junctions to build, the National Highways Directorate have divided the national road network into 1,200 sections of uniform traffic.

Route 7 is divided into 20 sections in Buenos Aires, 2 in Santa Fe, 5 in Córdoba, 13 in San Luis and 15 in Mendoza.

The annual daily average traffic is calculated for each section. This is done by dividing the total number of vehicles travelling there each year by the number of days in the year (either 365 or 366).

The graph shows the annual average daily traffic for 2001. The graph is not continuous and does not show the urban areas. Neither does it show the section of Route 7 that is contiguous with National Route 40 in the outskirts of Mendoza city.

The section with the highest traffic is the most eastern 10 km of the route, with an annual average daily load of 82,500 vehicles per day in 2001. This value decreases as the distance to Buenos Aires city increases. There were only 6,550 vehicles per day in that year to the west of the former National Route 192, 60 km from the start of the route, where the rural zone begins. The lowest volume of traffic occurs around La Picasa Lake where the route has been cut off by water since the measurements began. Here there are 1,150 purely local vehicles.

Around 3,000 vehicles per day travel through the rural areas of Córdoba, while San Luis has 4,000 vehicles per day due to the Villa Mercedes junction with National Route 8.

From the city of San Martín in Mendoza province, on the edge of the rural zone, to the outskirts of Mendoza city, the traffic ranges between 5,400 and 63,400 vehicles per day.

Finally, the section between the superposition with National Route 40 and the national border, the value is around 1,500 vehicles per day.

== Geography ==
Heights of National Route 7 in Mendoza Province.

The graph on the right shows the height of the road as it runs through Mendoza Province.

On the west of the province, the route runs through the main and front ranges, and passes only 18 km south of Aconcagua, the highest mountain in the Americas. You can see the mountain from a viewpoint at 1222 km.

From the east of Uspallata to the city of Mendoza, the route runs through the foothills.

Until the construction of the Túnel del Cristo Redentor in 1980, the route finished at 3,832 msnm at Paso Internacional de la Cumbre, where it ended at the statue of Christ the Redeemer of the Andes.

Height above sea level between the junction with National Route 40 and Avenida General Paz.

Due to the extreme height, the mountain pass is cut off for several days during the winter months because of snowdrifts on the road. To relieve the situation, they started to pave National Route 145 in the southwest of Mendoza Province, which joins the neighbouring republic to the Pehuenche passage lower down so it doesn't have the same problem.

The graph on the left shows the height of the road between the junction with National Route 40 on the outskirts of Mendoza city and Avenida General Paz.

From the eastern part of Mendoza province, the route runs through the Great Plain of Travesia. The plain slopes down towards the Desaguadero River, which is the provincial border with San Luis. In that province there are some higher sections near the Sierras pampeanas. This part doesn't cause any traffic problems because this part of Route 7 is an autopista.

After running through some frequently flooded areas in Córdoba and Santa Fe provinces (mainly the latter), it runs past several lakes in Santa Fe province and the east of Buenos Aires province. Then it continues through the Ondulada pampas until it reaches the republic's capital.

== Tourism ==
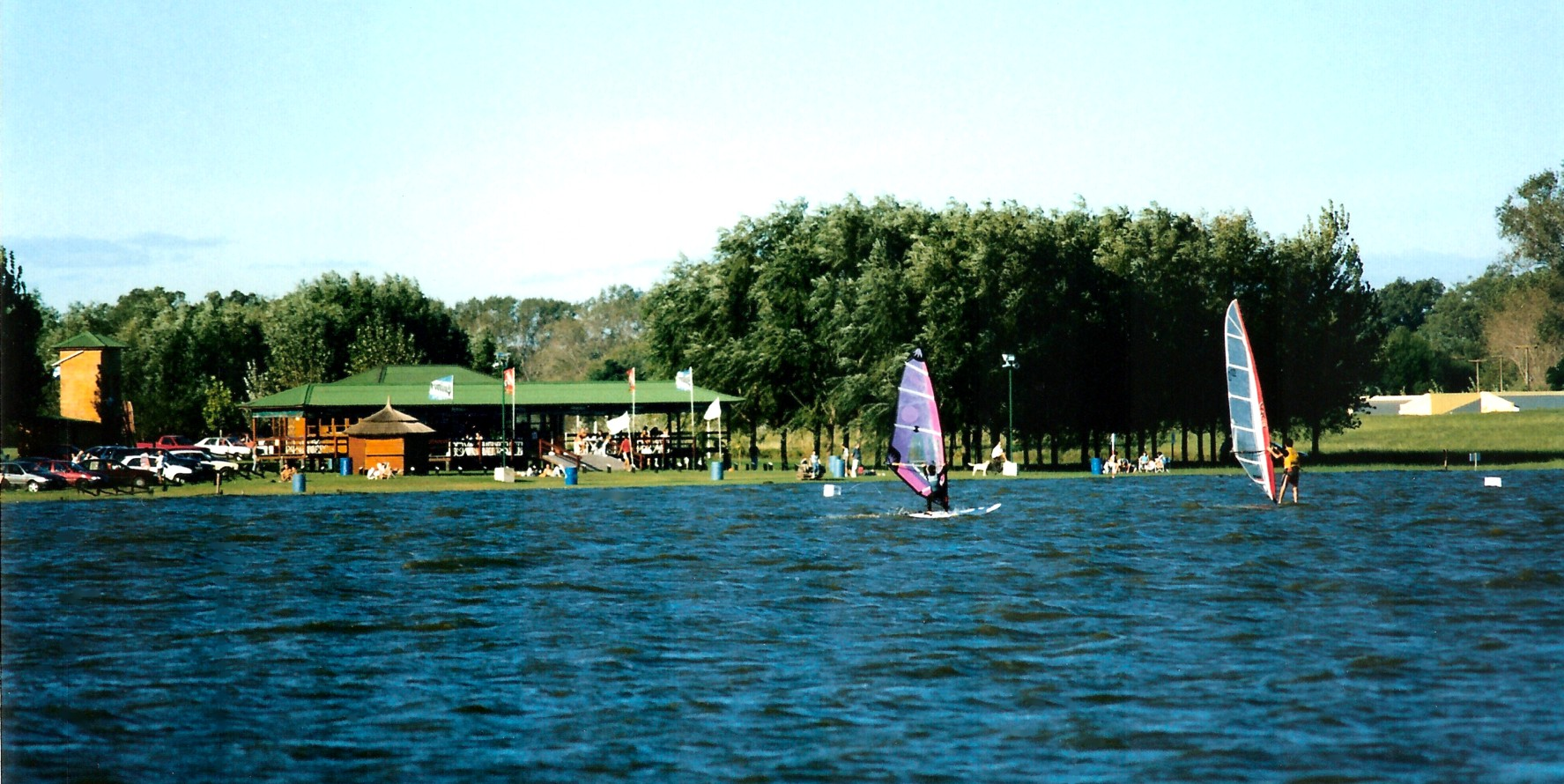
Lake Gómez.

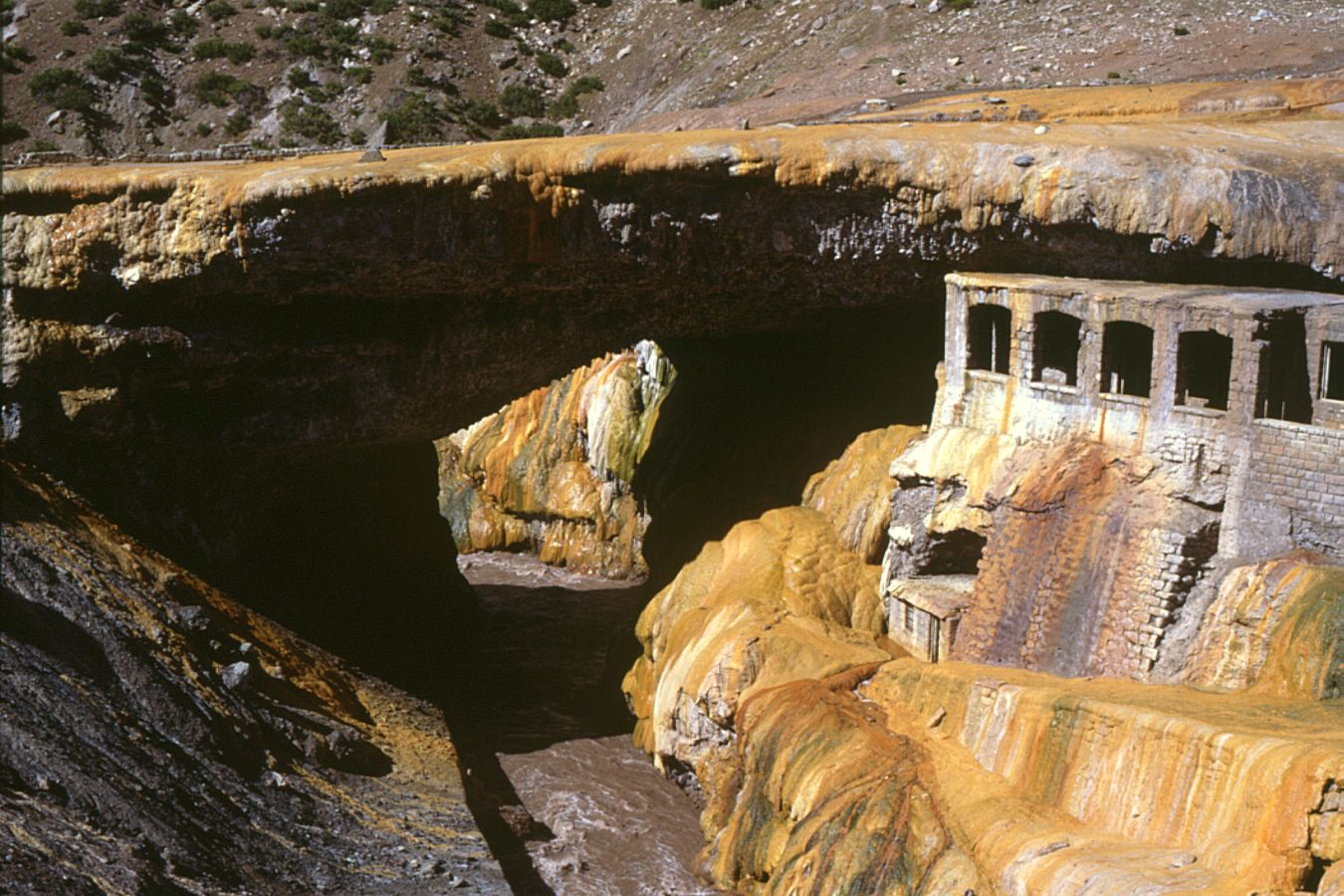
Puente del Inca over Las Cuevas River.

National Route 7 passes through several places of interest to tourists.

In Luján you can visit the Basilica of Our Lady of Luján, built between 1887 and 1935. This is one of the most important in the country. It is the focus of annual pilgrimages along the old section of the road (now Provincial Route 7) from the barrio Liniers. The city also has a municipal spa on the river of the same name, the museum of transport and Enrique Udaondo Museum Complex, along with several other museums.

Junín is the main tourist centre in the lake district of Buenos Aires. The biggest attraction is the Lake Gómez natural park, which is ideal for water sports, relaxation and fishing. The Chiquita Sea, El Carpincho Lake and Lake Gómez all lie within 10 km of the city. Junín is also the home of numerous cultural and sporting events, such as the Pejerrey Provincial Festival, the Fiambre Casero Regional Festival and the Spring Festival.

Rufino holds the National Livestock Festival in the second half of October. The best examples of animals from the region are exhibited there.

Villa Mercedes has the Santiago Betbeder Museum, with an exhibition containing old carriages, a grocery store and a chapel.

In the outskirts of San Luis there is a mountain circuit, with the La Florida and Cruz de Piedra reservoirs and a waterfall at Potrero de los Funes.

You can visit vineyards around Mendoza, with visitor guides and several wineries.

In the city of Mendoza itself, there are various museums, the foundation area (the old city centre before the 1861 Mendoza earthquake) and the General San Martín Park. The park has a lake, a zoo and the estate of the City University. It also contains Cerro de la Gloria which can be accessed by vehicles and has a statue of General San Martín. The whole city can be viewed from the top of this mountain.

There is a ski resort at Los Penitentes in the high mountain zones. There is a natural bridge over Las Cuevas River at Puente del Inca. The bridge was uncrossable in 2006 because of the risk of collapse. There is also the Andinista Cemetery, the entrance to Aconcagua Provincial Park, several viewpoints, and a zigzag road leading to the Chilean border where the Cristo Redentor statue stands.
