= National Route A006 (Argentina) =

Highway in Argentina

Coordinates: 32°48′S 70°01′W

- Ruta nacional A006

Route information
- Length: 8.5 km (5.3 mi)

Location
- Country: Argentina

Highway system
- Highways in Argentina

National Route A006 is a gravel road of 8.5 km (5.3 mi) connecting the town of Las Cuevas on the northwest of the province of Mendoza with the Christ the Redeemer monument in the border between Argentina and Chile. This road is only open in the summer season. Drivers are recommended to check road conditions in advance in Mendoza or Uspallata, as the road is sometimes impassable. In its winding length it changes altitude from 3,151 m (10,338 ft) to 3,832 m (12,572 ft).

Before the construction of the Cristo Redentor Tunnel, the road was the only border crossing between the two countries in this area.

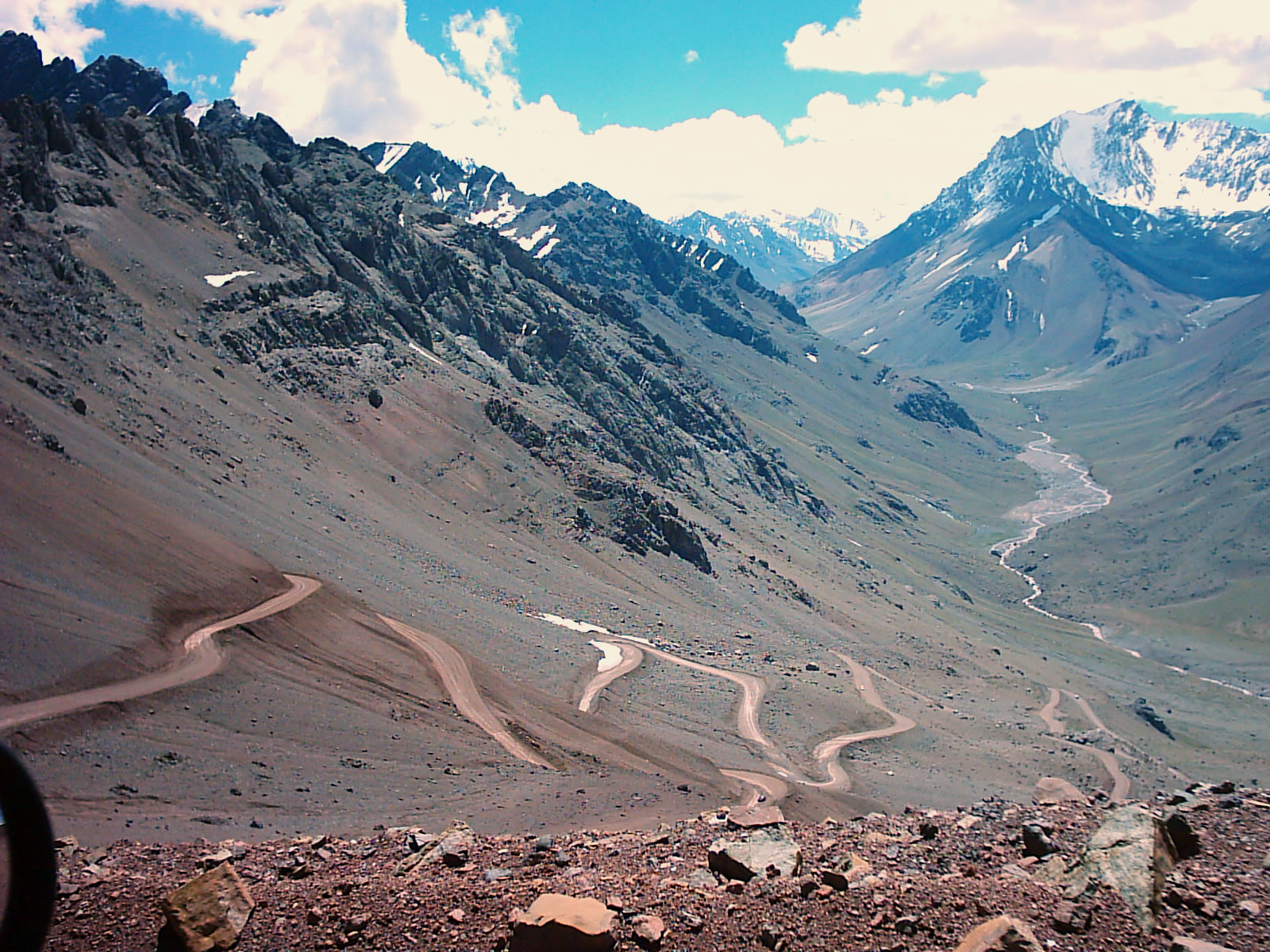
National Route A006, Mendoza. Las Cuevas river on the right.
