= Juan Carlos Corazza =

Argentine theatre director

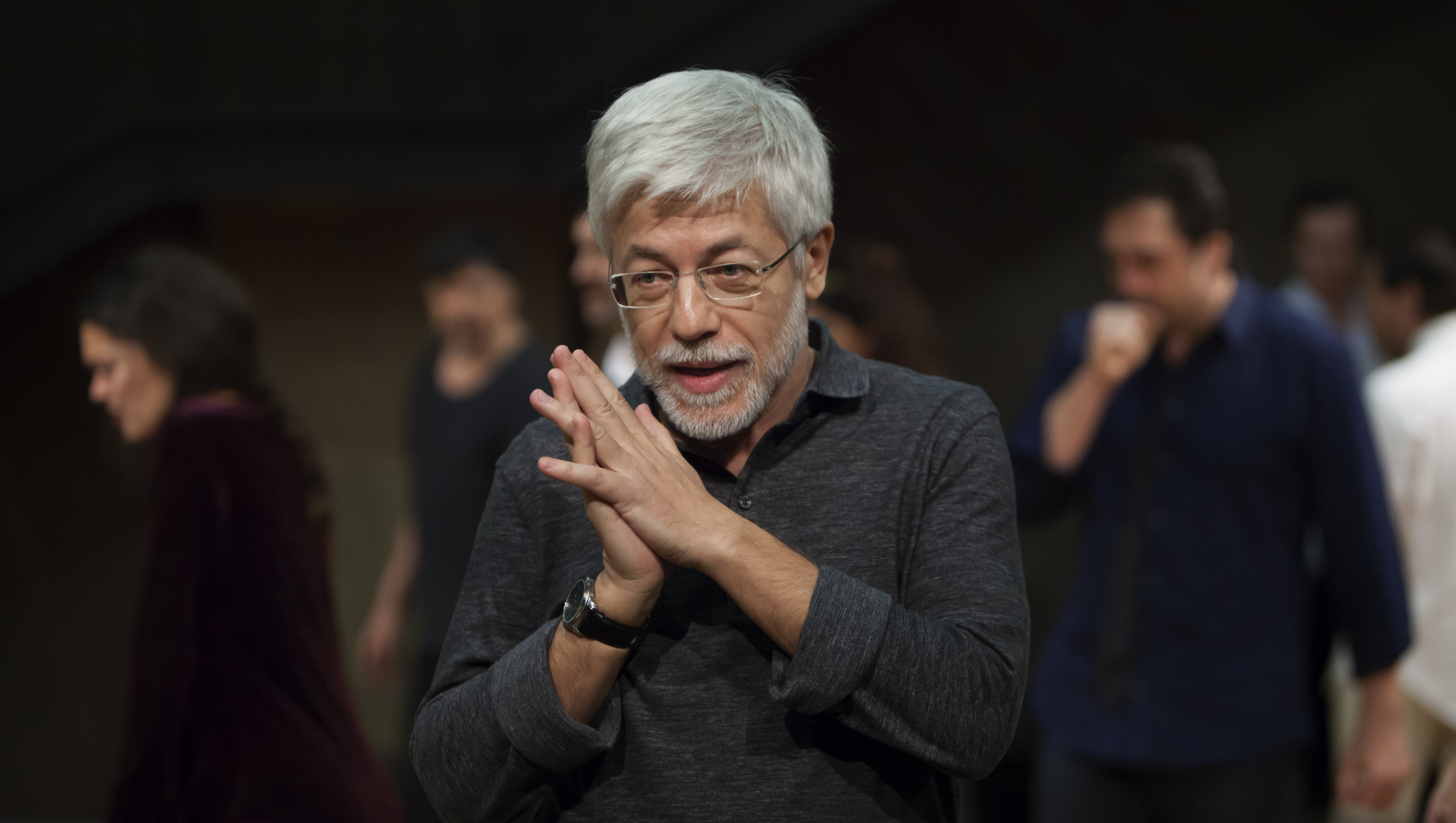
- Born: 1959 (age 65–66); Argentina
- Occupations: Acting teacher; theatre director

Juan Carlos Corazza (born 1959) is an Argentine acting teacher and theatre director who has been based in Spain since the 1990s.

== Biography ==
Born in 1959 in Argentina, he was raised in Adelia María, in the province of Córdoba. He trained at the Buenos Aires' Conservatory of Dramatic Art under Carlos Gandolfo and Augusto Fernandes. After directing his first play in Spain with the Centro Andaluz de Teatro (CAT) in 1990, he founded an acting atelier in Madrid, remaining active in Spain from then on.

Some of his alumni include Javier Bardem, Elena Anaya, Silvia Abascal, Roberto Enríquez, Juana Acosta, Alba Flores, Alicia Borrachero, Sergio Peris-Mencheta, Alberto Ammann, Javier Godino, Manuela Velasco, and Pilar López de Ayala.

He has also trained Consuelo Trujillo and Manuel Morón, who have become acting teachers themselves.

He was bestowed with the Special Award at the 27th Actors and Actresses Union Awards in 2018, by two of his students (Javier Bardem and Elena Anaya).
