= Laboulaye, Argentina =

Laboulaye
- City
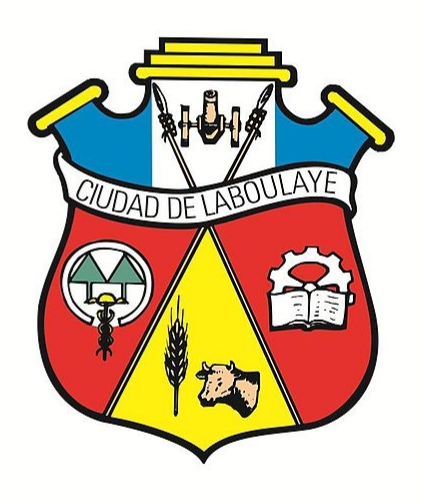
- Coat of arms

- Location of Laboulaye in Argentina
- Coordinates: 34°7′S 63°24′W
- Country: Argentina
- Province: Córdoba
- Department: P. Roque Sáenz Peña

Government
  - Intendant: Gino Chiapello (UCR)
- Elevation: 131 m (430 ft)

Population (2010 census)
  - Total: 20,534
- Time zone: UTC−3 (ART)
- CPA base: X6120
- Dialing code: +54 3385

Laboulaye is a city in the southeast of the province of Córdoba, Argentina. It has 20,534 inhabitants as per the 2010 census [INDEC]. It lies on National Route 7, near the provincial borders of Santa Fe and Buenos Aires, about 315 km south from Córdoba City and 285 km west from Rosario.

== Climate ==
Climate data for Laboulaye, Córdoba (1991–2020, extremes 1950–present)
Month	Jan	Feb	Mar	Apr	May	Jun	Jul	Aug	Sep	Oct	Nov	Dec	Year
Record high °C (°F)	46.3 (115.3)	42.9 (109.2)	40.0 (104.0)	35.7 (96.3)	32.9 (91.2)	29.7 (85.5)	33.0 (91.4)	36.1 (97.0)	35.6 (96.1)	41.7 (107.1)	40.4 (104.7)	45.1 (113.2)	46.3 (115.3)
Mean daily maximum °C (°F)	30.4 (86.7)	29.1 (84.4)	27.3 (81.1)	23.4 (74.1)	19.4 (66.9)	16.3 (61.3)	15.7 (60.3)	18.7 (65.7)	21.3 (70.3)	23.8 (74.8)	27.3 (81.1)	29.9 (85.8)	23.6 (74.5)
Daily mean °C (°F)	23.2 (73.8)	21.8 (71.2)	19.9 (67.8)	16.1 (61.0)	12.4 (54.3)	9.1 (48.4)	8.1 (46.6)	10.2 (50.4)	13.2 (55.8)	16.6 (61.9)	20.0 (68.0)	22.4 (72.3)	16.1 (61.0)
Mean daily minimum °C (°F)	16.9 (62.4)	15.9 (60.6)	14.2 (57.6)	10.8 (51.4)	7.6 (45.7)	4.0 (39.2)	2.8 (37.0)	3.9 (39.0)	6.6 (43.9)	10.5 (50.9)	13.5 (56.3)	15.8 (60.4)	10.2 (50.4)
Record low °C (°F)	5.6 (42.1)	2.7 (36.9)	−1.1 (30.0)	−2.9 (26.8)	−7.2 (19.0)	−8.6 (16.5)	−10.8 (12.6)	−8.6 (16.5)	−6.7 (19.9)	−4.0 (24.8)	1.6 (34.9)	1.6 (34.9)	−10.8 (12.6)
Average precipitation mm (inches)	130.0 (5.12)	108.4 (4.27)	128.6 (5.06)	88.7 (3.49)	39.0 (1.54)	13.2 (0.52)	13.5 (0.53)	17.5 (0.69)	48.4 (1.91)	102.3 (4.03)	106.0 (4.17)	137.4 (5.41)	933.0 (36.73)
Average precipitation days (≥ 0.1 mm)	9.3	7.7	8.5	8.2	5.3	3.9	3.6	3.4	5.6	9.6	9.8	10.1	84.9
Average snowy days	0.0	0.0	0.0	0.0	0.0	0.0	0.1	0.1	0.0	0.0	0.0	0.0	0.1
Average relative humidity (%)	69.9	74.3	76.3	76.2	78.4	76.9	72.9	67.1	64.8	68.1	64.5	64.5	71.2
Mean monthly sunshine hours	294.5	248.6	238.7	189.0	164.3	147.0	164.3	195.3	210.0	229.4	273.0	288.3	2,642.4
Mean daily sunshine hours	9.5	8.8	7.7	6.3	5.3	4.9	5.3	6.3	7.0	7.4	9.1	9.3	7.2
Percentage possible sunshine	67	70	63	61	53	49	49	60	60	60	66	62	60
Source 1: Servicio Meteorológico Nacional
Source 2: NOAA (percent sun 1961–1990 and December record low only), Meteo Climat (record highs and lows), Oficina de Riesgo Agropecuario (September record high and February record low only)
