= Uspallata Airport =

Airport in Argentina

Uspallata Airport Aeropuerto de Uspallata
- IATA: none; ICAO: SAMU

Summary
- Airport type: Public
- Serves: Uspallata, Argentina
- Elevation AMSL: 6,525 ft / 1,989 m
- Coordinates: 32°32′20″S 69°20′45″W

Map
- Location of Uspallata Airport in Argentina

Runways
Direction	Length		Surface
Direction	m	ft	Surface
17/35	2,020	6,627	Dirt
- Source: Landings.com Google Maps GCM

Uspallata Airport (Spanish: Aeropuerto de Uspallata, (ICAO: SAMU)) is a public use airport located 5 kilometres (3 mi) north of Uspallata, a small town in the Mendoza Province of Argentina.

There is rising terrain to the north, and mountainous terrain in all other quadrants. The Mendoza VOR-DME (Ident: DOZ) is located 33.1 nautical miles (61 km) south-southeast of the airport.

== See also ==
- Transport in Argentina
- List of airports in Argentina
