= Achiras =

- Locality
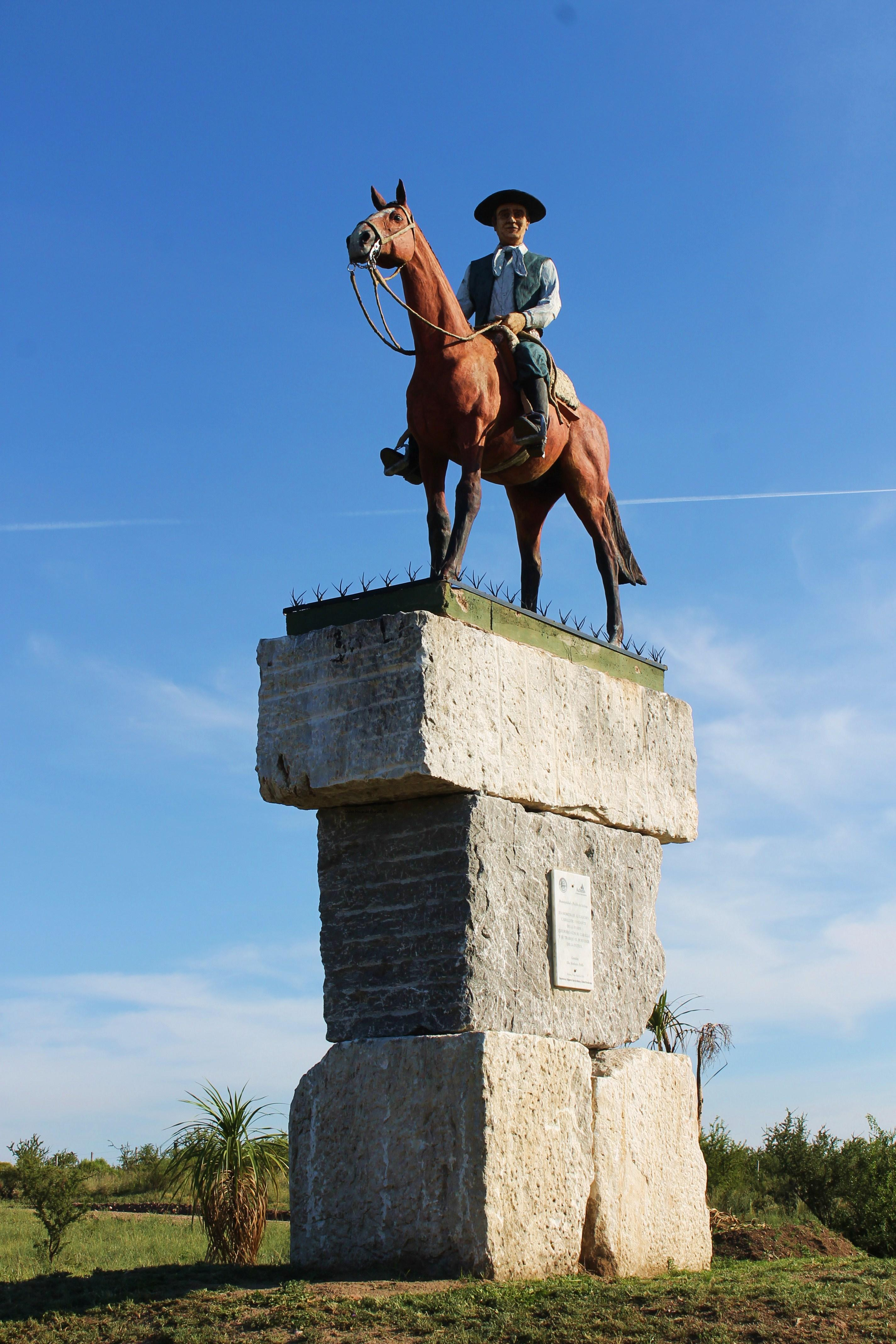

- Location of Achiras in Argentina
- Coordinates: 33°10′31.37″S 64°59′35.92″W
- Country: Argentina
- Province: Córdoba
- Department: Río Cuarto

Government
  - Intendant: Mauricio René García
- Elevation: 832 m (2,730 ft)

Population (2010)
  - Total: 2,287
- Time zone: UTC−3 (ART)

Achiras is a locality located in the Río Cuarto Department in the Province of Córdoba in central Argentina.
