= Christ the Redeemer of the Andes =

Statue on the border between Argentina and Chile

Coordinates: 32°49′30.6″S 70°4′14.8″W

- Cristo Redentor de los Andes
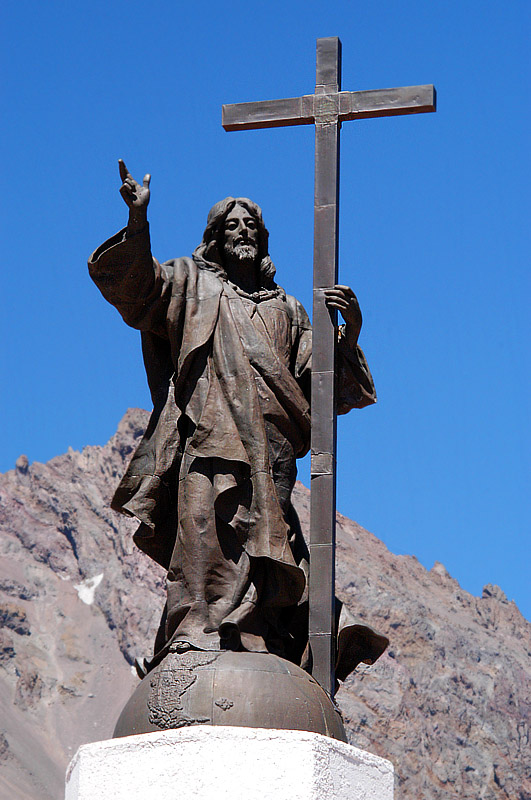
- Christ the Redeemer of the Andes, photographed in 2005.
- Interactive map of Christ the Redeemer of the Andes
- Location: Uspallata Pass, on the frontier between Argentina and Chile
- Designer: Mateo Alonso
- Material: bronze

Christ the Redeemer of the Andes (Spanish: Cristo Redentor de los Andes) is a monument high in the Principal Cordillera of the Andes at 3,832 metres (12,572 ft) above mean sea level on the border between Argentina and Chile. It was unveiled on 13 March 1904 to celebrate the peaceful resolution of the border dispute between the two countries.

The Christ of the Andes, a symbol of eternal peace, is commonly believed to have been made from war cannons, though some historians regard this as doubtful. Engraved at the feet in Spanish are the words, "Sooner shall these mountains crumble into dust than Chileans and Argentines break the peace which at the feet of Christ, the Redeemer, they have sworn to maintain."

The statue is located at the pass of La Cumbre, the highest point on the old road between Mendoza in Argentina and Santiago de Chile. The pass is also known as the Church (Iglesia) Pass on the Chilean side and the Bermejo Pass on the Argentine. The nearest major settlements are the Argentine towns of Uspallata and Juncal in Chile. The closest village is Las Cuevas. The road climbs 1 km over 9 km from Las Cuevas to the pass. The road is only accessible in the summer months when there is no snow. Winter temperatures can reach -30 °C. The road is now principally used as a tourist route to visit the statue, with the main route between the two countries now using the Cristo Redentor Tunnel at the foot of the climb.

== Construction ==
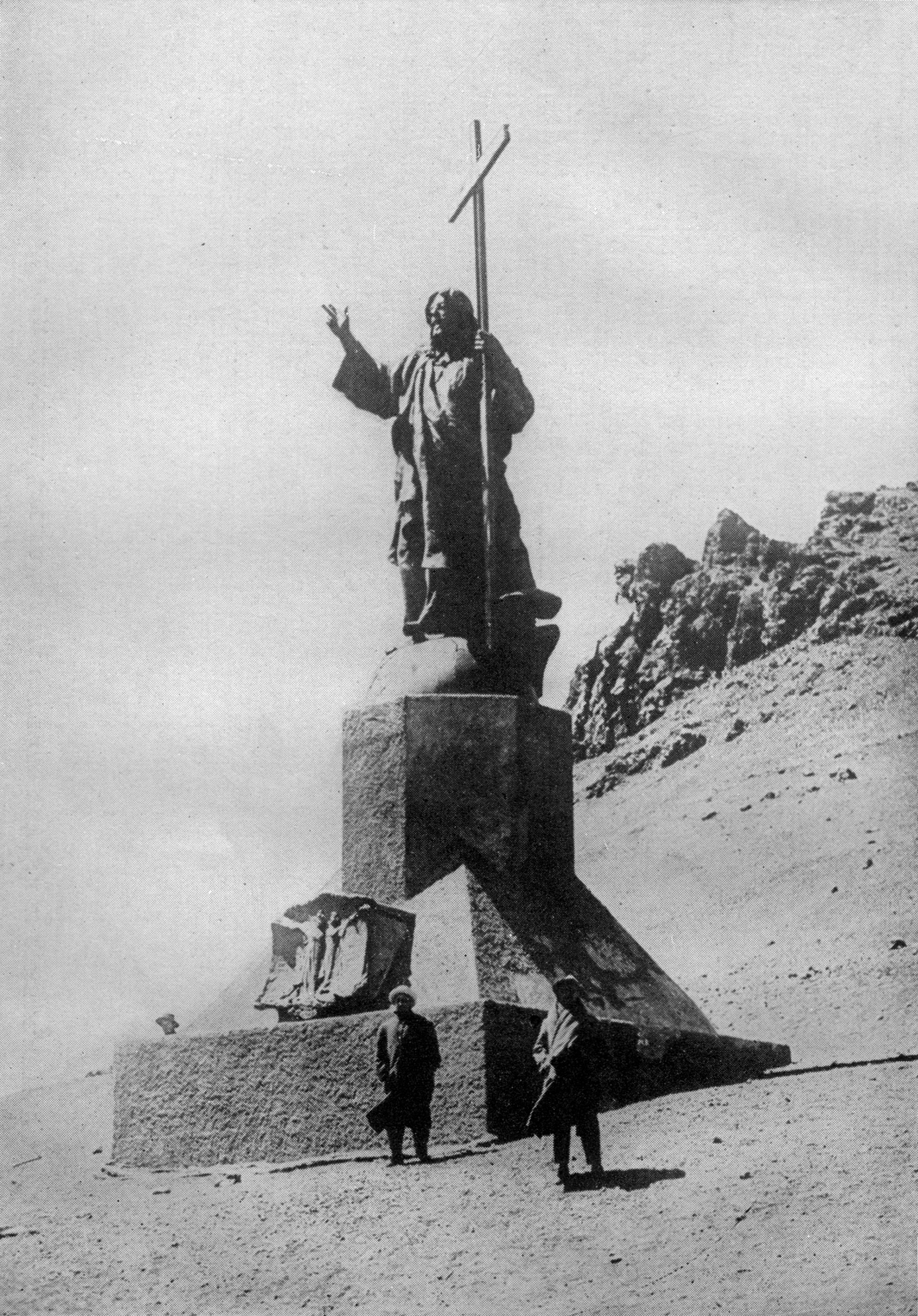
Early photo of the statue

At the beginning of the 20th century, Pope Leo XIII wrote a series of papal encyclicals calling for peace, harmony, and devotion to Christ the Redeemer. At the same time, Argentina and Chile were coming close to armed conflict in an ongoing dispute over the location of the border. The bishop of Cuyo, Argentina, monsignor Marcelino del Carmen Benavente, promised to erect a statue of Christ the Redeemer to remind the parties of Christ's message of peace. The seven-meter-high bronze statue was subsequently made by Buenos Aires sculptor Mateo Alonso and shown for a while in the Lacordaire School of the Dominican Order patio in Buenos Aires.

As the countries slipped closer to war, Ángela Oliveira Cézar de Costa, a well-connected society lady who led a Christian group at the school, had the idea of taking the statue to the Andes in the event of peace as a symbol of unity between the two nations. She had particular cause for concern as her brother was an Argentine Army general preparing for conflict at the frontier. As a friend of the President of Argentina, Julio Roca, she gained the interest of both countries. She would later be nominated for the Nobel Peace Prize.

Diplomatic breakthroughs in May 1902 led Argentina and Chile to a peaceful agreement. The plan for the statue progressed, and Oliveira Cézar de Costa and Bishop Benavente prepared to move the statue to the pass of Cumbre del Bermejo, which José de San Martín had used in 1817 to cross the Andes and liberate Chile from Spanish colonial rule.

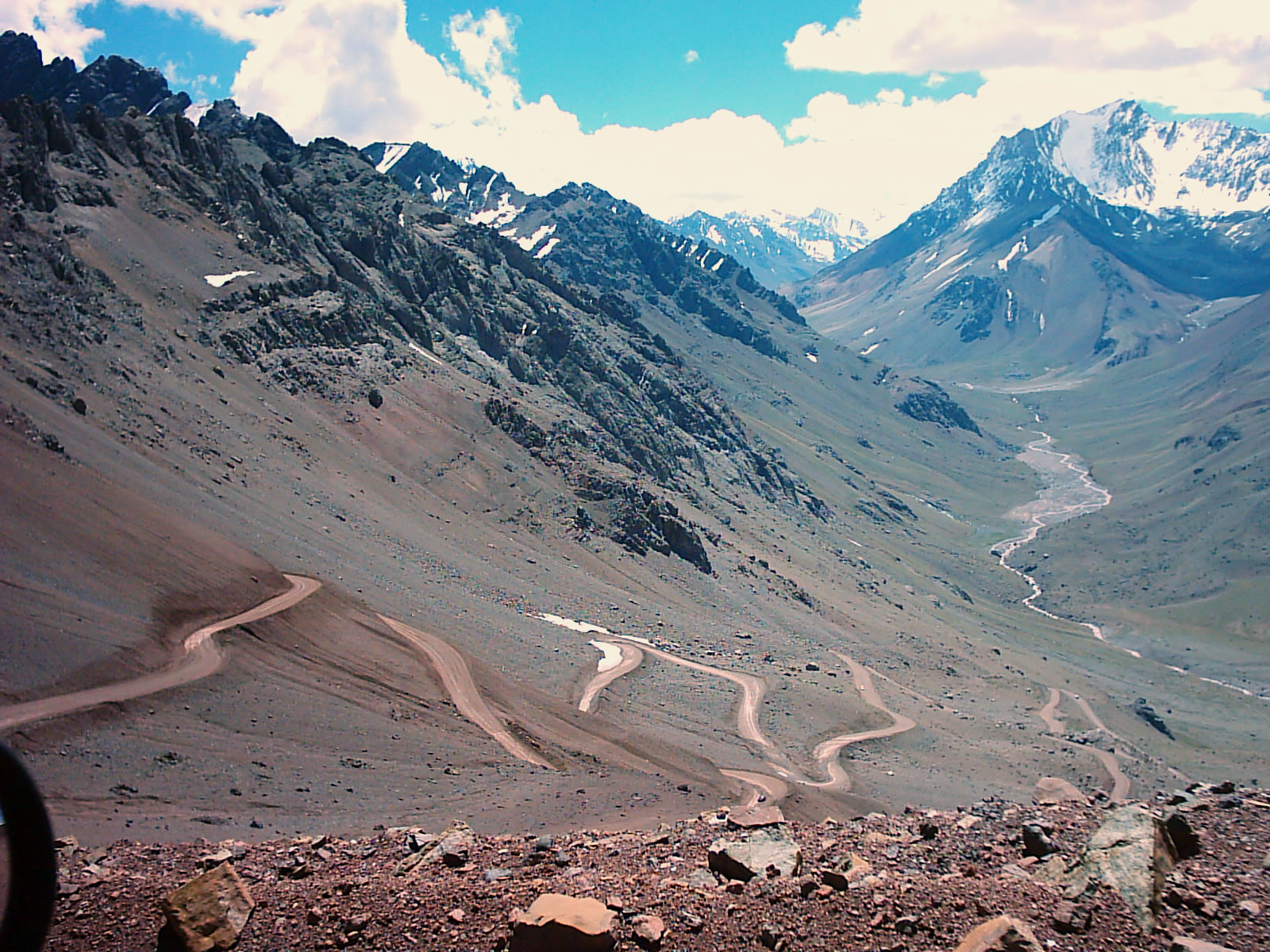
The approach to Cristo Redentor from the Argentine direction

In 1904, the Christ was moved in pieces 1,200 kilometers by train, then carried up the mountains by mule. The six-meter-high granite pedestal designed by Molina Civit was completed on 15 February 1904, and Alonso, the original sculptor, directed the piecing of the bronze statue. It was erected with the figure facing the border line, standing on a globe with South America prominent, his left hand holding a cross and his right raised in blessing.

== Inauguration ==
On 13 March 1904, 3,000 Chileans and Argentines climbed to the summit despite the inhospitable conditions. They watched the two armies, only a short time before ready to do battle with one another, firing gun salutes together. President Roca of Argentina and President Germán Riesco of Chile could not attend. Still, their foreign ministers were present, along with the Archbishop of Buenos Aires and the bishops of Cuyo, Argentina and Ancud, Chile. Two plaques were unveiled celebrating the friendship between the two countries. One is inscribed (in Spanish) "Sooner shall these mountain crags crumble to dust than Chile and Argentina shall break this peace which at the feet of Christ the Redeemer they have sworn to maintain."

== Subsequent development ==
In 1916 the cross of the statue was remade, the original having succumbed to the difficult climate conditions. The original cross of bronze was made into commemorative medals. Various further plaques were added over the years. A major repair was undertaken by the Argentine Province of Mendoza in 1993 when the statue was in great disrepair, as well as nearby buildings that had been used as a meteorological station.

In 2004, the centenary of the statue was celebrated in a ceremony at the statue attended by President Néstor Kirchner of Argentina and President Ricardo Lagos of Chile. They reaffirmed the friendship between the two countries. The statue was declared a National Historic Monument of Argentina.

== Climate ==
Cristo Redentor has a dry-summer tundra climate (Köppen ETs) with virtually rainless summers and cold, snowy winters.

Climate data for Cristo Redentor (1941–1960)
| Month | Jan | Feb | Mar | Apr | May | Jun | Jul | Aug | Sep | Oct | Nov | Dec | Year |
|---|---|---|---|---|---|---|---|---|---|---|---|---|---|
| Record high °C (°F) | 20.0 (68.0) | 17.5 (63.5) | 14.9 (58.8) | 13.8 (56.8) | 10.9 (51.6) | 8.6 (47.5) | 6.8 (44.2) | 9.5 (49.1) | 10.0 (50.0) | 10.5 (50.9) | 13.1 (55.6) | 15.3 (59.5) | 20.0 (68.0) |
| Mean daily maximum °C (°F) | 10.0 (50.0) | 9.8 (49.6) | 7.2 (45.0) | 3.4 (38.1) | −0.5 (31.1) | −3.1 (26.4) | −3.5 (25.7) | −2.9 (26.8) | −1.0 (30.2) | 0.7 (33.3) | 4.5 (40.1) | 8.3 (46.9) | 2.7 (36.9) |
| Daily mean °C (°F) | 4.0 (39.2) | 3.7 (38.7) | 1.9 (35.4) | −0.6 (30.9) | −3.9 (25.0) | −6.4 (20.5) | −7.1 (19.2) | −6.7 (19.9) | −5.0 (23.0) | −3.3 (26.1) | −0.4 (31.3) | 2.8 (37.0) | −1.8 (28.8) |
| Mean daily minimum °C (°F) | −0.3 (31.5) | −0.5 (31.1) | −2.1 (28.2) | −4.1 (24.6) | −7.0 (19.4) | −9.8 (14.4) | −11.0 (12.2) | −10.4 (13.3) | −8.9 (16.0) | −6.9 (19.6) | −3.9 (25.0) | −1.9 (28.6) | −5.5 (22.1) |
| Record low °C (°F) | −8.0 (17.6) | −10.1 (13.8) | −15.5 (4.1) | −14.1 (6.6) | −19.0 (−2.2) | −21.3 (−6.3) | −27.8 (−18.0) | −22.3 (−8.1) | −21.0 (−5.8) | −18.0 (−0.4) | −15.2 (4.6) | −12.7 (9.1) | −27.8 (−18.0) |
| Average precipitation mm (inches) | 2 (0.1) | 2 (0.1) | 8 (0.3) | 9 (0.4) | 35 (1.4) | 62 (2.4) | 91 (3.6) | 47 (1.9) | 60 (2.4) | 43 (1.7) | 15 (0.6) | 7 (0.3) | 381 (15.0) |
| Average snowy days | 3 | 2 | 3 | 4 | 7 | 10 | 9 | 7 | 7 | 8 | 5 | 5 | 70 |
| Average relative humidity (%) | 57.0 | 54.5 | 54.0 | 56.5 | 57.5 | 59.0 | 55.5 | 57.0 | 58.0 | 64.5 | 59.0 | 56.0 | 57.4 |
Source: Secretaria de Mineria, LEV (precipitation data), and UNLP (snowfall data)

== See also ==
- List of statues of Jesus
- Paso Libertadores
