= Río Cuarto Department =

Department of Córdoba Province, Argentina

Río Cuarto Department Departamento Río Cuarto
- Department
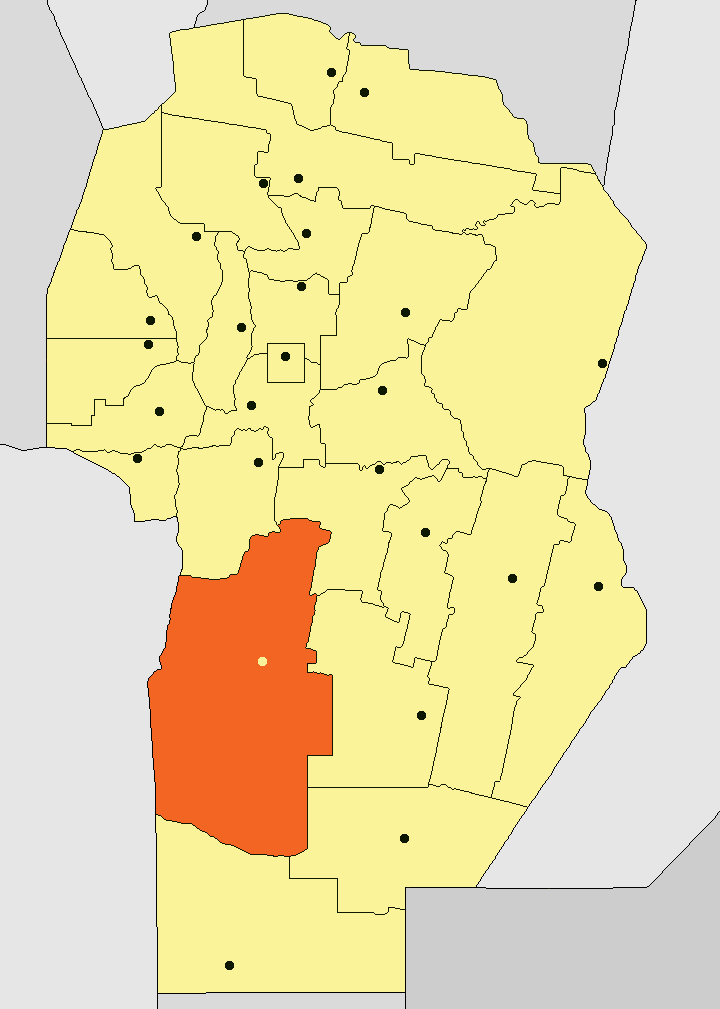
- Location of Río Cuarto Department in Córdoba Province
- Coordinates: 33°08′S 64°20′W
- Country: Argentina
- Province: Córdoba
- Foundation: 23 July 1888
- Founder: provincial law
- Capital: Río Cuarto

Area
  - Total: 18,394 km^{2} (7,102 sq mi)

Population (2022 census [INDEC])
  - Total: 292,293
  - Density: 15.891/km^{2} (41.157/sq mi)
  - Pop. change (2010–2022): +18.16%
- Time zone: UTC-3 (ART)
- Postal code: X5800
- Dialing code: 0358
- Distances to
- Buenos Aires: 608 km (378 mi)
- Córdoba: 235 km (146 mi)

Río Cuarto Department is a department of Córdoba Province in Argentina. Its capital city is Río Cuarto, which is located around 608 km from Capital Federal.

== Settlements ==
- Achiras
- Adelia María
- Alcira Gigena
- Alpa Corral
- Berrotarán
- Bulnes
- Chaján
- Chucul
- Coronal Baigorria
- Coronel Moldes
- Elena
- La Carolina
- La Cautiva
- Las Acequias
- Las Albahacas
- Las Higueras
- Las Peñas Sud
- Las Vertientes
- Malena
- Monte de Los Gauchos
- Río Cuarto
- Sampacho
- San Basilio
- Santa Catalina
- Suco
- Tosquita
- Vicuña Mackenna
- Villa El Chacay
- Washington
