= Vicuña Mackenna, Argentina =

Vicuña Mackenna
- Town
- Location of Vicuña Mackenna in Argentina
- Coordinates: 33°54′56″S 64°23′23″W
- Country: Argentina
- Province: Córdoba
- Department: Río Cuarto

Government
  - Intendant: Roberto Casari (UCR)
- Elevation: 195 m (640 ft)
- Demonym: mackenense
- Time zone: UTC−3 (ART)
- CPA base: X6140
- Dialing code: +54 03583
- Website: https://www.mvm.gob.ar/

Vicuña Mackenna is a town located within the Río Cuarto Department, Córdoba Province, Argentina.

== Location ==
Vicuña Mackenna geographically belongs to the Pampas plains with topographical features of the pampas. The town is located south of the province of Cordoba, in the Department of Río Cuarto some 300 km. of the city of Córdoba, the provincial capital, in a crossing of the National Roads No. 7 and 35.

== Economy ==
It is one of the most dynamic economies in the area, among the main activities include agriculture, whose main crops are soybean, peanut and corn. It also highlights the dairy production and rural tourism. There are several industrial establishments in town that are dedicated especially to the processing of agricultural products and livestock.

== History ==
In 1885 a main railway started to pass for Vicuña Mackenna joining Buenos Aires and Mendoza. The fields where now stay Vicuña Mackenna was provincial fiscals and were known as "Bebe Vino". These was bought in 1874 by Nicolás Avellaneda to Córdoba Province.

After Avellaneda's death and his wife, his fields were donated to two of his sons, who sold to Clodomiro Torres. In May 1904, Clodomiro Torres requested to Provincial Government will benefit him according to Provincial law to establish an Agricultural Village in these fields. On 6 June the province governor Vicente Olmos ordered the creation of "Pueblo Torres".

Since 1885 the station railway was named Vicuña Mackenna, name acquired for a Domingo Faustino Sarmiento’s request in honor to Benjamín Vicuña Mackenna, a Chilean writer and historian, Sarmiento's friend.

In May 1911, the Córdoba governor Félix Tomás Garzón, solved for decree that Pueblo Torres got the name of station railway Vicuña Mackenna. After that date the name of Pueblo Torres disappeared of all state documents.

In 2023 large investments to its sewer network were made.

Its local Day is 19 March.
