= Uspallata Pass =

Chilean-Argentinian Andean mountain pass

Coordinates: 32°48′S 70°01′W

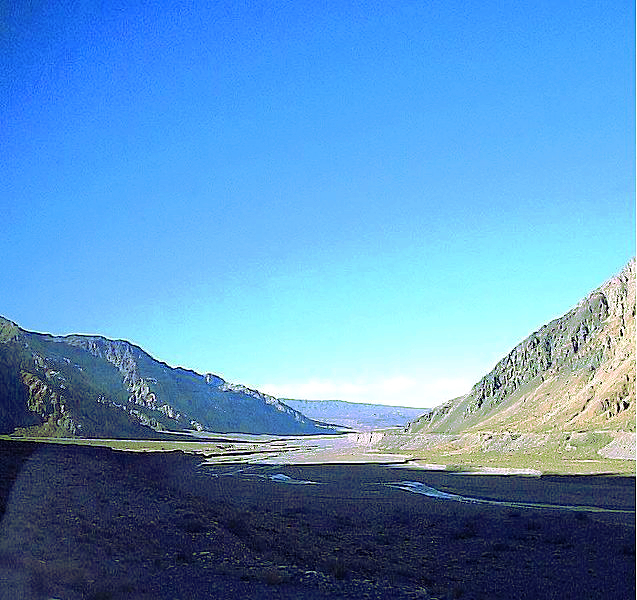
Uspallata Pass

The Uspallata Pass, Bermejo Pass or Cumbre Pass, is an Andean pass which provides a route between the wine-growing region around the Argentine city of Mendoza, the Chilean city Los Andes and Santiago, the Chilean capital situated in the central Chilean valley.

== Overview ==
The pass has been used since colonial times as the most direct link between the Pacific seaport of Valparaíso and the Atlantic port of Buenos Aires, avoiding the 11-day, 5,630 km (3,040 nmi) journey by sea, via Cape Horn, between the two ports. In 1817 it was used by the Army of the Andes to cross the Andes, in the campaign to free Chile from the Spanish Empire.

Reaching a maximum elevation of about 3,830 m (12,566 ft), the pass runs between the peaks of the 6,962 m (22,841 ft) Aconcagua to the north and the 6,570 m (21,555 ft) Tupungato to the south.

In the 1990s it was the most used pass in all of South America. A railroad tunnel built by the now defunct Transandine Railway (1910–1982) runs underneath. The Pan-American Highway runs through the nearby Cristo Redentor Tunnel (in Spanish: Paso Internacional Cristo Redentor) and a monument, Christ the Redeemer of the Andes ("Cristo Redentor de los Andes" in Spanish) is located at the pass.

== See also ==
- Paso Internacional Los Libertadores
