= Adelia María =

- Location of Adelia María in Argentina
- Coordinates: 33°38′09″S 64°00′57″W
- Country: Argentina
- Province: Córdoba
- Department: Río Cuarto

Government
  - Intendant: Jorge Marino
- Elevation: 266 m (873 ft)

Population (2010)
  - Total: 7,586
- Time zone: UTC−3 (ART)

Adelia María is a locality located in the Río Cuarto Department in the Province of Córdoba in central Argentina.

The main source of income is agriculture. There are also plants for the collection of cereals, a flour mill and a Rural Extension Agency of the INTA (National Institute of Agricultural Technology).
