= Paso Internacional Los Libertadores =

Mountain pass between Chile and Argentina

Coordinates: 32.82724°S 70.09213°W

Los Libertadores Pass
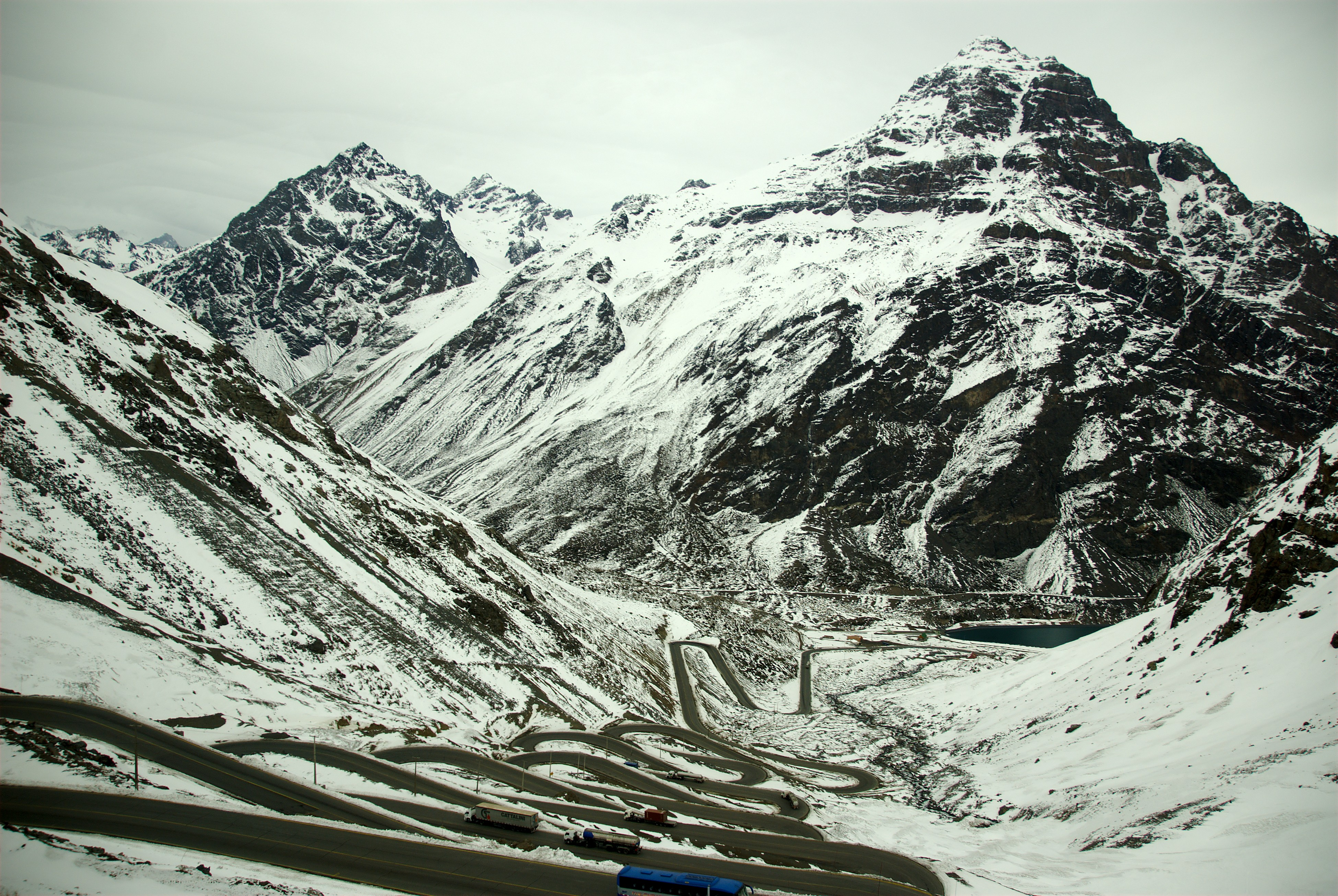
- Switchbacks on the Chilean side of the pass
- Interactive map of Los Libertadores Pass
- Elevation: 3,200 m (10,500 ft)

Location
- Location: Argentina–Chile border
- Range: Principal Cordillera, Andes

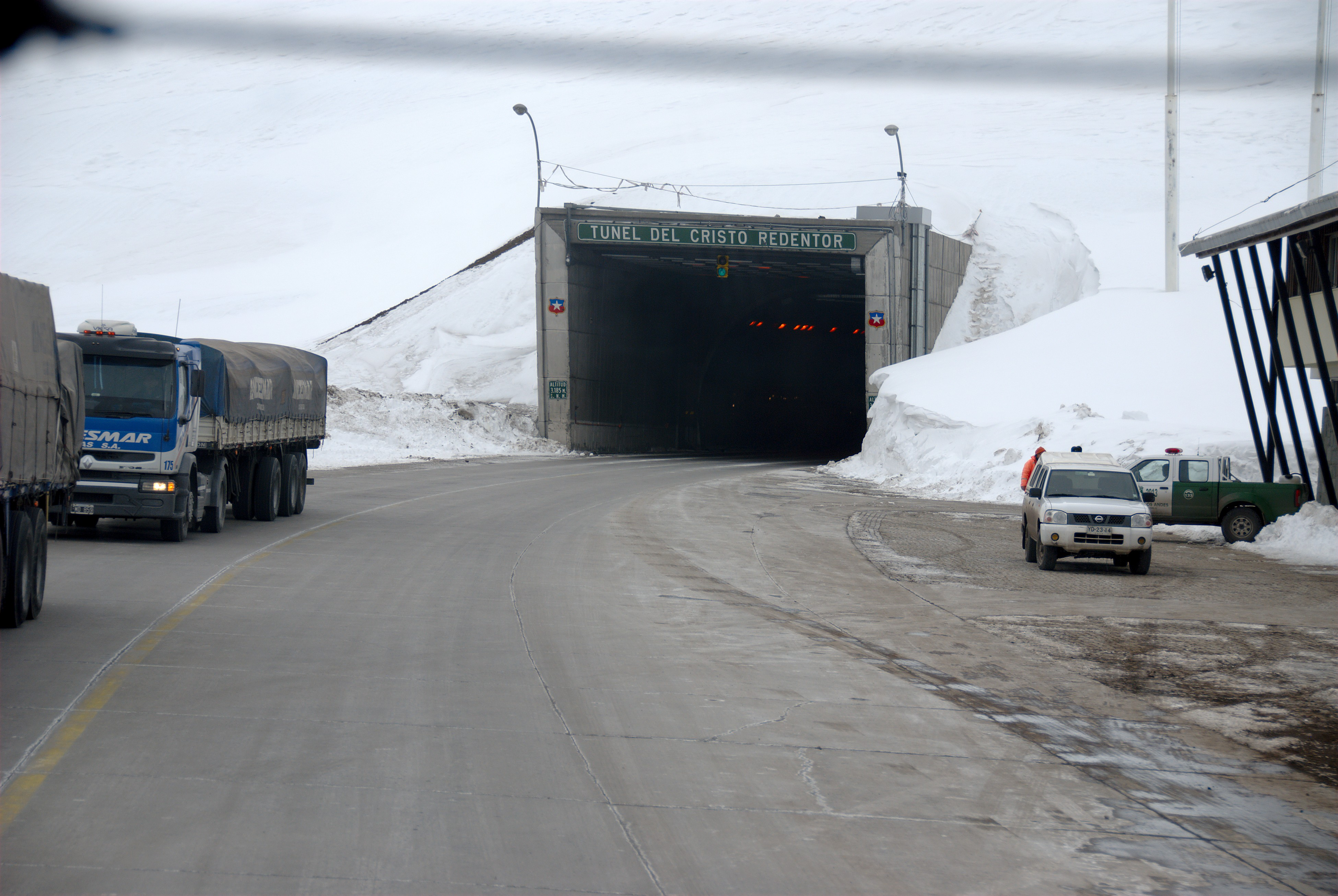
The Chilean tunnel entrance in winter

The Paso Internacional Los Libertadores, also called Cristo Redentor, is a border crossing area in the Andes between Argentina and Chile. It is the main transport route out of the Chilean capital city Santiago into Mendoza Province in Argentina and so carries heavy traffic.

== Overview ==
From the Argentinian side the route to the pass is a slow, gentle incline until entering a tunnel at approximately 3,200 meters (10,500 feet) elevation. On the Chilean side the slope has a far steeper grade, and the road descends down a long series of switchbacks to lower elevations.

Opened in 1980, the Tunnel of Christ the Redeemer (Spanish: Túnel Cristo Redentor) is 3,080 m (10,105 ft) long, and serves as an important land crossing between Chile and Argentina. At the middle of the tunnel is the national border, which is the termini of Chile Route 60 and Argentina Route 7. The path can be closed during winter because of heavy snows blocking both ends and the threat of rockfall.

Its name comes from the four-ton Christ the Redeemer of the Andes (Cristo Redentor de los Andes) statue placed in 1904 near the Uspallata Pass at an elevation of 3,832 m (12,572 ft). The pass was the highest point of the road before the opening of the tunnel lowered the maximum elevation by 600 m (1,969 ft), eliminated 65 switchbacks and shortened the route by 10 km (6 mi).

On 19 September 2013, nearly 15,000 Chileans got stranded on the Argentine side when the pass had to be closed for 10 hours because of freezing temperatures and between 40 and 50 centimeters of snow.

== Alternative proposed tunnels ==
In order to ease the dependence on the only tunnel in the area and to permit year-round crossing, two lower tunnels have been proposed. One of them is the Túnel Juan Pablo II ("John Paul II Tunnel"), which would be constructed at an altitude of between 2,250 and 2,720 m (7,382 and 8,924 ft), 20 km (12 mi) long, to join the towns of Horcones, Argentina and Juncal, Chile.

Another proposed tunnel, named Paso Las Leñas, at an elevation of 2,050 m (6,726 ft) and 13 km (8 mi) of length, would connect El Sosneado in Argentina (near San Rafael) and Machalí, Chile.

The Aconcagua Bi-Oceanic railway is a proposal for a 52-kilometre-long (32 mi) railway base tunnel under this pass.

== See also ==
- Transandine Railway
