= Presidente Roque Sáenz Peña Department =

Presidente Roque Sáenz Peña Department Departamento Presidente Roque Sáenz Peña
- Department
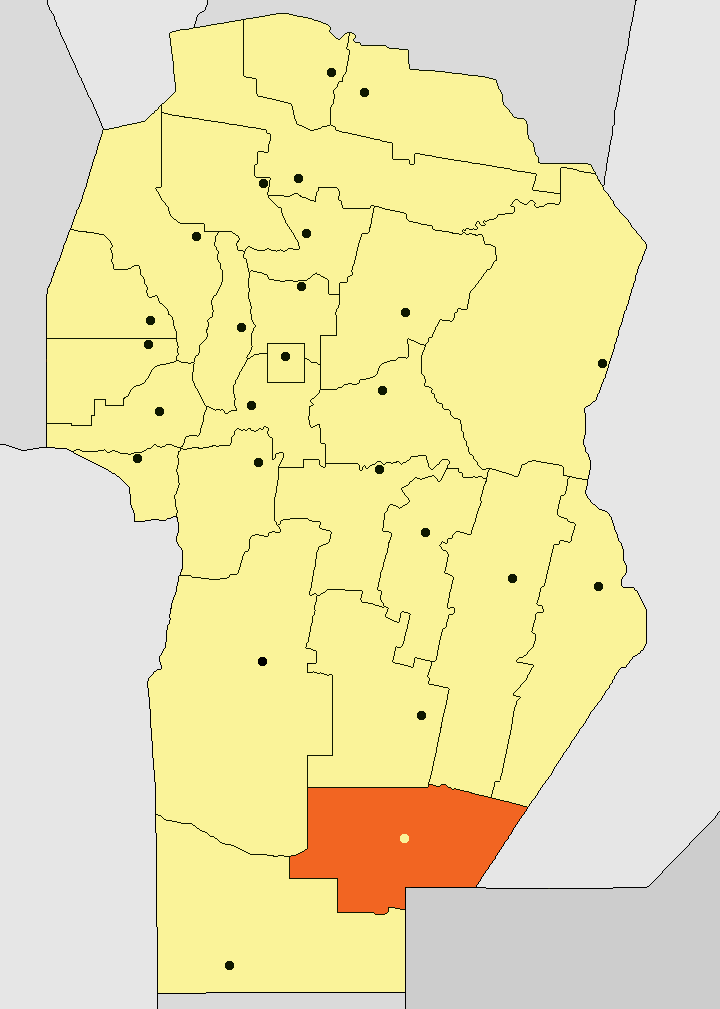
- Location of Presidente Roque Sáenz Peña Department in Córdoba Province
- Coordinates: 34°04′S 63°23′W
- Country: Argentina
- Province: Córdoba
- Capital: Laboulaye

Area
  - Total: 8,228 km^{2} (3,177 sq mi)

Population (2001 census [INDEC])
  - Total: 34,647
  - Density: 4.211/km^{2} (10.91/sq mi)
  - Pop. change (1991-2001): 0.44
- Time zone: UTC-3 (ART)
- Postal code: X6120
- Dialing code: 03385
- Distances to
- Buenos Aires: 520 km (320 mi)
- Córdoba: 346 km (215 mi)

Presidente Roque Sáenz Peña Department is a department of Córdoba Province in Argentina.

The provincial subdivision has a population of about 34,647 inhabitants in an area of 8,228 km^{2}, and its capital city is Laboulaye, which is located around 520 km from Capital Federal.

== Settlements ==
- General Levalle
- La Cesira
- Laboulaye
- Leguizamón
- Melo
- Río Bamba
- Rosales
- San Joaquín
- Serrano
- Villa Rossi
