= Uspallata =

- Village
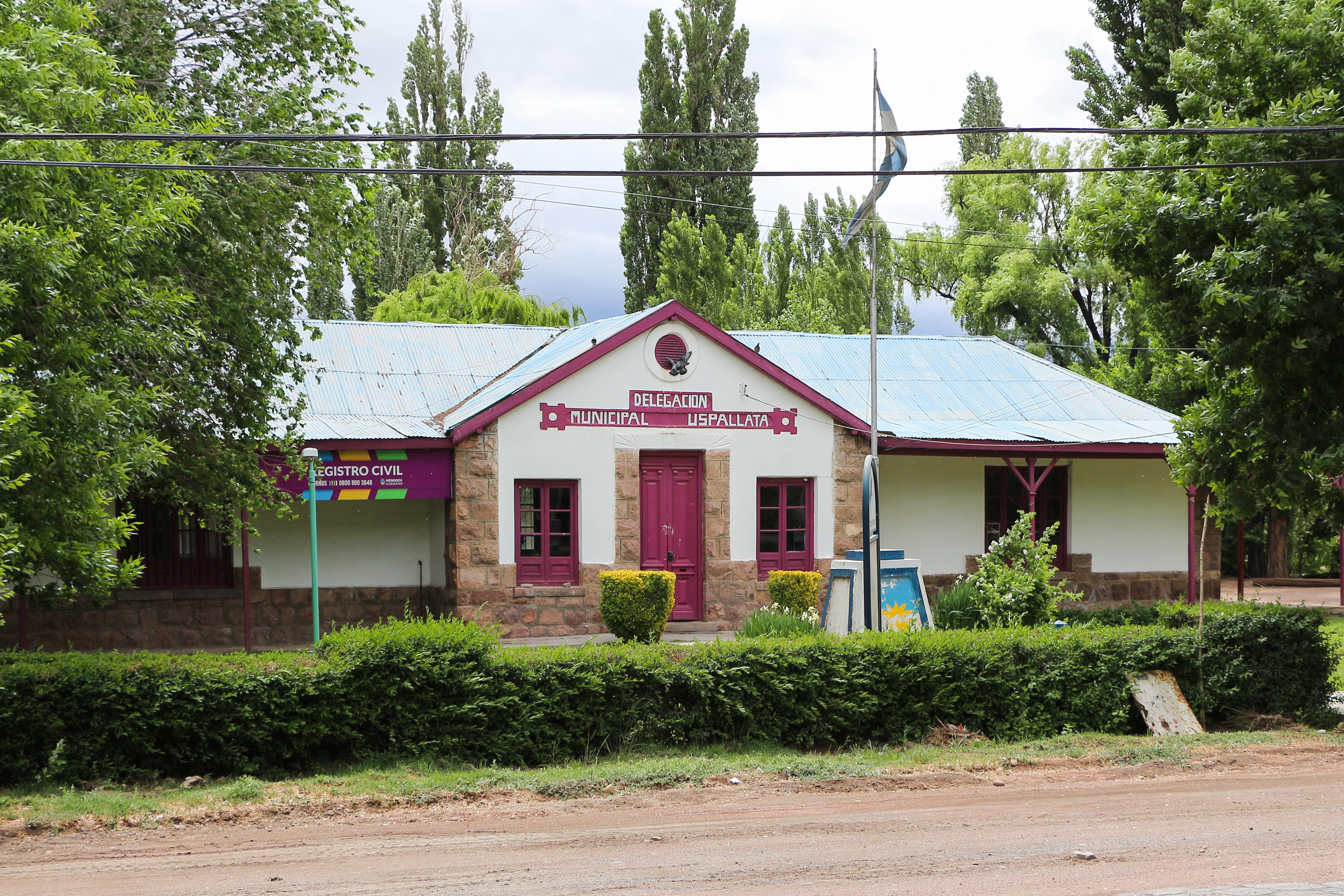
- Municipal House, Uspallata
- Interactive map of Uspallata
- Coordinates: 32°34′S 69°19′W
- Country: Argentina
- Province: Mendoza
- Department: Las Heras
- Elevation: 2,039 m (6,690 ft)

Population
  - Total: 3,439
- Postal code: M5553
- Phone code: +54 261
- Climate: BWk

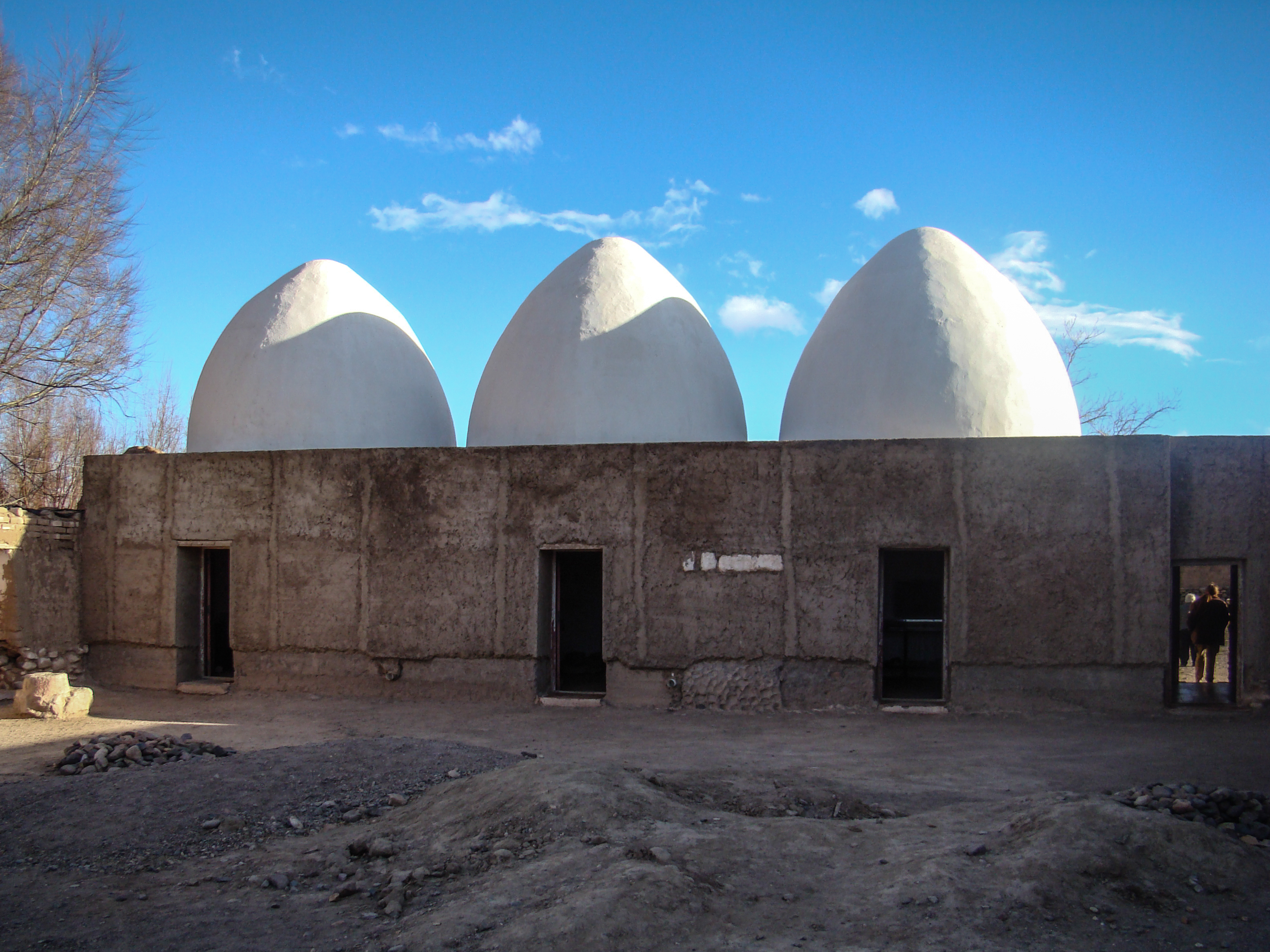
Las Bovedas in Uspallata

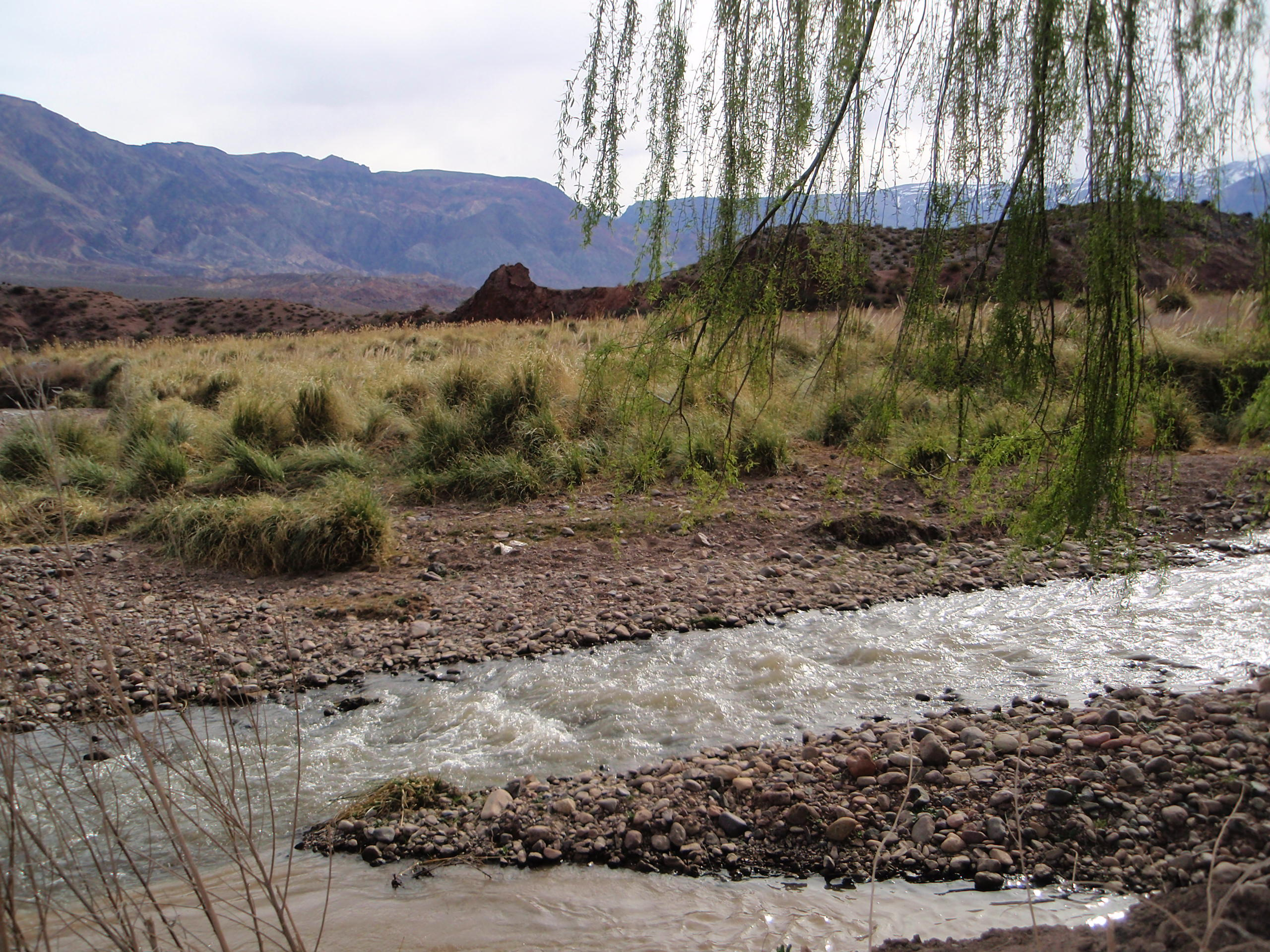
Typical landscape of Uspallata

Uspallata is a village and administrative district in Argentina, in a scenic location on the road that crosses the Andes between Mendoza and Santiago in Chile. It is located 100 km (62 mi) west of Mendoza and was once served by the now disused Transandine Railway which passed through the town on its way from Mendoza to Los Andes in Chile.

== Features ==
There are several items of interest in and around the village including "las bovedas," somewhat strangely egg-shaped kilns dating from the early 17th century which were used to extract gold, silver, zinc, copper and other metals from minerals mined nearby. Worth a brief visit as they are only approx 1.5 kilometres (1 mi) from town, complete with a small museum, notes include the fact that some of the refractory bricks can still be seen with "Rufford Stourbridge" from the English West Midlands stamped on them; a brief reminder of Britain's industrial heritage.

The road to the Chilean border incorporates scenery in the region, with the Andean mountains in this part being part of the backdrop of the highest peak outside of the Andes, Aconcagua at almost 7,000 metres (23,000 ft) above sea level. There is a brief glimpse of the mountain from the road some distance from another point of interest, an ochre coloured bridge spanning the Mendoza River 72 kilometres (45 mi) from Uspallata that seems to have been made from sulphur-bearing hot springs.

== Geography ==
=== Climate ===
Uspallata has a cold desert climate (Köppen: BWk), with an average annual precipitation of 156 millimetres (6.1 in). Summers have pleasant days and cool nights, and winters are chilly to cold, with the possibility of snowfall.

Climate data for Uspallata
Month	Jan	Feb	Mar	Apr	May	Jun	Jul	Aug	Sep	Oct	Nov	Dec	Year
Mean daily maximum °C (°F)	25 (77)	24.1 (75.4)	21.4 (70.5)	18.4 (65.1)	14.3 (57.7)	11.5 (52.7)	11.2 (52.2)	12.2 (54.0)	14.2 (57.6)	17.3 (63.1)	21.1 (70.0)	23.9 (75.0)	17.9 (64.2)
Daily mean °C (°F)	17.1 (62.8)	16 (61)	13.4 (56.1)	10.6 (51.1)	7.4 (45.3)	5 (41)	4.6 (40.3)	5.2 (41.4)	7.1 (44.8)	10.1 (50.2)	13.1 (55.6)	16 (61)	10.5 (50.9)
Mean daily minimum °C (°F)	9.2 (48.6)	8.0 (46.4)	5.5 (41.9)	2.8 (37.0)	0.5 (32.9)	−1.5 (29.3)	−2 (28)	−1.7 (28.9)	0 (32)	2.9 (37.2)	5.2 (41.4)	8.2 (46.8)	3.1 (37.5)
Average precipitation mm (inches)	24 (0.9)	25 (1.0)	15 (0.6)	6 (0.2)	6 (0.2)	8 (0.3)	9 (0.4)	11 (0.4)	7 (0.3)	9 (0.4)	16 (0.6)	20 (0.8)	156 (6.1)
Source: Climate-data.org, altitude: 1894m

== Transportation ==
Uspallata is served by Uspallata Airport.
