= Pablo Lucero =

Argentine military person (c.1800–1856)

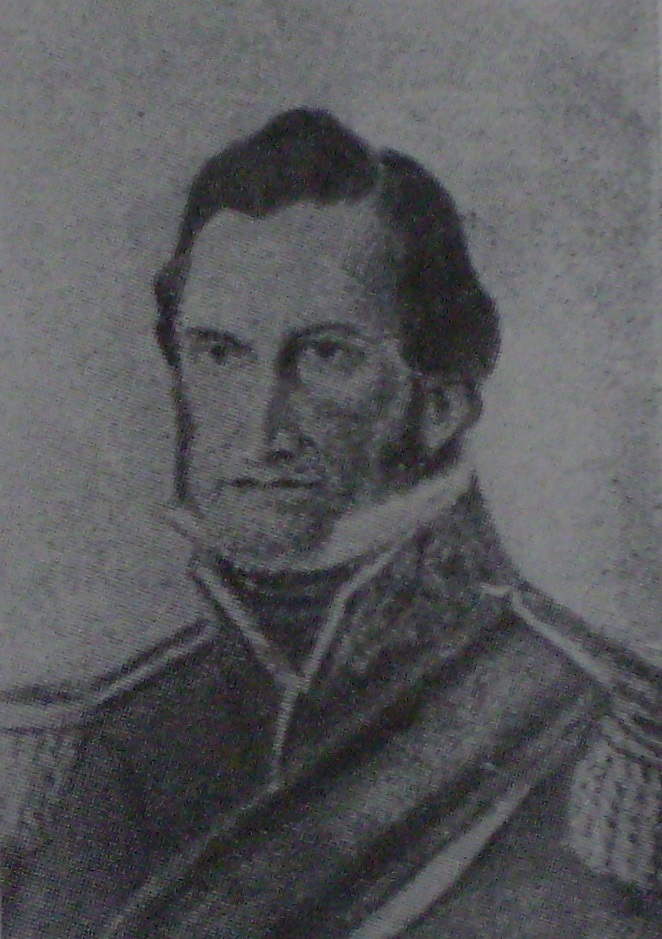

Governor of San Luis Province
- In office 2 January 1841 – 8 November 1854
- Preceded by: Triunvirato de San Luis
- Succeeded by: Justo Daract

Personal details
- Born: c. 1800 San Luis, Viceroyalty of the Río de la Plata (now in Argentina)
- Died: 12 September 1856 San José del Morro
- Party: Federalist
- Spouse: Dominga Pérez

Pablo Lucero (c. 1800 - 12 September 1856) was an Argentine soldier, a leader of the Federalist Party, and governor of San Luis Province throughout the 1840s.

== Early years ==
Pablo Lucero was born near San Luis, Argentina around 1800, son of a rancher. He joined the provincial militia in the 1820s. He participated in the civil war of 1830 on the Federalist side under General Facundo Quiroga, and reached the rank of lieutenant colonel. He was seriously wounded during a raid by the Ranquel chief Yanquetruz on San Luis in November 1832.

After that, Lucero was given command of the southern border of the province during the government of José Gregorio Calderón, and was also part of the legislature. As such, he was one of the deputies who enacted the first constitution of the province in January 1832. He participated in the 1833 Desert Campaign, under the orders of Jose Ruiz Huidobro, and fought at Las Acollaradas against Yanquetruz. Lucero was placed in command of the border in San José del Morro. In October 1834 he repelled a new invasion of Indians with much difficulty.

On 11 November 1840, a combined action of Indians led by their Chief and Unitarian Colonel Manuel Baigorria, and the Unitarian division led by Eufrasio Videla, took the city of San Luis. Despite the desertion of his men, Lucero retreated to the north of the province, staying true to the deposed governor. He raised new forces and called to his aid the Mendozan José Félix Aldao and General Pablo Alemán, who accompanied him to victory in the Batalla of Las Quijada. (Note: The battle occurred in today's Sierra de las Quijadas National Park.) Baigorria returned to camp accompanied by the future General Juan Saá.

== Governor ==
Lucero was elected governor of San Luis in a popular assembly on 5 January 1841. He immediately joined Aldao's army in defense against the invasion of San Juan by the Unitarian General Gregorio Aráoz de Lamadrid. But he became lost in the desert, which spared him the shame of defeat in the Battle of Angaco. He accompanied Nazario Benavídez in recovering San Juan Province in the Battle of La Chacarilla, and Ángel Pacheco in the Battle of Rodeo del Medio. He was promoted to the rank of general by the legislature.

Lucero's government was, as in most of Argentina in the 1840s, a time of peace without major upheavals and without great progress. This tranquility allowed the slow economic recovery in the province. The Indian raids (Malóns) ceased almost completely, and the population grew rapidly. Trade, livestock and agriculture flourished, while the governor remained at peace with the central government of Juan Manuel de Rosas.

In 1851, Lucero repudiated Justo José de Urquiza's proclamation and offered military aid to Rosas. (Note: None of the governors who offered help to Rosas against Urquiza actually helped in any way, except Echagüe.) After the fall of the Rosas, he traveled to San Nicolás de los Arroyos to sign the San Nicolás Agreement. (Note: According to tradition, Lucero was the only one of the governors who did not travel to San Nicolas in a carriage, but crossed half of Argentina on horseback.) On his return, he sent forces to help Benavídez regain power in San Juan. Aided by his Minister Juan Carlos Rodríguez he founded some schools and refounded several villages that had been destroyed by the Indian raids. He also established a printing press.

== Last career ==
In November 1854, Lucero left the province in the hands of Justo Daract, a progressive liberal who took the middle ground between the Unitarians and Federalists. He had a series of conflicts with the governor, and participated in the suppression of a riot in Rio Cuarto. In February of the following year, Urquiza named him commander of the Southern Military Division. He did not provide any services to the Argentinian Confederation in that position, as he died in San José del Morro in March 1856.
