= Luis Pereyra =

Argentine dancer and choreographer

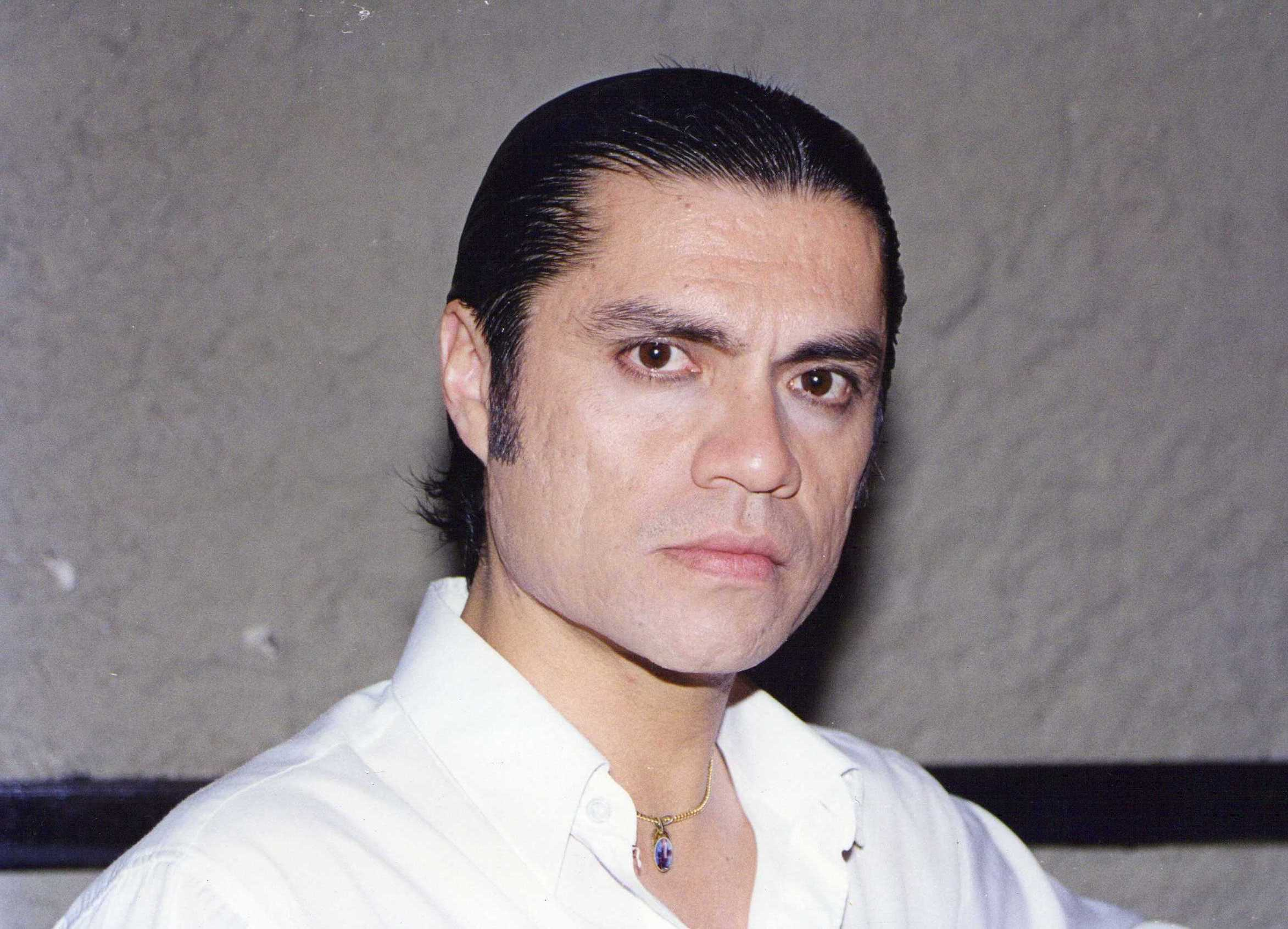
- Luis Pereyra
- Born: July 9, 1965 (age 61); Santiago del Estero, Argentina

Luis Pereyra (born 9 July 1965) is an Argentine dancer and choreographer of Tango Argentino and Argentine folk dances.

== Life ==
Luis Pereyra was born to a humble working-class family, in the province of Santiago del Estero. At the age of five he danced in folk dancing groups. At the age of eleven he made his first professional appearance as a member of the ballet Argentino directed by Mario Machaco and Norma Ré. He made his first appearance on stage at the legendary Caño 14, where the famous bandoneón player Aníbal Troilo appeared at the same time. Later Luis Pereyra became a member of the Ballett Salta, directed by Marina and Hugo Jiménez.

Luis Pereyra studied choreography under Maestro Alfredo Caruso direction in Teatro Colón, the opera house of Buenos Aires, and at Escuela Nacional de Danzas. He took studies with renowned maestros such as Santiago Ayala "El Chúcaro", Hugo Jiménez, Mario Machaco, Héctor Zaraspe, Irene Acosta, Ana Marini, Vasil Tupin and Mercedes Serrano. His professional education comprises modern dance, classical ballet, jazz dance, folk dances, tap dance and he studied music.

He took part in all of the outstanding tango productions, e.g., Forever Tango, Tango Pasión, and, from 1987 to 2000, in the musical Tango Argentino, produced by Claudio Segovia and Héctor Orrezoli. It was here that Luis Pereyra was nominated for a Tony Award. He went on tour through the US, Canada, Great Britain, Germany, Japan, Austria, Switzerland and France. In 2001 he danced the solo part in the opera Orestes – Last Tango, directed by choreographer Oscar Araiz, produced on the occasion of WMTF Festival, the Netherlands. In the course of his career he danced on the important stages e.g., Gershwin Theater on Broadway, Théâtre du Châtelet, Paris, Aldwych Theatre in London's West End - where in June 91 Lady Diana assisted the performance, Cologne Philharmonie, Alte Oper in Frankfurt am Main and Deutsches Theater München (Munic). In 1994 he danced for Paramount Pictures and was presented by Al Pacino. In 1995 he danced in the Castro Theater in San Francisco on stage with Robin Williams and Peter Coyote.

Luis Pereyra was invited to Buckingham Palace to show Lady Diana and King Charles III, then Prince Charles, the Tango Argentino. The journalist Colin Wills then published an article in the Sunday Mirror with a photo collage of both couples.

Luis Pereyra's choreographic work is influenced mainly by his Argentine origin. His works are closely related to popular and folk dances and show a pure choice of elements. His oeuvre is based on his principle: "Unity. What belongs together, should not be separated." He regards the culture of Argentine as a unity, and Tango Argentino as an integral part of Argentine folklore. From his very start he has followed this principle. It is his aim to unite all of Argentine's dances on one stage: Argentine Tango, Chacarera, Milonga, Milonga Sureña ("Souther Milonga"), Zamba, Gato and Malambo, Chamamé just to mention a few of them, being on the same level, in connection with each other and creating a picture of the country Argentine as a whole, as one unity.

Tom Noga wrote on 19 August 2004 in Frankfurter Rundschau, German daily paper: "El Sonido de mi Tierra is a revue of dance and music. A declaration of love to Argentine, her people and landscapes."

In most of his productions, Pereyra personally takes part as a dancer and musician. Among his last productions you can find Café de los Angelitos – El Tango as well as all of the productions of his music and dance company El Sonido de mi Tierra (The Sound of my Earth).

Since 2001, Pereyra has collaborated with his partner under the name of Nicole Nau & Luis Pereyra. The company he created in 1996 is named El Sonido de mi Tierra - The Great Dance of Argentina. In 2016, he renamed the company to El Sonido de mi Tierra - VIDA! Argentino.

== Selected appearances as choreographer and dancer ==
- 1986: A todo Tango, with Mariano Mores - Brazil, Ecuador, Costa Rica, Mexico
- 1987–2000: Tango Argentino, Musical by Claudio Segovia and Héctor Orezzoli - USA, Canada, Great Britain, Germany, Japan, Switzerland, The Netherlands and France
- 1988: Tango 88, with Leopoldo Federico - Japan
- 1990: Forever Tango - USA
- 1991: Tango with Orquesta Juan d'Arienzo - Japan
- 1991: Tango 91, with El Sexteto Tango - Japan
- 1994: Forever Tango - USA
- 1994: Festival Cosquín 34th edition - Argentina
- 1995: Tango Pasión, with José Libertella and the Sexteto Mayor - Germany, Spain, The Netherlands, Great Britain
- 1998: Tango La Danza De Fuego - Argentina
- 1999–2000: Tango Pasión, with José Libertella and the Sexteto Mayor - Germany, Greece, Great Britain
- 2001: El Baile, with Peteco Carabajal - Buenos Aires, Argentina
- 2001–2006: Tango en el Viejo Almacén - traditional tango theater - Buenos Aires, Argentina
- 2001: Latin Dance Carnival - Japan
- 2002: Orestes last Tango, tango opera, WMTF World Music Theatre Festival - the Netherlands, Belgium
- 2003–2005: El Sonido de Mi Tierra – Personalísimo - Europe, Argentina
- 2006: Bailando en Soledad – Tango! - Europe, Argentina
- 2007: Secretos de la Danza...Tango! - Europe, Argentina
- 2007–2010: Café de los Angelitos – El Tango - Buenos Aires, Argentina
- 2009: Argentinísima - Julio Márbiz - Los 40 años - Buenos Aires, Argentina.
- 2009: El Color de mi Baile - Europe, Argentina
- 2010–2011: El Viejo Almacén Artistic Director - Argentina
- 2011: Tango Puro Argentino tour Europe
- 2011: Aquí!!! Folklore Teatro Astral, Buenos Aires Argentina. Artistic Director. Artists: Cuti & Roberto Carabajal, El Chaqueño Palavecino, Suna Rocha, Zamba Quipildor, Nicole Nau, Leopoldo Federico, Mario Alvaréz Quiroga, Julia Elena Dávalos. Created by Julio Márbiz
- 2011: Misa Criolla at the place of the Monumento a la Bandera, Rosario Argentina. Choreography, Dance and Percussion. Artists: the tenor Zamba Quipildor and Luis Lima.
- 2011: Misa Criolla at the Plaza Mayor of Monte Grande Argentina. Choreography, Dance and Percussion. Life transmission on TV by the Argentine channel C5N. Artists: Zamba Quipildor and the Oscar winner Soledad Villamil.
- 2011: 7th Festival Internacional de Tango in Justo Daract, San Luis Argentina. Choreography, Dance and Artistic Director for the Viejo Almacén. Live transmission by the Argentine Television Channel 26. Artists: Hugo Marcel and Nelly Vázquez.
- 2012: Tango Puro Argentino on board of the cruise ship MS Deutschland, Traumschiff. Artists: Carlos Galván
- 2012: Festival de la Chacarera, Santiago del Estero
- 2012: Cronica TV - Argentinisima La Peña de Martin Márbiz Artistic Direction of the TV Programm since 18.3.2012
- 2012: Carabajalazo in the City Center Rosario
- 2012: Tango Puro Argentino y más! artistic director, choreographer and artist. Première at the Centro Cultural Borges, Buenos Aires 17 June 2012. Further Tour through Europe, as Berlin Tipizelt, Theaterhaus Stuttgart, Konzerttheater Coesfeld
- 2012: SWR 3 Germany, Menschen der Woche, Frank Elstner
- 2012: Performance in Laferrere with Chaqueño Palavecino, live on TV C5N
- 2012: Tango Puro Argentino y más! in Rio Tubio
- 2013: Festival Cosquin with Claudio Pereyra Cordoba
- 2013: Festival Cosquin Interpretation Vidala para mi Sombra with Oscar El Chaqueño Palavecino Cordoba
- 2013: El Sonido de mi Tierra artistic direction, choreography and performance. Debut in the Teatro Sala Siranush, Buenos Aires, 9 February 2013
- 2013: Viejo Almacen in Buenos Aires, special guests in the running show since February 2013
- 2013: Viejo Almacén, artistic direction since June 2013
- 2013: Das Traumschiff, show on MS Deutschland
- 2013: DAS! Abendmagazin, NDR TV Live Show 27.9.2013
- 2013: Tour 2013 El Sonido de mi Tierra - The great dance of Argentina. Premiere 29.9.2013
- 2013–2014: El Viejo Almacén Artistic Direction
- 2014: Festival Cosquin Edition 54. Presentation with the own company El Sonido de mi Tierra.
- 2014: Performance during the presentation of the book of Nicole Nau Tanze Tango mit dem Leben in the German embassy, Buenos Aires Deutschen Botschaft Buenos Aires. The event was organized by ambassador Graf Bernhard von Waldersee and his wife Gräfin Katerina von Waldersee.
- 2014–2015: Tour in Europe with the own production VIDA, in more than 70 places as Musical Dome Köln, Colloseum Essen, Philharmonie München, Theaterhaus Stuttgart, World Forum The Hague, Kampnagel Hamburg
- 2016: Bayerischen Filmpreis, with actors as Bruno Ganz, Till Schweiger, Uschi Glas
- 2017: Tour in Europe with "Vida! Argentino". Derniere at Folies Bergère, Paris.
- 2018: Tour in Europe "Vida!", Deutschland, Belgium, Netherland, Austria
- 2018: Tour in Europe "Tanze Tango mit dem Leben", Germany, Switzerland
- 2019: Tour in Europe "Vida!", Germany, Austria, Switzerland. 25 years Futuro Si at Tonhalle Düsseldorf
- 2019: Tour in Europe "Se dice de mi", Germany, TV Programme in Austria and Germany
- 2022: VIDA Tour in Argentina, Germany, Switzerland, Austria
- 2024: Gira por Europa con VIDA
- 2025: Homage 55 aniversario Ballett Salta en el Auditorio de Radio Nacional Argentina con Maestro Hugo Jiménez, en el Teatro Metropolitan, Buenos Aires Calle Corrientes.
- 2025: Hommage Santiago Ayala El Chúcaro im El Pial, Buenos Aires
- 2025: Teatro Metropolitan, Buenos Aires CABA, 55 años de esplendor, Ballet Salta, Hugo y Marina Jiménez
- 2025: NDR DAS

== Awards and nominations ==
- 2000: nomination for the Tony Award as best revival of a musical for Tango - Argentino
- 2012: Tango Puro Argentino y Más was declared as De Interés Cultural by Secretaría de Cultura de la Presidencia de la Nación, Ref.Expete.S.C.Nro 6020/12
- 2016: His production Vida! Argentino and company El Sonido de mi Tierra was declared as De Alto Interés Artistico y Cultural, Dirección General del Ministerio de Relaciones Exteriores y Culto el día 31 de mayo 2016, NOTA DICUL 273/2016

== Publications ==
=== DVDs and CDs ===
- 2004: Curso de Tango & Folklore Argentino. ICARO Producciones.
- 2004: El Sonido de mi Tierra. ICARO Producciones.
- 2007: Bailando en Soledad Tango. DVD of the presentation on stage.
- 2008: Secretos de la Danza, music CD of the show.

=== Written works ===
- 2025: Der Klang meiner Erde, Nicole Nau & Luis Pereyra, PalmArtPress Verlag, Berlin. 300 pages ISBN 978-3-96-258-211-1
