= Vicente Goico =

Puelche chief

- Died: Mendoza
- Allegiance: Argentina
- Battles / wars: Rosa's Campaign

Vicente Goico was a Puelche chief, and godson of José Félix Aldao.

== Background ==
His family controlled the territories south of the Diamante river, since they had gained recognition of the occupation of these lands in 1805 by word of Rafael de Sobremonte. Both Vicente Goico and his father, Marcos Goico swore loyalty to the Argentines.

Alférez Ángel Baez had been trying to obtain the lands that the Goico family occupied since 1814. The Argentine government appointed Ángel Baez to act as a mediator to decide on the territories. It was he who mediated with Vicente Goico in Malargüe to convince him and take him to Mendoza. He was received with great displays of affection and entertainment by staying at his friend Báez's house. Goico had free access to Argentine streets and frequented public offices. On May 11, 1825, he transferred his lands to Angel Baez, being some more than a million hectares between the rivers Atuel, Salado and the aforementioned Diamante.

== Rosa's Desert Campaign ==
He helped the Argentines during the Desert campaign, especially aiding the forces of Félix Aldao. He was responsible for the killing of a chief allied to Yanquetruz, Chief Barbón was a Pampa chief who inhabited Butanilague, he was beheaded and speared to scorn Yanquetruz.

=== Death ===
Vicente Goico died during a battle against the Pincheira brothers south of the city of Mendoza.
