= Puelche people =

Extinct South American ethnic group

Puelche
Gününa künä
- Flag of the Puelche people

Total population
- 2260 (2022)

Regions with significant populations
- Argentina (northern Patagonia, southern Cuyo, and Pampas)

Languages
- Historically: Gününa Yajüch; Currently: Spanish · Mapuche

Related ethnic groups
- Tehuelche · Selkʼnam · Teushen · Pehuenche

The Gününa küna (Guennakin), or sometimes Puelche (Mapudungun: pwelche, "people of the east") were Indigenous peoples living east of the Andes Mountains in Chile and Southwest Argentina.

They were annihilated by plagues and epidemics in the late 18th century, with survivors merging into other groups such as the Mapuche, Het, and Tehuelche.

== Language and name ==
pwel "east"
- People: Gününa künä (Puelche)
- Language: Gününa Küne
- Country: Pwelmapu

They spoke the Puelche language, which went extinct around the 1970s. Currently, there are efforts to revitalize the language.

The name "Puelche" was not an autonym but was given to them by the Mapuche.

== Lifeways ==
The Puelches, like the Pehuenches, were hunters, gatherers, and fishermen. They used bows, arrows, and — after the arrival of the Mapuche — spears.

They were tall and stout and dressed in fur quillangos (cloaks) and turbans of rolled threads with nets that covered their heads and on which they attached feather ornaments. They build their houses with branches and hides.

They cooked food and heated water in bark containers with hot stones.

They made canoes with larch boards, cooked and caulked, easily disassembled to be carried on their shoulders through the Andean passes, which allowed them to interact with the Huilliches but above all with the Chonos of southern Chile, very close to them.

== History ==
=== Precolonization ===
When the Spanish arrived, the Pehuenches and Puelches were hunter-gatherers. The populations were integrated around small bands that thrived off of hunting guanacos, rheas and Andean deer; as well as gathering fruits; the Puelches Algarroberos of the northern parts of Neuquén and the Andean area collected the fruit of the Araucaria, and those of Cuyo, foraged the fruit of the carob tree.

During hunting and war they showed their skill in handling bolts and arrows. They made their houses or tents with branches and skins and settled near rivers and estuaries. The bands were presided over by an elder who acted as Lonko or head of the family.

=== Puelches Algarroberos ===
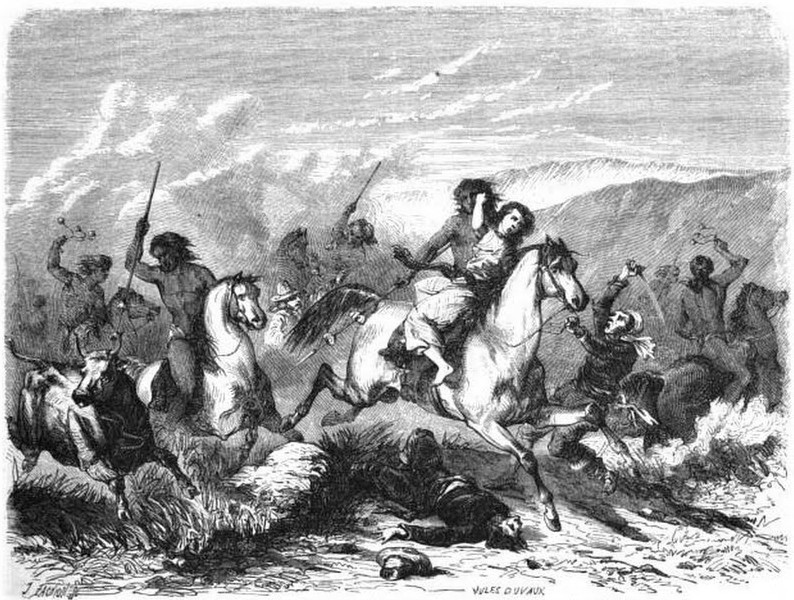
Depiction of the Puelche in the Le Tour du Monde.

The Puelches algarroberos (Puelches of the Algarroba), also called Puelches de Cuyo were a people related to the huarpean Pehuenches, living in Mendoza and the northern parts of Neuquén, to the south, their neighbors were the Pehuenches, and to the north by the Huarpes.

During the Campaign of the Desert, in 1833, a chief part of a Puelche Algarrobero subgroup, Vicente Goico, aided the forces of José Félix Aldao.

=== 1833 Desert Campaign ===
A Rankülche chief, Yanquetruz, had fought the Argentines since their combat in Acollaradas, there he won against the forces of Ruiz Huidobro while he attempted to surprise him at his settlement in Leubucó, southern Córdoba, where he made them retreat to Córdoba, Juan Manuel de Rosas proclaimed; "Yanquetruz and his son Pichún will be persecuted, and their heads will be delivered to me".

Aldao, after hearing about the results of the battle, decided to ambush the chief, with help of Puelche chief, who Aldao had adopted as his godson, Vicente Goico.

After various military victories, Aldao had sent various chiefs fleeing south; one of them, Barbón, an elderly puelche chief subordinated to Yanquetruz; who was ordered to be killed by Aldao, then he was found, beheaded and spiked by Goico, his head being left in the coast of the Salado River, with the pretext of scorning Yanquetruz.

Goico died during a fight with the Pincheiras Brothers, near Mendoza.

== Namesakes ==
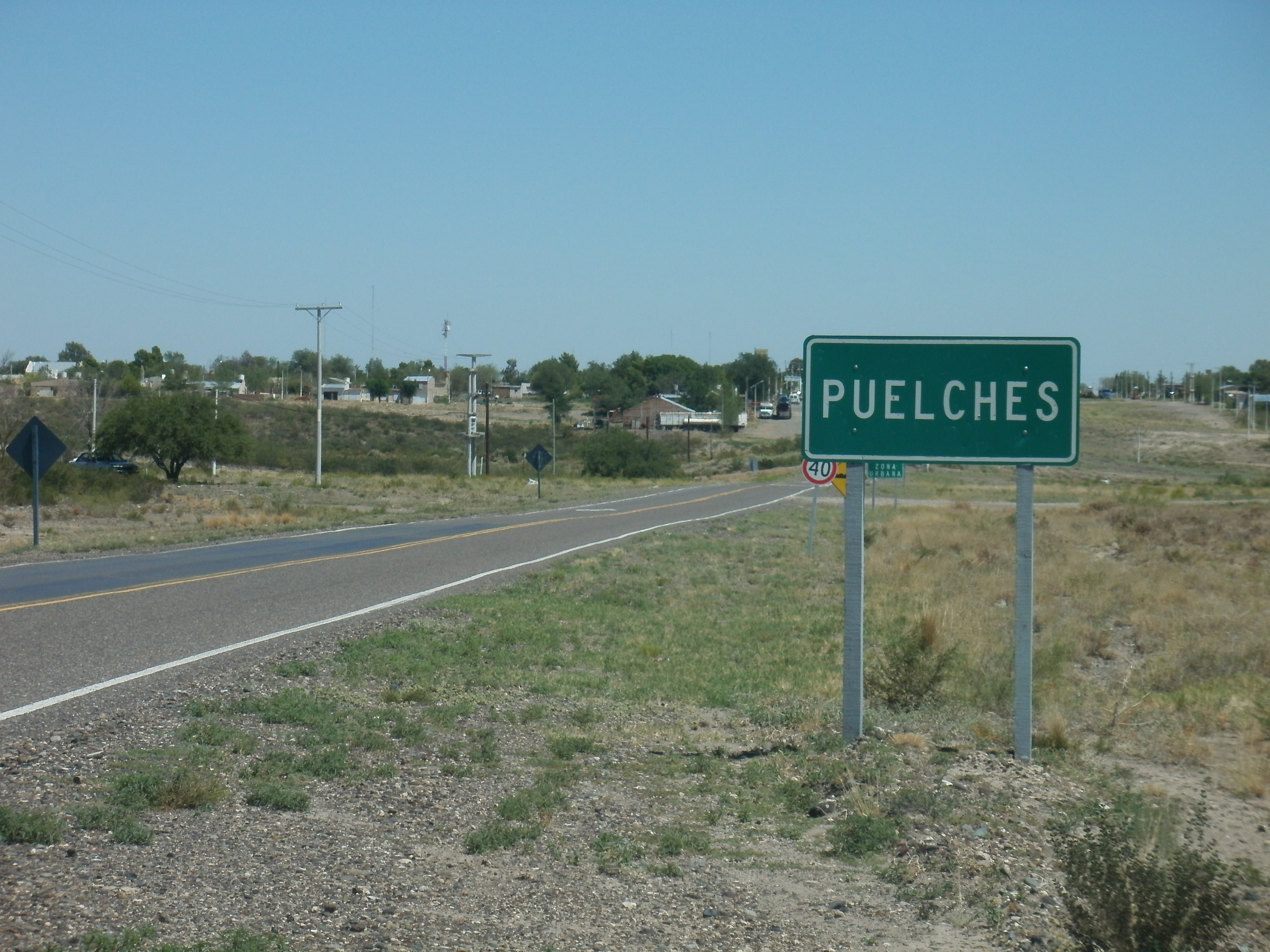
Sign for the Puelches town in La Pampa, Argentina, named after the group.

The Puelche are commemorated in the scientific names of two species of lizards, Liolaemus gununakuna and Liolaemus puelche, which are endemic to Argentina.

== Sources ==
- Thomas Falkner, Description of Patagonia and the adjoining parts of South America, Pugh, Hereford, 1774.
- Juan Ignatius Molina, The Geographical, Natural, and Civil History of Chili, Longman, Hurst, Rees, and Orme, London, 1809
- Bruce G. Trigger, Wilcomb E. Washburn, Richard E. W. Adams, The Cambridge History of the Native Peoples of the Americas, Vol III South America Part 2., Cambridge University Press, 2000.
