= Nicole Nau =

German-Argentine dancer

Nicole Nau (born 30 January 1963) is a German dancer of Tango Argentino and Argentine folklore living in Argentina and Germany.

== Life ==
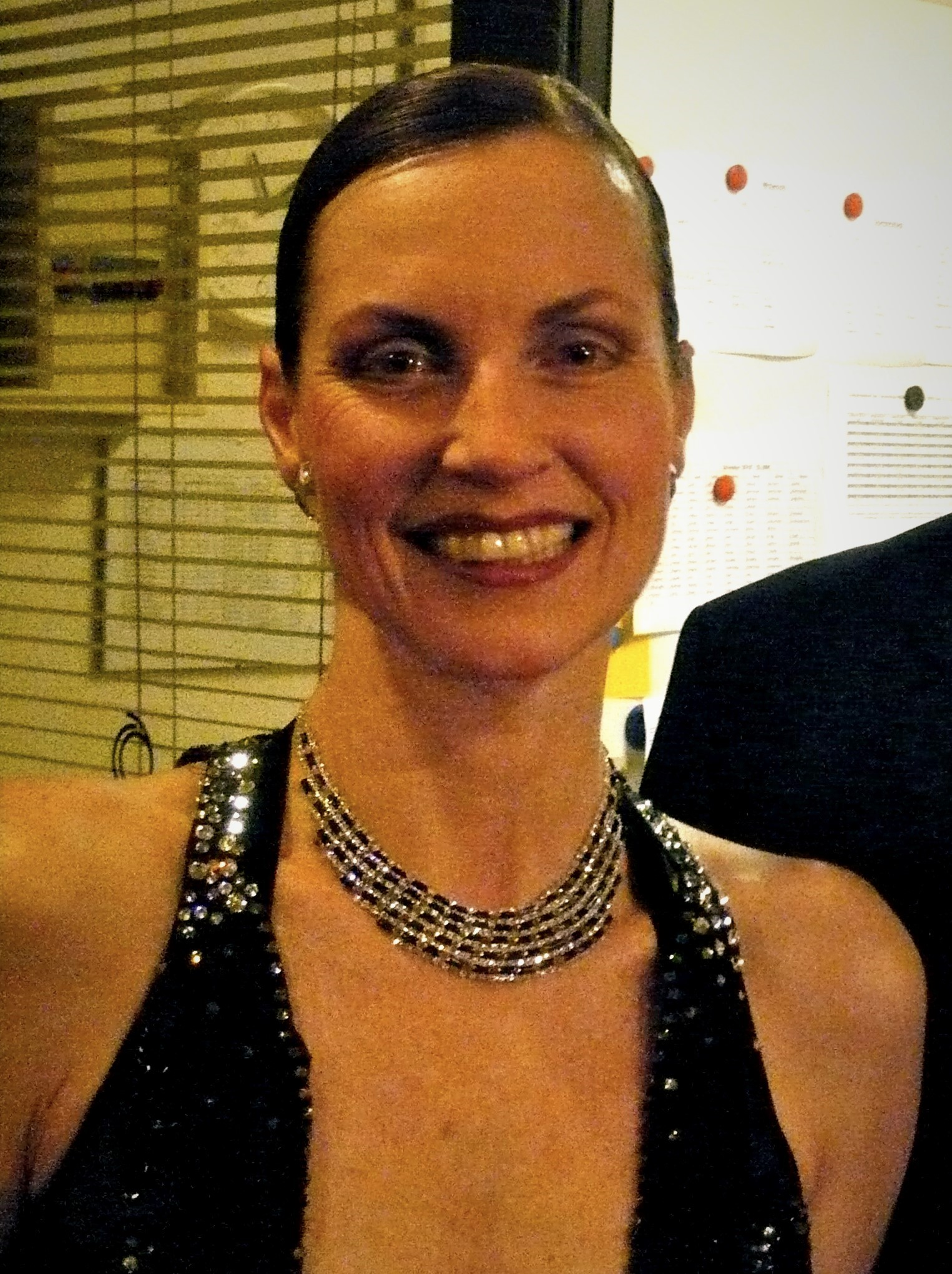
Nicole Nau in 2010

Nau was born in Düsseldorf, and after studying graphic design she first worked for advertising agencies before she settled in Argentina to be formally instructed as a professional dancer. She studied classical Ballet with Teatro Colon dancer and primaballerina Nadia Muzyka and Graciela Bertotti

In 1989 she has been part for several months of the Argentine company acting in Toronto, Canada. In 1990 she had her first appearance as main dancer in Café Homero to be followed by an engagement as a dancer in the opera Maratón Teatro Colón opera house in Buenos Aires where she was designed to dance with bass Mario Solomonoff as double for the mezzo-soprano Ana Ruanova

In 2002 she had her premiere with the tango opera Orestes – Last Tango, which was created in a co-production with the WMTF Festival of Holland. It was here that she danced with Luis Pereyra for the first time who is her husband and dance partner now.

Under direction of Luis Pereyra she dances in the company El Sonido de mi Tierra and produces several own productions, as the last one, VIDA. In 2007 they reopened as the artistic directors the renowned tango theater Café de los Angelitos in Buenos Aires. In 2010 they are artistic directors at the Viejo Almacén and 2011 in Aqui Folklore.

She went on tour dancing through nearly all continents. Since 2016 Nicole Nau lives again in Germany where she runs her own stage productions.

In addition to Tango Argentino and Argentine folklore, her musical dance training includes classical dance (Studio Katja Krüger Wuppertal, Estudio Nadia Muzyka, Quilmes Buenos Aires), Jazz Dance (Ballett Studio Berger, Düsseldorf), Progressing Ballett Technic (Ballett Studio Regine Dieckhoff, Wuppertal), Flamenco (Rosa Montés & Alberto Alarcón, Essen), piano studies (Engelbrecht, Düsseldorf).

Nau does the costume design for several Tango Argentino and Folklore Argentino productions.

Nau has published her book Tanze Tango mit dem Leben (Dance Tango with Life) at Bastei Verlag Lübbe at Frankfurt Buchmesse, 11 October 2013. The second edition has been printed in January 2014 .

Since 2016 she produces in Europe and Argentina.

== Books ==
- Nicole Nau: Tanze Tango mit dem Leben. Bastei Lübbe Verlag, Köln 2013, ISBN 978-3-404-60756-3.
- Nicole Nau-Klapwijk: Tango Dimensionen, Kastell Verlag GmbH 1999, ISBN 978-3-924592-65-3.
- Nicole Nau-Klapwijk: Tango, un baile bien porteño, Editorial Corregidor 2000, ISBN 950-05-1311-0
- 2025: Der Klang meiner Erde, Nicole Nau & Luis Pereyra, PalmArtPress Verlag, Berlin. Book 300 pages ISBN 978-3-96258-211-1

== Merits and tributes ==
- 1993: COMFER, Comité Federal de Radiodifusión, awarded her and her former partner Ricardo for their cultural contribution, handed over by León Guinsburg
- 2000: a stamp of their own based on a photo taken by Máximo Parpagnoli, issued by the Argentine postal service commemorating tango's 100. birthday (first issued on 11 November 2000).
- 2001: a second stamp with the same photo and a new motif, issued by the Argentine postal service on behalf of Japanese-Argentine friendship on the occasion of the world stamp exhibition in Japan (first issued on 28 July 2001).
- 2012: Tango Puro Argentino y Más has been declared as De Interés Cultural by Secretaría de Cultura de la Presidencia de la Nación, Ref.Expete.S.C.Nro 6020/12
- 2014: Nicole Nau & Luis Pereyra Company is nominated as Member of the International Dance Council CID | UNESCO by CID Präsident Dr. Alkis Raftis
- 2016: VIDA! ARGENTINO – El Sonido de mi Tierra has been declared as DE ALTO INTERÉS ARTISTICO Y CULTURAL, Dirección General del Ministerio de Relaciones Exteriores y Culto el día 31 de mayo 2016, NOTA DICUL 273/2016

== DVDs and CDs ==
- 2004: Curso de Tango & Folklore Argentino. ICARO Producciones. Nicole Nau & Luis Pereyra
- 2004: El Sonido de mi Tierra. ICARO Producciones. Nicole Nau & Luis Pereyra
- 2007: Bailando en Soledad Tango. DVD of the performance. Nicole Nau & Luis Pereyra
- 2008: Secretos de la Danza. music of the Show, CD, Nicole Nau & Luis Pereyra
- 2011: Tango Puro Argentino & Más, Show, DVD, Nicole Nau & Luis Pereyra. Apollo Varieté Theater Düsseldorf. Guido Gayk
- 2012: Tango Puro Argentino & Más – with extraordinary company, DVD, Nicole Nau & Luis Pereyra and other artists. Theatre CCBorges. ICARO
- 2012: El Sonido de mi Tierra, DVD, Nicole Nau & Luis Pereyra. Extraordinary company, Theatre Lünen Stadttheater. CAMEO
- 2012: Nuestro Tango, Tutorial Video, DVD, Nicole Nau & Luis Pereyra. Guido Gayk

== Selected appearances ==
- 1989: Music Hall Theatre, direction Rimolo & Mr. Young
- 1993: Maratón, directed by Jaime Kogan, Teatro Colón, Argentine
- 1994: Festival Cosquín 34 edition – Argentina
- 1994: Festival Villa Allende with Susana Rinaldi
- 1996: Tour with Dala Sinfoniettan, Sweden
- 1997: Japón '97, Japan
- 1999: WMTF Festival Holland, the Netherlands
- 2003–2006: Viejo Almacén, traditional tango theater
- 2009: Argentinísima, los 40 años, Julio Márbiz, choreography Luis Pereyra, Buenos Aires
- 2011: Misa Criolla at the place of the Monumento a la Bandera, Rosario Argentina. Choreography, Dance and Percussion. Artists: the tenor Zamba Quipildor and Luis Lima.
- 2011: Misa Criolla at the Plaza Mayor of Monte Grande Argentina. Choreography and Dance. Live transmission on TV by the Argentine channel C5N. Artists: Zamba Quipildor and the Oscar winner Soledad Villamil.
- 2011: 7 Festival Internacional de Tango in Justo Daract, San Luis, Argentina. Choreography, dance and artistic director for the Viejo Almacén. Live transmission by the Argentine Television Channel 26. Artists: Hugo Marcel and Nelly Vázquez.
- 2012: Festival de la Chacarera, Santiago del Estero
- 2012: Carabajalazo in the City Center Rosario
- 2012: SWR 3 Germany, Menschen der Woche, Frank Elstner
- 2012: Performance in Laferrere with Chaqueño Palavecino, live on TV C5N
- 2012: Tango Puro Argentino y más! in Rio Turbio
- 2013: Festival Cosquin with Claudio Pereyra Cordoba
- 2013: Festival Cosquin Interpretation Vidala para mi Sombra with Oscar El Chaqueño Palavecino Cordoba
- 2013: Viejo Almacen in Buenos Aires, special guests in the running since February 2013
- 2013: Das Traumschiff, show on MS Deutschland
- 2013: DAS! Abendmagazin, NDR TV Live Show 27 September 2013
- 2013: Tour 2013 El Sonido de mi Tierra – The great dance of Argentina. Premiere 29 September 2013
- 2014: Presentation of the book of Nicole Nau Tanze Tango mit dem Leben in the German embassy, Buenos Aires Deutschen Botschaft Buenos Aires. The event was organized by ambassador Graf Bernhard von Waldersee and his wife Gräfin Katerina von Waldersee.
- 2014: Tour in Europe VIDA
- 2015: Tour in Europe VIDA, World Forum Amsterdam
- 2016: Bayerischen Filmpreis, with actors as Bruno Ganz, Till Schweiger, Uschi Glas
- 2022: Teatro Astral, Buenos Aires VIDA

== Selected own productions ==
- 2002: Orestes – Last Tango, tango opera, choreography: Oscar Araiz, a co-production with WMTF Festival Holland
- 2004–2005: El Sonido de mi Tierra, Choreografy Luis Pereyra – – Europe (e.g., Tonhalle Düsseldorf, Königliches Tropeninstitut Amsterdam (KIT), Teo Otto Theater Remscheid, NDT The Hague)
- 2006: Bailando en Soledad, choreography Luis Pereyra – Europe, Argentine
- 2007: Secretos de la Danza, choreography Luis Pereyra, Dramaturgy Julio López – Europe, Argentine
- 2009: El Color de mi Baile, choreography Luis Pereyra – Europe, Argentine
- 2007–2010: Theatre Café de los Angelitos – El Tango, artistic direction, choreography Luis Pereyra – Buenos Aires
- 2010–2011: El Viejo Almacén Artistic Direction -Argentina
- 2011: Tango Puro Argentinogira por Europe
- 2011: Aqui!!! Folklore Teatro Astral, Buenos Aires Argentina. Co Dirección Artística con Luis Pereyra. Artistas: Cuti & Roberto Carabajal, El Chaqueño Palavecino, Suna Rocha, Zamba Quipildor, Leopoldo Federico, Mario Alvaréz Quiroga, Julia Elena Dávalos. Una creación de Julio Márbiz
- 2012: Tango Puro Argentino on board of the cruise ship MS Deutschland, Traumschiff. Artists: Carlos Galvan
- 2012: Cronica TV – Argentinisima La Peña de Martin Marbiz Artistic Direction of the TV Programm since 18 March 2012
- 2012: Tango Puro Argentino y más! artistic direction, costume design and dance. Premiere in the Centro Cultural Borges, Buenos Aires on 17 June 2012 Further Tour through Europe, as Berlin Tipizelt, Theaterhaus Stuttgart, Konzerttheater Coesfeld
- 2013: El Sonido de mi Tierra artistic direction, costume design and dance. Premiere in Teatro Sala Siranush, Buenos Aires 9 February 2013
- 2013: Viejo Almacén, artistic direction since June 2013
- 2014: Festival Cosquin Edition 54. Presentation with the own company El Sonido de mi Tierra.
- 2014–2015: Tour through Europe with the own production VIDA, in over 70 venues, such as Musical Dome Köln, Colloseum Essen, Philharmonie München, Theaterhaus Stuttgart, World Forum The Hague, Kampnagel Hamburg
- 2017: Tour in Europe with "VIDA! ARGENTINO". Derniere at Folies Bergère, Paris.
- 2018: Tour in Europe "Vida!", Deutschland, Belgium, Netherland, Austria
- 2018: Tour in Europe "Tanze Tango mit dem Leben", Germany, Switzerland
- 2019: Tour in Europe "Vida!", Germany, Austria, Switzerland. 25 years Futuro Si at Tonhalle Düsseldorf
- 2019: Tour in Europe "Se dice de mi", Germany, TV Programme in Austria and Germany
- 2022: VIDA Tour in Argentina, Germany, Austria, Switzerland
- 2024: Tour in Europe VIDA Show
- 2025: Dancing with Würth Philharmoniker, and music from Director
- 2025: Homage 55 years Ballett Salta in the theatre of Radio Nacional, Buenos Aires, Teatro Metropolitana Buenos Aires
- 2025: Hommage Santiago Ayala El Chúcaro, El Pial, Buenos Aires
