= Ramón Sorayre =

Argentine militia officer and politician

Sargento Mayor Ramón Sorayre

1st Military Commander of the City of Rosario
- In office 1838–1845
- Governor: Juan Pablo López
- Preceded by: ?
- Succeeded by: ?

Personal details
- Born: Joseph Ramón Sorayre; 1798 Rosario, Viceroyalty of the Rio de la Plata
- Died: c. 1850 Rosario, Argentina
- Spouse: Mercedes Jaime

Military service
- Allegiance: (Argentina) United Provinces of the River Plate; Argentine Confederation
- Branch/service: Argentine Army
- Years of service: c. 1818–c. 1850
- Rank: Sergeant major
- Commands: Regimiento de Dragones of Rosario
- Battles/wars: Military expeditions against the Indians; Battle of Famaillá; Battle of Vuelta de Obligado

Ramón Sorayre (1798 – c. 1860) was an Argentine militia officer and politician, who served as Commandant in Rosario, Santa Fe, Argentina. He took part in the Argentine Civil Wars, and in punitive expeditions against the Indigenous that ravaged the southern area of Santa Fe towards the end of 1830.

== Biography ==
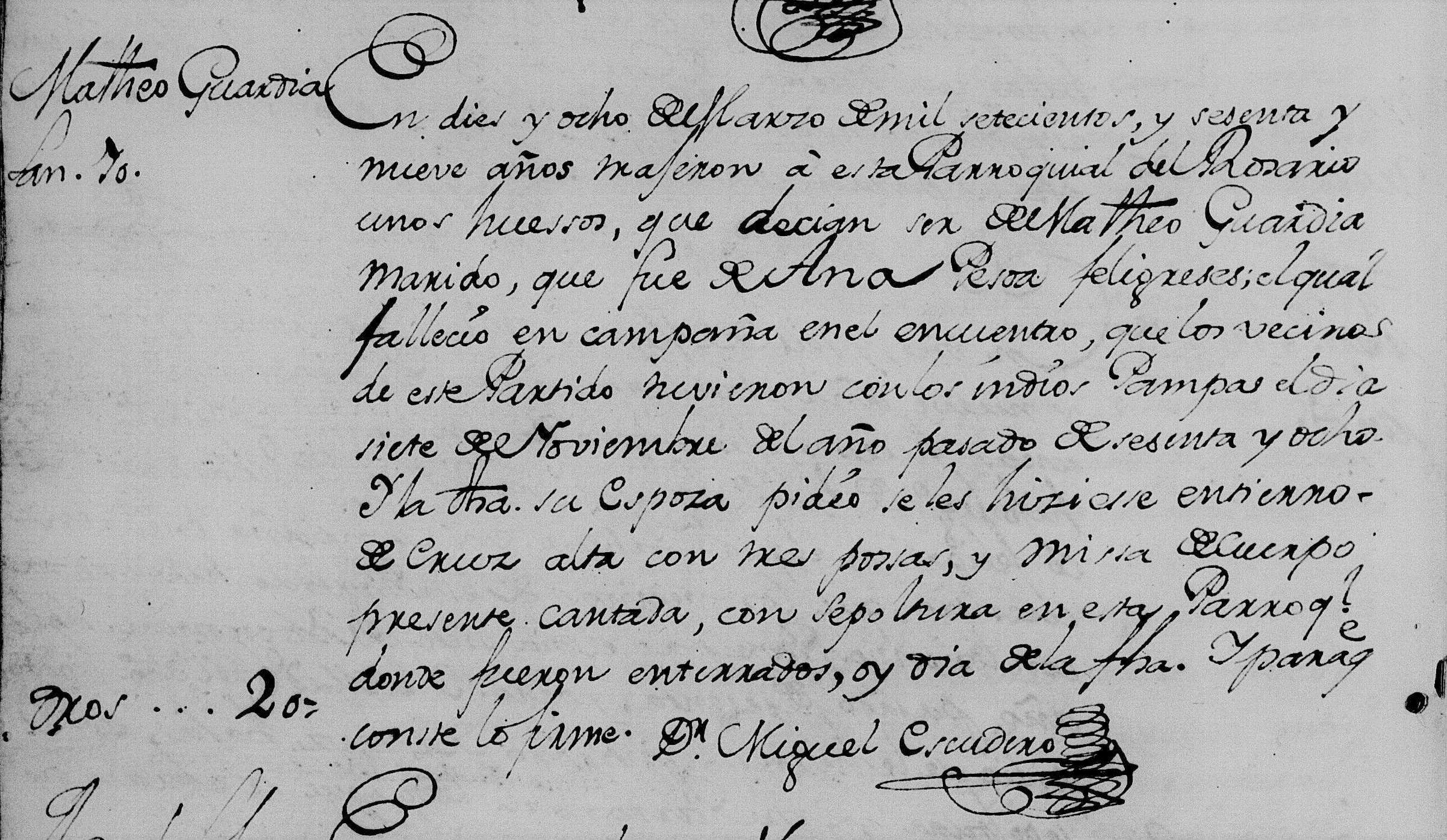
Death certificate of his ancestor (Mateo Guardia).

He was born in Rosario, Santa Fe, son of Luciano Sorayre and Isidora Montenegro. His paternal grandparents were Francisco Sorayre and Sebastiana Casco, belonging to an old Creole family of Santa Fe Province, descendants of Spanish conquerors, linked to the Casco, Rodríguez Verdejo and Luján Romano families.

He began his career in the provincial militias of Santa Fe around the year 1818. In early 1830 he was commissioned as Commandant in the 1° escuadrón de artillería of Santa Fe Province. In 1838, Sorayre participated in military campaigns against the Indians, who had invaded the south of the province, serving under the command of Juan Pablo López. In 1838 he took an active part in the defense of Santa Fe against a contingent of nine hundred Ranqueles under the command of Colonel Manuel Baigorria.

Ramón Sorayre had active participation in civil conflicts between federales and unitarios. In February 1840, Rosario was center of an attack commanded by Juan Lavalle. During the battle, Sorayre take part in the defense of the city, giving orders to open fire against a corvette and four French brigs, allies of Lavalle. In 1841, he served at the orders of the General Manuel Oribe, taking part in the Battle of Famaillá against the troops of Juan Lavalle.

His ancestor Mateo Guardia was killed during the incursion of the Pampas tribes to the city of Rosario on November 7, 1768.
