= Guillermo Rivarola =

Argentine former footballer (born 1967)

Personal information
- Full name: Guillermo Daniel Rivarola
- Date of birth: 28 April 1967 (age 59)
- Place of birth: Villa Huidobro, Argentina
- Height: 1.77 m (5 ft 10 in)
- Position: Defender

Senior career*
Years	Team	Apps	(Gls)
1986–1991	Club Cipolletti	197	(12)
1991–1996	River Plate	135	(7)
1997	Pachuca	22	(3)
1998	Santos Laguna	34	(1)
1999–2000	Pachuca	12	(1)
1999–2000	Monterrey	30	(2)
2001–2002	San Lorenzo	35	(4)
2002–2003	Racing Club	21	(2)

Managerial career
- 2004: Racing Club
- 2007: Olimpo
- 2009–2010: Pachuca
- 2011: Sporting Cristal
- Komets-River Plate
- * Club domestic league appearances and goals

Guillermo Daniel Rivarola (born 28 April 1967, in Villa Huidobro, Argentina) is an Argentine former footballer. He played as a defender for many clubs in Argentina and Mexico such as River Plate, San Lorenzo, Racing Club. He retired playing for Racing.

Rivarola won 3 Primera Division Argentina with River Plate and 1 with San Lorenzo. He had a short tenure in Mexico playing for Pachuca and for Monterrey. As manager he coached Racing Club and Olimpo. On 4 June 2009, he was named Manager of C.F. Pachuca where he won the 2009–10 CONCACAF Champions League. Later he was the Director of Pachuca Youth System Development.

On 21 December 2010, Guillermo Rivarola was named Manager of Sporting Cristal from Peruvian First Division League for the 2011 season. On 20 March 2011, he was involved in a bitter dispute with fellow Argentine manager Marcelo Trobbiani of Cienciano after protesting to the referee in order to get him sent off.

Accomplishments as River Plate Technical Secretary Copa Sudamerica 2014 Recopa Sudamerica 2014 Copa Libertadores de America 2015 Copa Suruga Bank 2015 Recopa Sudamerica 2015 Copa Argentina 2016 and 2017 Supercopa Argentina 2017

== Honours ==
=== Player ===
River Plate

- Primera Division Argentina: Apertura 1991, Apertura 1993, Apertura 1994
- Copa Libertadores: 1996

San Lorenzo

- Primera Division Argentina: Clausura 2001

=== Manager ===
Pachuca

- CONCACAF Champions League: 2009–10
