= General Roca (disambiguation) =

General Roca may refer to a number of things and places named after Argentine military Julio Argentino Roca:

== Places ==
=== Argentina ===
- General Roca, Río Negro
- General Roca Department, Río Negro
- General Roca Department, Córdoba
- Villa General Roca town in San Luis Province

=== Others ===
- Ferrocarril General Roca Argentine railway line connecting Buenos Aires with Zapala.
- Roca Cup defunct football (soccer) tournament play by Argentina and Brazil.
