= Villa Huidobro =

- City
- Location of Villa Huidobro in Argentina
- Coordinates: 34°50′S 64°35′W
- Country: Argentina
- Province: Córdoba
- Department: General Roca

Government
  - Intendant: Enzo Fernando Quiroga

Population
  - Total: 5,155
- Time zone: UTC−3 (ART)
- CPA base: X6275
- Dialing code: +54 2336

Villa Huidobro (also known as Cañada Verde) is a city in the southwest of the province of Córdoba, Argentina. It has 5,155 inhabitants per the 2001 census [INDEC], and is the head town of the General Roca Department. It lies about 380 km south of the provincial capital Córdoba, and 18 km north of the provincial border with La Pampa. Villa Huidobro is named after José Ruiz Huidobro, governor of San Luis Province, who commanded the central column of the 1833 Desert Campaign that defeated Ranquel chieftain Yanquetruz at the battle of Las Acollaradas Lakes near the city.
