= General Roca Department =

General Roca Department may refer to:

- General Roca Department, Río Negro
- General Roca Department, Córdoba
