= El Sonido de mi Tierra - The Great Dance of Argentina =

El Sonido de mi Tierra is a company from Argentina, for Tango Argentino and Folklore Argentino, founded by Luis Pereyra in 1996. "El Sonido de mi Tierra" means "The sound of my land". The Great Dance of Argentina is the international name of the same company, but used outside of Argentina and Spanish speaking countries. Both names are of the same company and same production.

== History ==
"El Sonido de mi Tierra" was founded in 1996 with the "peña folklóica artística", organized by Luis Pereyra in "La Galería de Tango". He promoted an event in Buenos Aires, with the idea to bring together artists of both cultures of Argentina, which has been separated always: those of Argentine Folklore and those of Tango Argentino, and in this way he created a unification of one complete culture of Argentina, which represents all provinces of Argentina, which are 23, bringing them to a culture and art unification.

The creator of the company is Luis Pereyra. In 2001 Nicole Nau entered the company. 2003 she becomes first dancer of the company and also gets in the general and executive production. Nicole Nau and Luis Pereyra are members of CID Unesco.

1998 the company "El Sonido de mi Tierra" performs in theatre, the Teatro Avenida, Buenos Aires and presents "Tango La Danza de fuego", a production which tells the story of "Orillas Maldonadas", written by Luis Pereyra, based on "El hombre de la esquina rosada" of Jorge Luis Borges. In 2003 the company travels to Europe, later to Japan and Central America.

In 2012 appears for the first time the name "The Great Dance of Argentina". This name the company since then is using for international work, keeping the original name "El Sonido de mi Tierra" as always besides.

The necessary conditions and skills for artists of this company are founded on knowledge of popular dances and music of Argentina, Tango Argentino, percussion, tap dance, vocal and playing instruments.

Luis Pereyra and this company work with Tango and Folklore on a same level, as one only culture which belongs together. He follows strictly his principles to understand Tango Argentino as part of the whole Argentine Culture and Folklore. Being from Buenos Aires, the tango Argentino is the urban folklore. Roots of Folklore, Black Music, natives, migration inside the country and from abroad are showing up, in the relationship between Tango and Folklore. The instruments Luis Pereyra is using are the authentic ones of his country and those introduced by immigrants. The stage productions tells of the deepness of the culture, orientated on roots, archaic culture and symbols.

== Performances and tour ==
- 1996 Peña folklorica Artística
- 1998 Teatro Avenida Tango La Danza de Fuego "La Orilla del Maldonado"
- 2001 Performances in Centrer America and Japan
- 2002 Eigene Website.
- 2003 Rotationstheater Remscheid Lennep
- 2003 Teatro Empire
- 2004 Teatro Margarita Xirgu
- 2005 Rodeo de Bernal, Tonhalle Düsseldorf, Remscheid Teo Otto Theater
- 2006 Teatro Margarita Xirgu, Buenos Aires, Tour durch Europe
- 2007 Tour Europe
- 2008 Tour Europe
- 2009 Tour Europe
- 2010 Peña artística in Crónica TV
- 2011 Tour Europe
- 2012 First appearance as "The Great Dance of Argentina"
- 2013 "The Great Dance of Argentina" Tour durch Europa, Autritt im Festival de Cosquin
- 2014 Festival de Cosquin, "The Great Dance of Argentina" präsentiert seine neue Produktion VIDA
- 2017 Folies Bergére de Paris
- 2022 Teatro Astral Buenos Aires

== Cast ==
Some of the members who has been part of the company "El Sonido de mi Tierra - The Great Dance of Argentina": musicians: Peteco Carabajal, Los Carabajal, Cuti y Roberto Carabajal, Zamba Quipildor, Roxana Carabajal, Horacio Banegas, Suna Rocha, Leopoldo Federico, Carlos Galvan, Javier Tommasi, Marcelo Tommasi, Quique Ponce, Tony Elias Gallo, Daniel Rubén Gomez, Leandro Ragussa, Matias Rubino and others. Dancer: Charly Morales, Ivanna Carrizzo, Fernando Gimenez, Heber Mallorquin, Sofía Orlando, Culi Gomez, Adrian Bernal, Laura Tilve and others.
