= Liolaemus gununakuna =

Conservation status
- Least Concern (IUCN 3.1)

Scientific classification
- Kingdom: Animalia
- Phylum: Chordata
- Class: Reptilia
- Order: Squamata
- Suborder: Iguania
- Family: Liolaemidae
- Genus: Liolaemus
- Species: L. gununakuna

Binomial name
- Liolaemus gununakuna Avila, Morando, Perez & Sites, 2004

Species of lizard

Liolaemus gununakuna is a species of lizard in the family Liolaemidae. It is endemic to Argentina.

== Etymology ==
The specific name, gununakuna, is in honor of the Gününa küna, an aboriginal people who live in the area of the type locality.

== Geographic range ==
L. gununakuna is found in Neuquén Province and Río Negro Province, Argentina.

== Habitat ==
The preferred natural habitats of L. gununakuna are grassland and shrubland, at altitudes of 300–800 m (980–2,620 ft).

== Reproduction ==
L. gununakuna is ovoviviparous.
