= Mario Saccone =

Argentine footballer

Personal information
- Full name: Mario Osvaldo Saccone
- Date of birth: 28 August 1970 (age 56)
- Place of birth: San Luis, Argentina
- Height: 1.72 m (5 ft 8 in)
- Position: Forward

Senior career*
Years	Team	Apps	(Gls)
1993–1994	Gimnasia de Mendoza	–	(–)
1994–1999	Gimnasia La Plata	63	(4)
1997–1998	→ Coquimbo Unido (loan)	35	(6)
1999	→ Unión San Luis (loan)	–	(–)
1999–2000	Juventud Unida SL	–	(–)
2000–2001	Independiente Rivadavia	15	(5)
2001–2002	Gimnasia de Jujuy	35	(6)
2002	Defensa y Justicia	14	(4)
2003	Shandong Luneng	–	(–)
2004–2006	Defensa y Justicia	95	(13)
2007	Villa Mitre	15	(0)
2007–2011	Sportivo Italiano	129	(18)
2011–2012	Berazategui	15	(0)
2012	La Plata FC	–	(–)
Total		416	(56)
- * Club domestic league appearances and goals

Mario Osvaldo Saccone (born August 28, 1970, in San Luis, Argentina) is a former Argentine footballer who played as a forward.

== Career ==
As a player of Gimnasia y Esgrima de La Plata, Saccone was loaned for two seasons to Chilean Primera División side Coquimbo Unido in 1997. He left the Chilean club after having a fight with the goalkeeper Carlos Tejas. Back in Argentina, he had a brief stint with Unión from his city of birth, San Luis, before returning to Gimnasia La Plata in September 1999 and ending his contract with them a month later.

=== Teams ===
- (Argentina) Gimnasia y Esgrima de Mendoza 1993-1994
- (Argentina) Gimnasia y Esgrima de La Plata 1994-1996
- (Chile) Coquimbo Unido 1997-1999
- (Argentina) Juventud Unida Universitario 1999-2000
- (Argentina) Independiente Rivadavia 2000–2001
- (Argentina) Gimnasia y Esgrima de Jujuy 2001-2002
- (Argentina) Defensa y Justicia 2002
- (China) Shandong Luneng 2003
- (Argentina) Defensa y Justicia 2004-2006
- (Argentina) Villa Mitre 2007
- (Argentina) Sportivo Italiano 2007–2011
