= Pablo Oro =

Argentine footballer

Personal information
- Full name: Pablo Damián Oro
- Date of birth: 9 August 2002 (age 24)
- Place of birth: San Luis, Argentina
- Height: 1.83 m (6 ft 0 in)
- Position: Forward

Team information
- Current team: Villa Dálmine

Youth career
- 2016–2020: Huracán

Senior career*
Years	Team	Apps	(Gls)
2020–	Huracán	10	(1)
2022	→ Deportivo Riestra (loan)	4	(0)
2022–2023	→ Colegiales (loan)	20	(3)
2024	→ Estudiantes de Buenos Aires (loan)	3	(0)
2024–	→ Villa Dálmine (loan)	6	(0)

International career
2018	Argentina U17		
- * Club domestic league appearances and goals as of 21 September 2024

Pablo Damián Oro (born 9 August 2002) is an Argentine footballer who plays as a forward for Villa Dálmine on loan from Huracán.

== Club career ==
Oro joined Huracán in 2016. Up until June 2019, the forward would score forty-nine goals across their academy. A year prior, in June 2018, he signed a five-year contract with the club; with a $20,000,000 release clause, which was a record for Huracán at that time. The contract length was later shortened to three years due to administrative requirements. Oro moved into Israel Damonte's first-team squad in 2020, notably appearing on the bench for a Copa Sudamericana encounter against Atlético Nacional on 19 February. Oro's senior debut arrived on 13 December against Independiente in the Copa de la Liga Profesional.

== International career ==
In 2018, Oro received numerous call-ups from the Argentina U17s. He appeared in friendlies with the United States and Vélez Sarsfield, notably netting twice against the latter.

== Career statistics ==
As of 14 December 2020.

Appearances and goals by club, season and competition
Club	Season	League			Cup		League Cup		Continental		Other		Total	
Club	Season	Division	Apps	Goals	Apps	Goals	Apps	Goals	Apps	Goals	Apps	Goals	Apps	Goals
Huracán	2019–20	Primera División	0	0	0	0	0	0	0	0	0	0	0	0
Huracán	2020–21 (Note: Soccerway counts Copa de la Liga Profesional appearances as league appearances.)	Primera División	1	0	0	0	0	0	—		0	0	1	0
Career total			1	0	0	0	0	0	0	0	0	0	1	0
