= Ada I. Pastore =

Argentinian botanist (1906–1952)

- Born: April 1, 1906; San Luis, Argentina
- Died: July 1, 1952 (aged 46); Buenos Aires
- Education: University of Buenos Aires
- Scientific career
- Fields: Botanist
- Thesis: Las isoetáceas argentinas
- Author abbrev. (botany): Pastore

Ada Italia Pastore (1906–1952) was an Argentine botanist, curator, teacher, and explorer. She had a doctorate in biological science and developed academic activities at the Darwinion Botanical Institute and CONICET. She was a student of Lorenzo Raimundo Parodi and Arturo Eduardo Burkart.

== Biography ==
Pastore was born in San Luis, Argentina. She earned her Ph.D. in natural sciences from the University of Buenos Aires. Her doctoral work was on the genus Isoetes.

Following her Ph.D. she worked at multiple institutions including the Instituto de Botánica: Darwinión, Colegio Nacional Nicolás Avellaneda and the Colegio Nacional Bernardino Rivadavia Colegio N.º 1 Bernardino Rivadavia (Argentina). She was particularly known for her collaborative work with her Ph.D. advisor, Lorenzo Parodi.

Pastore died on July 1, 1952 and was remembered in the Boletin de la Sociedad Argentina de Botanica where she was commended for her skill in drawing and laboratory techniques. A session at the 1952 Segundas Jornadas Botanicas meeting was conducted in honor of Pastore.

== Selected publications ==
- Pastore, A.I. (1935). "Estudio microscópico del almidón de plantas alimenticias aborígenes". Rev. Argent. Agron. 2: 78–85.
- Pastore, Ada I. (1936). Las Isoetáceas argentinas (in Spanish). Buenos Aires: Instituto del Museo de la Universidad Nacional de La Plata. OCLC 60449618.
- PASTORE, ADA I. (1937), LAS OBRAS BOTÁNICAS ANTIGUAS EXISTENTES EN LA BIBLIOTECA DEL DARWINION, OCLC 9987313479
- Parodi, Lorenzo Raimundo; Pastore, Ada I. (1939). "Generos de Plantas Cultivadas: Representados en la flora indigena de la Republica Argentina". Physis. 18: 255–268.
- Pastore, Ada I. (1939). Las reservas nutritivas de los Piñones de las Araucarias Argentinas (in Spanish). Bueno Aires: Imprenta y Casa Editora Coni. OCLC 1029990701.
- Chamberlain, Charles Joseph; Pastore, Ada I. (1945). Elementos de botánica (in Spanish). Buenos Aires: Kapelusz. OCLC 981358578.
- Parodi, L.R.; Pastore, A.I. (1952). Rev. Argent. Agron. 19: 189–190.

== Honors ==
Pastore was named an honorary member of the Instituto de Botánica: Darwinión.

- Member: Argentine Federation of University Women (FAMU)
- Member: Argentine Botanical Society
- Director: Bulletin of the Argentine Society of Horticulture
