= Leandro Despouy =

Argentine human rights lawyer (1947–2019)

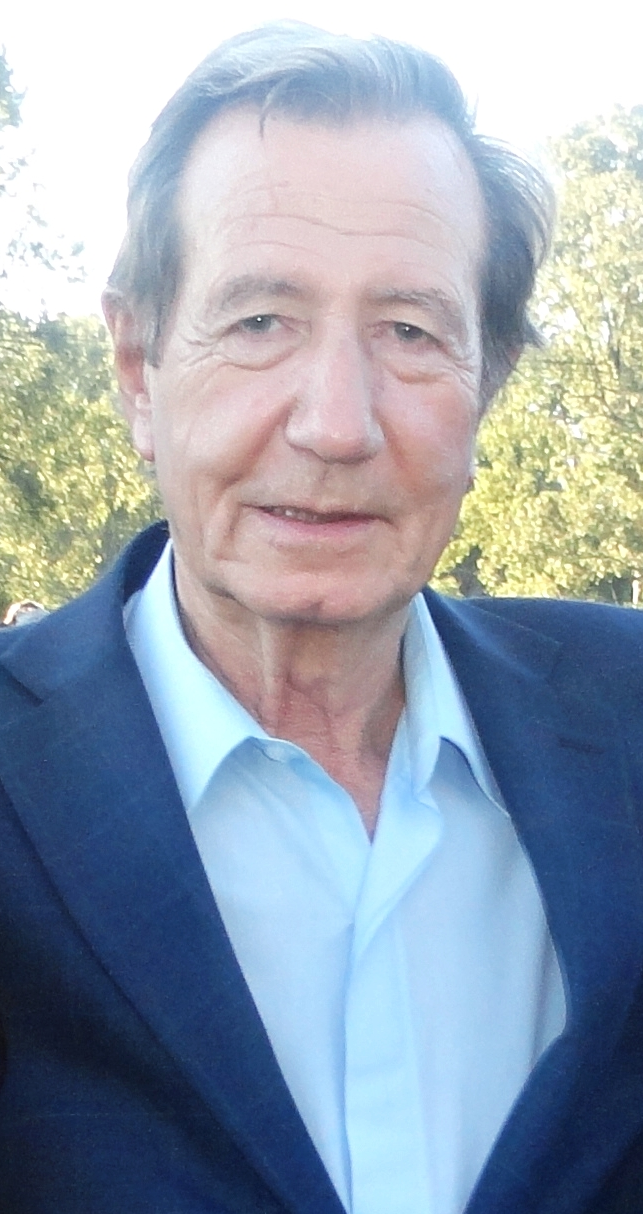

Leandro Despouy (April 4, 1947 – December 18, 2019), who was born in San Luis, Argentina, was an Argentine human rights lawyer. He was the United Nations Commission on Human Rights Special Rapporteur on the Independence of Judges and Lawyers from August 2003 until end of July 2009. He was also Special Rapporteur of the Sub-Commission on Prevention of Discrimination and Protection of Minorities

Despouy was one of the five authors of a report on human rights abuses committed against the extrajudicial captives the United States detainees at its naval base at Guantanamo Bay, Cuba.

He played a significant role for the recognition of extreme poverty as a human rights issue within the United Nations system.

In 2016 he was awarded the Premio Konex

From 2002 to 2016, Despouy was the president of the Auditoría General de la Nación of the Argentine Republic.
