= Liolaemus puelche =

Conservation status
- Least Concern (IUCN 3.1)

Scientific classification
- Kingdom: Animalia
- Phylum: Chordata
- Class: Reptilia
- Order: Squamata
- Suborder: Iguania
- Family: Liolaemidae
- Genus: Liolaemus
- Species: L. puelche

Binomial name
- Liolaemus puelche Avila, Morando, Perez & Sites, 2007

Species of lizard

Liolaemus puelche is a species of lizard in the family Liolaemidae. The species is endemic to Argentina.

== Etymology ==
The specific name, puelche, is in honor of the aboriginal Puelche people, who live in Mendoza Province, Argentina.

== Geographic range ==
L. puelche is found in Mendoza Province, Argentina.

== Habitat ==
The preferred natural habitat of L. puelche is shrubland, at an altitude of 1,600 m (5,200 ft).

== Description ==
Robust and medium-sized for its genus, L. puelche may attain snout-to-vent length (SVL) of almost 9 cm (3.5 in).

== Diet ==
L. puelche preys predominately on arthropods, but also eats some plant matter.

== Reproduction ==
L. puelche is oviparous.
