= Brigadier Mayor César Raúl Ojeda Airport =

Brigadier Mayor Cesar Raúl Ojeda Airport Aeropuerto de San Luis
- IATA: LUQ; ICAO: SAOU

Summary
- Airport type: Public
- Operator: Aeropuertos Argentina 2000
- Serves: San Luis, Argentina
- Elevation AMSL: 2,329 ft (710 m)
- Coordinates: 33°16′30″S 66°21′05″W

Map
- Location of airport in Argentina

Runways
Direction	Length		Surface
Direction	m	ft	Surface
01/19	2,950	9,678	Asphalt

Statistics (2016)
- Passengers: 94,384
- Passenger change 15–16: ▲44.7%
- Aircraft movements: 1,876
- Movements change 15–16: ▲18.77%
- Source: SkyVector GCM Google Maps

Brigadier Mayor César Raúl Ojeda Airport (Spanish: Aeropuerto de San Luis - Brigadier Mayor César Raúl Ojeda) (IATA: LUQ, ICAO: SAOU) is an airport in San Luis Province, Argentina serving the city of San Luis. It is operated by Aeropuertos Argentina 2000.

From March to May 2007, the airport was closed for repaving of its runway.

== Airlines and destinations ==
Airlines	Destinations
Aerolíneas Argentinas	Buenos Aires–Aeroparque

== Statistics ==
Traffic by calendar year. Official ACI Statistics
	Passengers	Change from previous year	Aircraft operations	Change from previous year	Cargo (metric tons)	Change from previous year
2005	48,726	▲3.60%	1,426	▲19.73%	230	▼2.95%
2006	44,788	▼8.08%	1,329	▼6.80%	111	▼51.74%
2007	31,509	▼29.65%	1,086	▼18.28%	66	▼40.54%
2008	27,452	▼12.88%	1,366	▲25.78%	92	▲39.39%
2009	36,990	▲34.74%	1,605	▲17.50%	20	▼78.26%
2010	38,280	▲3.49%	1,876	▲16.88%	41	▲105.00%
Source: Airports Council International. World Airport Traffic Statistics (Years 2005-2010)

== See also ==
- Transport in Argentina
- List of airports in Argentina
