= Justo Daract =

Argentine politician

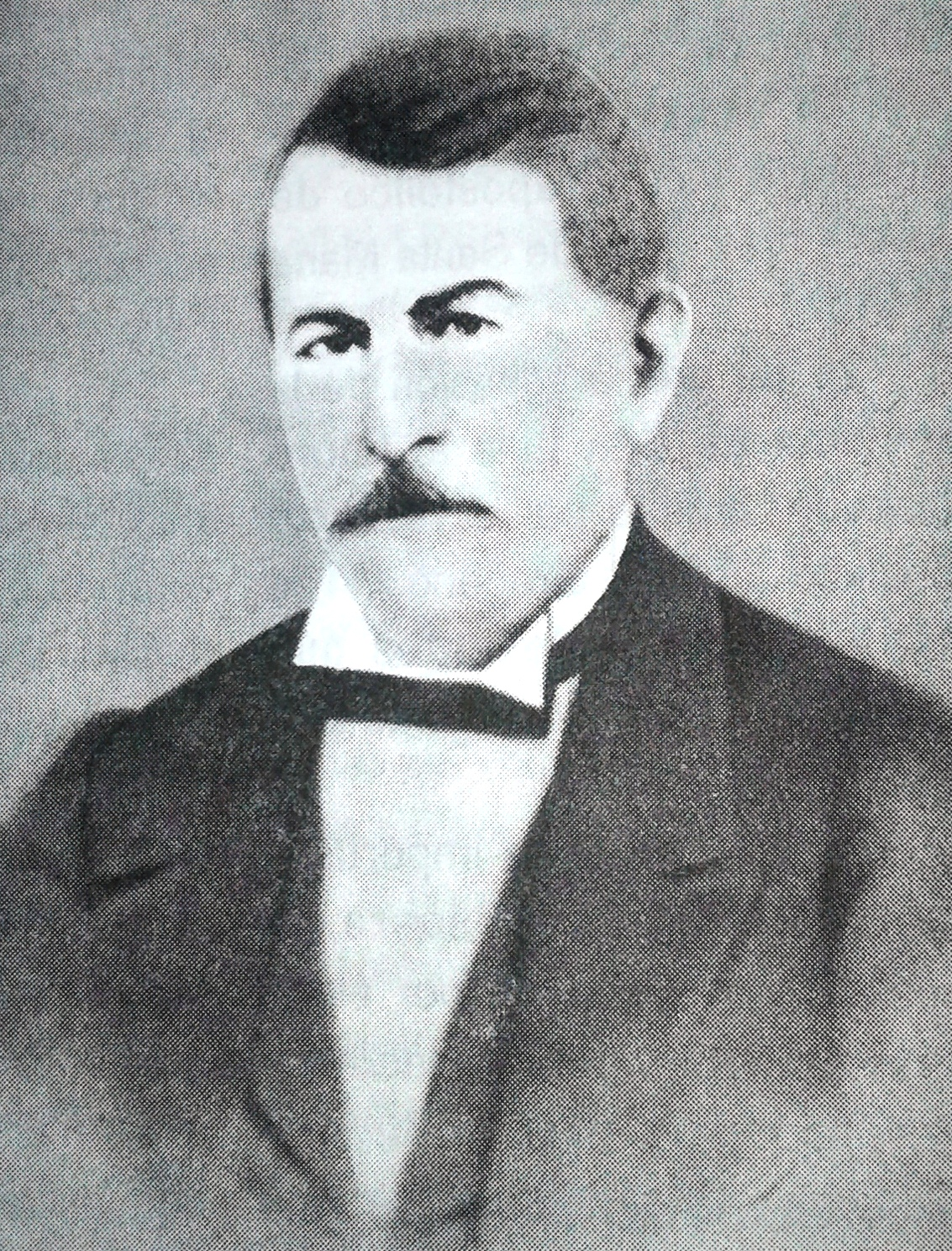
Governor of San Luis

Justo Daract (1804–1887) was an Argentine politician who served as governor of San Luis Province and in the Argentine Senate and Argentine Chamber of Deputies, representing that province.

== Life and times ==
Son of a French Argentine immigrant, Daract was born in San Luis, Viceroyalty of the Rio de la Plata, studied in Buenos Aires, and became a retailer. The alliance in 1840 of Córdoba and five smaller, northwestern provinces in a Northern Coalition against Buenos Aires Province Governor Juan Manuel de Rosas (the paramount figure in the Argentine Confederation) prompted Daract to join the Unitarian Party. Following the coalition's defeat in November, however, Daract fled to Chile, and reopened his former Buenos Aires business there. He received financial support from the governor of San Luis Province, Pablo Lucero, and stockpiled arms for an eventual return.

He returned to Argentina in 1850, and purchased a cattle ranch in San Luis Province, becoming an important supplier for the Army. He was named Civil Court magistrate in 1853, though by then, he had distanced himself from Governor Lucero, and led an alliance of both Unitarians and their enemies, the Federalists, against the governor. The alliance succeeded in persuading Lucero to step down, and on November 8, 1854, Daract was selected governor by an assembly. He enacted a new provincial constitution, and promptly called for elections. Daract won in the polls later that year, and became the first elected governor of San Luis.

The governor enacted numerous reforms during his tenure. He established a judicial system, subdivided the province into eight departments, established a system of public land leases over vast tracts of provincially owned pastures, founded the first newspaper in San Luis, regulated native American commerce, founded a strategically located fort (at what today is Villa Mercedes), and had a variety of infrastructure built in the pastoral province, as well as commissioning what became the Cathedral of San Luis (notable for its Neoclassical portico). Serving out his term, he stepped down in 1859, and was succeeded by General Juan Esteban Pedernera.

A series of disorders caused by the Federalist defeat at the Battle of Pavón led to Daract's re-appointment as governor by an assembly and with the support of Buenos Aires, in December 1861. Serving for five months, he mediated a truce between Unitarian general Wenceslao Paunero and La Rioja Province governor Chacho Peñaloza, who had invaded San Luis Province amid a renewed conflict with Unitarians; the truce resulted in the Treaty of La Banderita, which contributed to national stability by dissipating conflict in the Cuyo (western) region of Argentina.

Daract was elected to the Argentine Senate in 1863. He advocated for provincial autonomy and negotiated a truce between the national government and the Ranquel people that inhabited the San Luis area. He was elected to the Provincial Legislature, and in April 1865, to a third term as governor. A Federalist uprising in November 1866 forced Daract and his government to evacuate San Luis. Argentine Army troops, led by General José Miguel Arredondo, retook San Luis in the April, 1867, Battle of San Ignacio, however, and Daract regained his post.

The intervention made Daract a staunch supporter of the President, Bartolomé Mitre, and he was elected to the Lower House of Congress on Mitre's Liberal Party ticket, shortly after his May 1867 retirement as governor. He was a constitutional assemblyman during a number of amendment deliberations, and established the San Luis National College, and the Girls' Normal School in that province.

Daract died in Villa María, Córdoba, in 1887. The town of Justo Daract, San Luis was named in his honor.
