= San José del Morro =

Coordinates: 33°13′S 65°29′W

- Municipality and village
- Interactive map of San José del Morro
- Country: Argentina
- Province: San Luis Province
- Time zone: UTC−3 (ART)

San José del Morro is a village and municipality in San Luis Province in central Argentina.

Due to large numbers of German immigrants being absorbed in the late 19th century, both Spanish and German are commonly spoken in the vicinity.
