= Manuel Baigorria =

Argentine colonel (1809–1875)

- Born: 1809; San Luis, Viceroyalty of the Rio de la Plata
- Died: 1875 (aged 65–66); San Luis, Argentina
- Occupation: Soldier

Manuel Baigorria (1809–1875) was a soldier who fought in the Argentine Civil Wars. Of mixed origins, he spent many years living with the Ranqueles, an independent people who lived to the south of the area colonized by Europeans in what is now Argentina. He was recognized as a leader by the Ranqueles, who provided support to his Unitarian side in the civil wars.

== Early years ==
Manuel Baigorria was born in San Luis de la Punta de los Venados around 1809, son of Blas Baigorria and Petrona Ledesma. Ignacio Fotheringham, a contemporary, described him as short in stature but muscular, strong and agile, with reckless courage. Baigorria joined the army and became an officer while a young man. He served under the Unitarian General José María Paz and was captured in 1831 after the Battle of Rodeo de Chacón. It only through good luck that he avoided being included in a group of prisoners who were to be shot. Following that he decided to live with the Ranqueles in their tolderías.

== Indian raider ==
Baigorria became well-established among the Ranqueles, and recognized as a leader. He became a close friend of their chief Yanquetruz, who named his eldest son Baigorrita (little Baigorria). Over forty years he had four wives, three Christian and one a Mapuche. He became the adopted brother of the Ranquele chief Pichún.

In 1838 Baigorria led a party of Ranqueles on an unsuccessful raid into northern Buenos Aires Province and southern Santa Fe Province. Baigorria became a Colonel in the Unitarian forces. In November 1840 he took part in a revolution in San Luis Province, and after being defeated again returned to the Ranqueles. In April 1843 he led 600 Indians on a raid, which was repelled. In 1845 he launched a raid with 900 Indians and whites who had taken refuge in their tolderías. The Malónes, as the raids were called, were an effective method for assisting his political allies.

== Later years ==
After Juan Manuel de Rosas fell from power in 1852, Baigorria returned to the European side of the border. He forgot his old friendship to the point that he made several campaigns against the Indians on the border. He also fought on both sides in the civil wars at that time, the Argentine Confederation and the secessionist State of Buenos Aires. In his later years, he advised General Julio Argentino Roca, teaching him the secrets of the desert geography and the customs of the Indians. Roca was to make his reputation with his success against the Indians in his ruthless Conquest of the Desert.

Baigorria was sixty when he started to write his memoirs in 1868. He died on 21 June 1875 in San Luis. He died poor, but as a soldier his widow Lorenza Barbosa received a pension. From Baigorria's book, one gathers the impression of a modest person. Although at times he led horsemen on raids, he was not excessively greedy or bloodthirsty, mainly wanting foals, books and newspapers as his share of the loot. The historian Alvaro Yunque said of his life that it needed little change to make it a novel.

== Bibliography ==
- Baigorria, Manuel (2006). Manuel Baigorria memorias. El Elefante Blanco. ISBN 978-987-9223-75-8.
