= General Roca Department, Córdoba =

General Roca Department Departamento General Roca
- Department
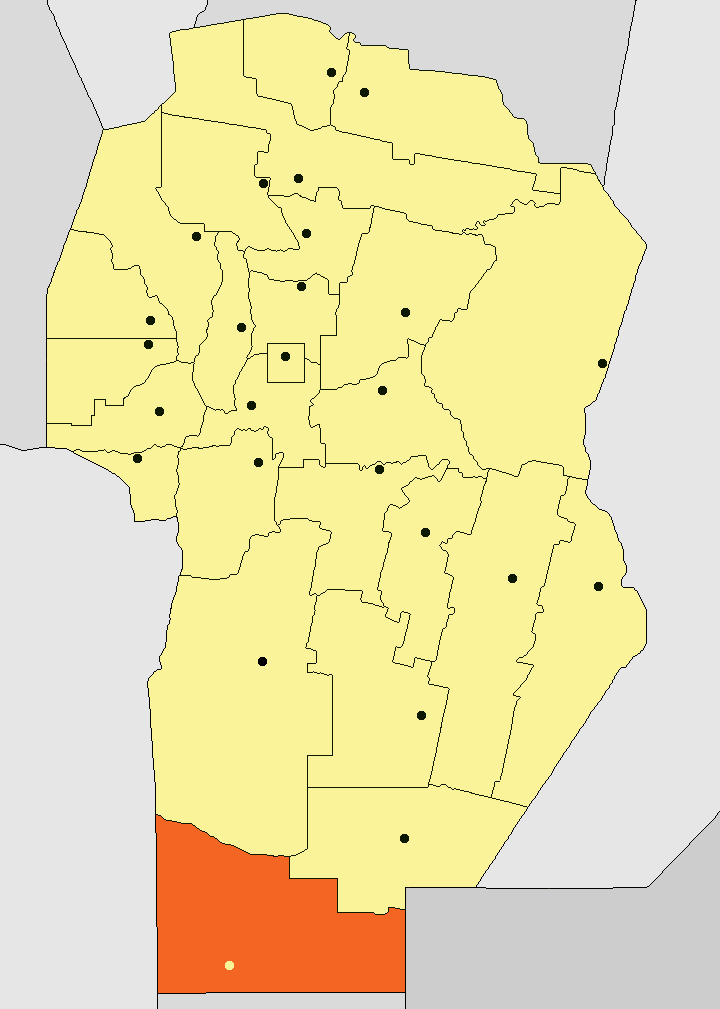
- Location of General Roca Department in Córdoba Province
- Coordinates: 34°49′S 64°34′W
- Country: Argentina
- Province: Córdoba
- Foundation: 23 July 1888
- Founder: provincial law
- Capital: Villa Huidobro

Area
  - Total: 12,659 km^{2} (4,888 sq mi)

Population (2001 census [INDEC])
  - Total: 33,323
  - Density: 2.6324/km^{2} (6.8178/sq mi)
  - Pop. change (1991-2001): +1.39%
- Time zone: UTC-3 (ART)
- Postal code: X6275
- Dialing code: 02336
- Distances to
- Buenos Aires: ?
- Córdoba: 452 km (281 mi)

General Roca Department is a department of Córdoba Province in Argentina.

The provincial subdivision has a population of about 33,323 inhabitants in an area of 12,659 km^{2}, and its capital city is Villa Huidobro.

== Settlements ==
- Buchardo
- Del Campillo
- Huinca Renancó
- Italó
- Jovita
- Mattaldi
- Nicolás Bruzzone
- Onagoyti
- Pincén
- Ranqueles
- Villa Huidobro
- Villa Sarmiento
- Villa Valeria
