= Canal 5 Noticias =

Argentine news cable channel

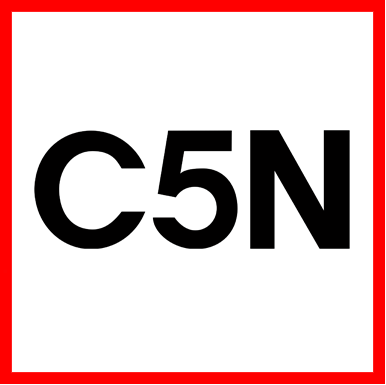
- Country: Argentina
- Broadcast area: Argentina; International
- Headquarters: Olleros 3551, Chacarita, (Edificios Juan Alberto Badía), Buenos Aires, Argentina

Programming
- Language: Spanish
- Picture format: 1080i HDTV

Ownership
- Owner: Grupo Indalo (Ideas del Sur)

History
- Launched: August 6, 2007
- Founder: Daniel Hadad

Links
- Website: www.c5n.com

Availability

Terrestrial
- Digital terrestrial television: Channel 25.1 (HD); Channel 25.2 (SD); Channel 25.31 (One-Seg)
- Antina: Channel 3

Canal 5 Noticias ("Channel 5 News", also known as C5N) is an Argentine pay television news channel launched on August 6, 2007.
