= San Luis, Argentina =

San Luis
- City
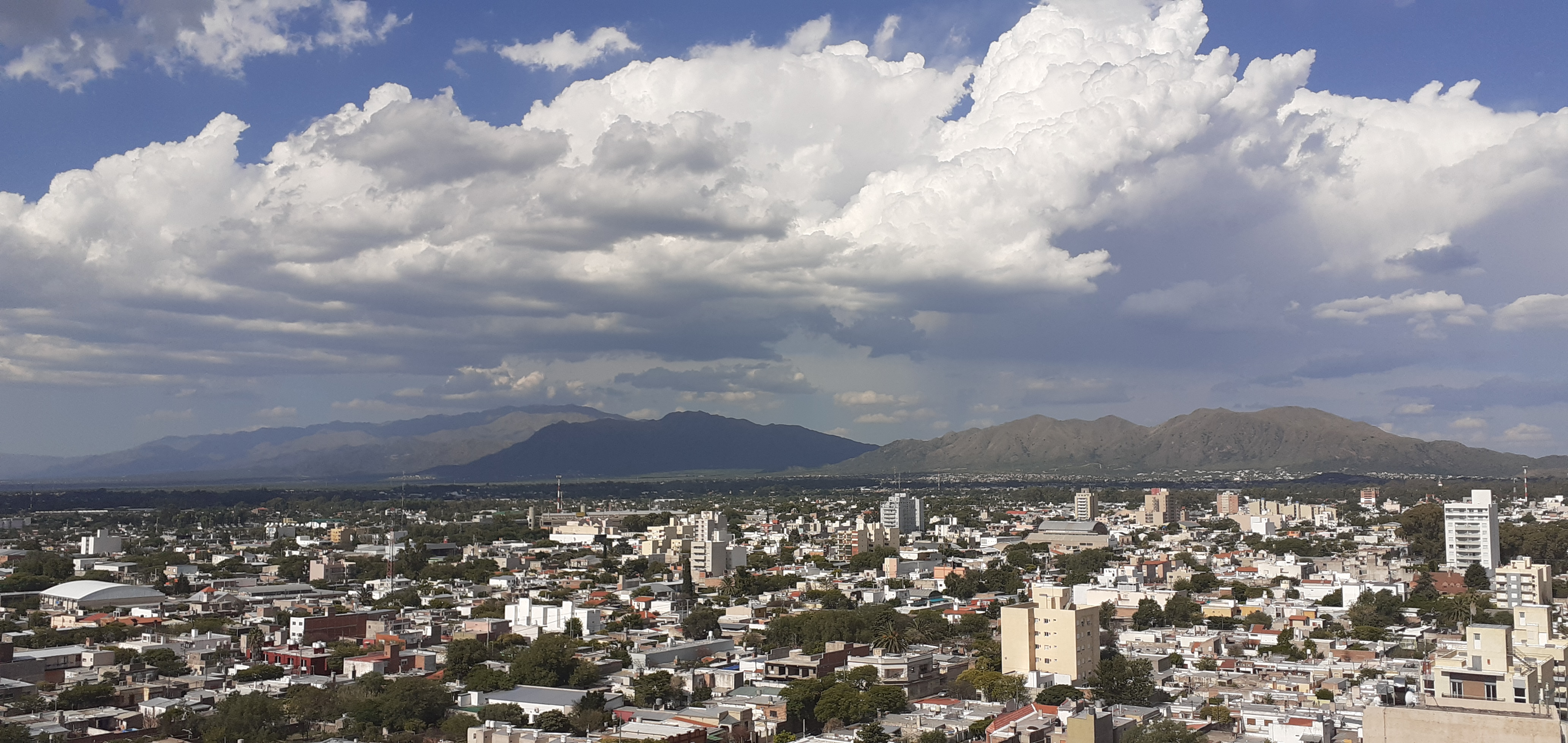
- Skyline

- Flag

- Location of San Luis in Argentina
- Coordinates: 33°18′S 66°20′W
- Country: Argentina
- Province: San Luis
- Department: Juan Martín de Pueyrredón
- Founded: August 25, 1594

Government
  - Intendant: Gastón Hissa (Avanzar San Luis)
- Elevation: 709 m (2,326 ft)

Population (2010 census)
  - Total: 169,947
- Demonym: puntano/a
- Time zone: UTC−3 (ART)
- CPA base: D5700
- Dialing code: +54 0266

San Luis (Spanish pronunciation: [ˈsan ˈlwis]) is the capital city of San Luis Province in the Cuyo region of Argentina. It is also the seat of the Juan Martín de Pueyrredón Department.

== City information ==
Points of interest in the city include the Park of the Nations, the neoclassical cathedral, a number of museums, including the Dora Ochoa De Masramón Provincial Museum, and examples of colonial architecture. A number of landmarks honour the Argentine War of Independence, as well. Independence Park features an equestrian monument to General José de San Martín, liberator of Argentina, Chile and Peru. Nearby Pringles Plaza honours Colonel Juan Pascual Pringles, one of San Martín's chief adjutants and, briefly, Governor of San Luis Province.

Fishing in the nearby Lake Potrero de los Funes, and other locations, is also popular. The Sierra de las Quijadas National Park is located 122 km (76 mi) from the city.

=== Solar Power ===
Located just outside the city is the Solar power park Caldenes del Oeste.

== Transport ==
National Route 7 connects San Luis to Mendoza, 255 km (158 mi) to the west, and Buenos Aires, 791 km (492 mi) to the east. San Luis Airport is located less than 3.2 km (2 miles) north of the city centre, and has regular flights to Buenos Aires.

== History ==
San Luis was founded on August 25, 1594, by Luis Jufré de Loaysa y Meneses. The settlement was later abandoned, and was reestablished in 1632 by Martín García Oñez de Loyola as San Luis de Loyola Nueva Medina de Río Seco.

By the end of the 19th century, San Luis had 7,000 inhabitants, and in 1882 the Argentine Great Western Railway reached the city on its way to Chile. The following year, work began on the cathedral. The Governor's Executive Building, designed in French renaissance architecture, was completed in 1911. The city's population reached 40,000 in 1960, and grew rapidly afterwards, when light industry and growing numbers of retirees began to migrate to the area; at the 2001 census [INDEC], its population was 153,322.

Because the city is located at the part of the Sierras Grandes known as Punta de los Venados (Deer Point), the inhabitants of the city are called puntanos.

== Geography ==
San Luis lies at the foot of the Sierras Grandes, along the northern bank of the Chorrillos River, and is set on a dry pampas plateau, around 730 m (2,400 ft) above sea level.

=== Climate ===
San Luis has a humid subtropical climate (Cwa, according to the Köppen climate classification) and it closely borders a semi-arid climate (BSk). Summers are hot and humid, and winters are cool and dry, with temperatures falling below 0 °C (32.0 °F) sometimes and snowfalls can occur occasionally. The hottest month, January, has an average temperature of 24.0 °C (75.2 °F), and the coldest month, July, has an average of 8.9 °C (48.0 °F). The annual average temperature is 17.4 °C (63.3 °F).

Climate data for San Luis (Brigadier Mayor César Raúl Ojeda Airport) 1991–2020, extremes 1901-present (Note: The record highs and lows are based on the Secretaría de Minería link for the period 1901–1960, while the Servicio Meteorológico Nacional source provides record highs from 1961-present.)
Month	Jan	Feb	Mar	Apr	May	Jun	Jul	Aug	Sep	Oct	Nov	Dec	Year
Record high °C (°F)	42.0 (107.6)	40.7 (105.3)	38.5 (101.3)	34.7 (94.5)	32.4 (90.3)	30.1 (86.2)	32.2 (90.0)	34.6 (94.3)	37.6 (99.7)	40.0 (104.0)	41.1 (106.0)	42.3 (108.1)	42.3 (108.1)
Mean daily maximum °C (°F)	31.6 (88.9)	30.0 (86.0)	27.6 (81.7)	23.3 (73.9)	19.6 (67.3)	17.1 (62.8)	16.7 (62.1)	19.5 (67.1)	22.4 (72.3)	25.6 (78.1)	28.5 (83.3)	30.8 (87.4)	24.4 (75.9)
Daily mean °C (°F)	24.8 (76.6)	23.2 (73.8)	21.1 (70.0)	16.9 (62.4)	13.2 (55.8)	10.3 (50.5)	9.6 (49.3)	12.2 (54.0)	15.3 (59.5)	18.9 (66.0)	21.8 (71.2)	24.0 (75.2)	17.6 (63.7)
Mean daily minimum °C (°F)	18.3 (64.9)	17.2 (63.0)	15.5 (59.9)	11.8 (53.2)	8.3 (46.9)	5.0 (41.0)	4.0 (39.2)	6.2 (43.2)	9.1 (48.4)	12.5 (54.5)	15.1 (59.2)	17.3 (63.1)	11.7 (53.1)
Record low °C (°F)	4.1 (39.4)	3.9 (39.0)	2.0 (35.6)	−2.4 (27.7)	−6.5 (20.3)	−9.1 (15.6)	−10.5 (13.1)	−8.7 (16.3)	−4.3 (24.3)	−4.0 (24.8)	0.3 (32.5)	1.6 (34.9)	−10.5 (13.1)
Average precipitation mm (inches)	115.3 (4.54)	112.5 (4.43)	92.1 (3.63)	44.8 (1.76)	18.6 (0.73)	5.4 (0.21)	5.4 (0.21)	8.6 (0.34)	22.0 (0.87)	50.1 (1.97)	87.4 (3.44)	104.9 (4.13)	667.1 (26.26)
Average precipitation days (≥ 0.1 mm)	9.7	8.5	7.9	5.6	3.6	1.9	2.2	2.0	3.9	6.1	8.1	9.6	69.2
Average snowy days	0.0	0.0	0.0	0.0	0.1	0.1	0.5	0.3	0.1	0.0	0.0	0.0	1.1
Average relative humidity (%)	52.9	58.1	62.7	64.9	66.2	62.0	56.1	47.6	45.5	47.8	48.5	49.7	55.2
Mean monthly sunshine hours	331.7	276.9	257.3	216.0	195.3	207.0	213.9	232.5	243.0	279.0	312.0	341.0	3,105.6
Mean daily sunshine hours	10.7	9.8	8.3	7.2	6.3	6.3	6.9	7.5	8.1	9.0	10.4	11.0	8.5
Percentage possible sunshine	73	75	68	68	64	62	65	71	67	73	72	71	69
Source 1: Servicio Meteorológico Nacional
Source 2: NOAA (percent sun 1961-1990), Secretaría de Minería (extremes 1901-1960)

== Gallery ==
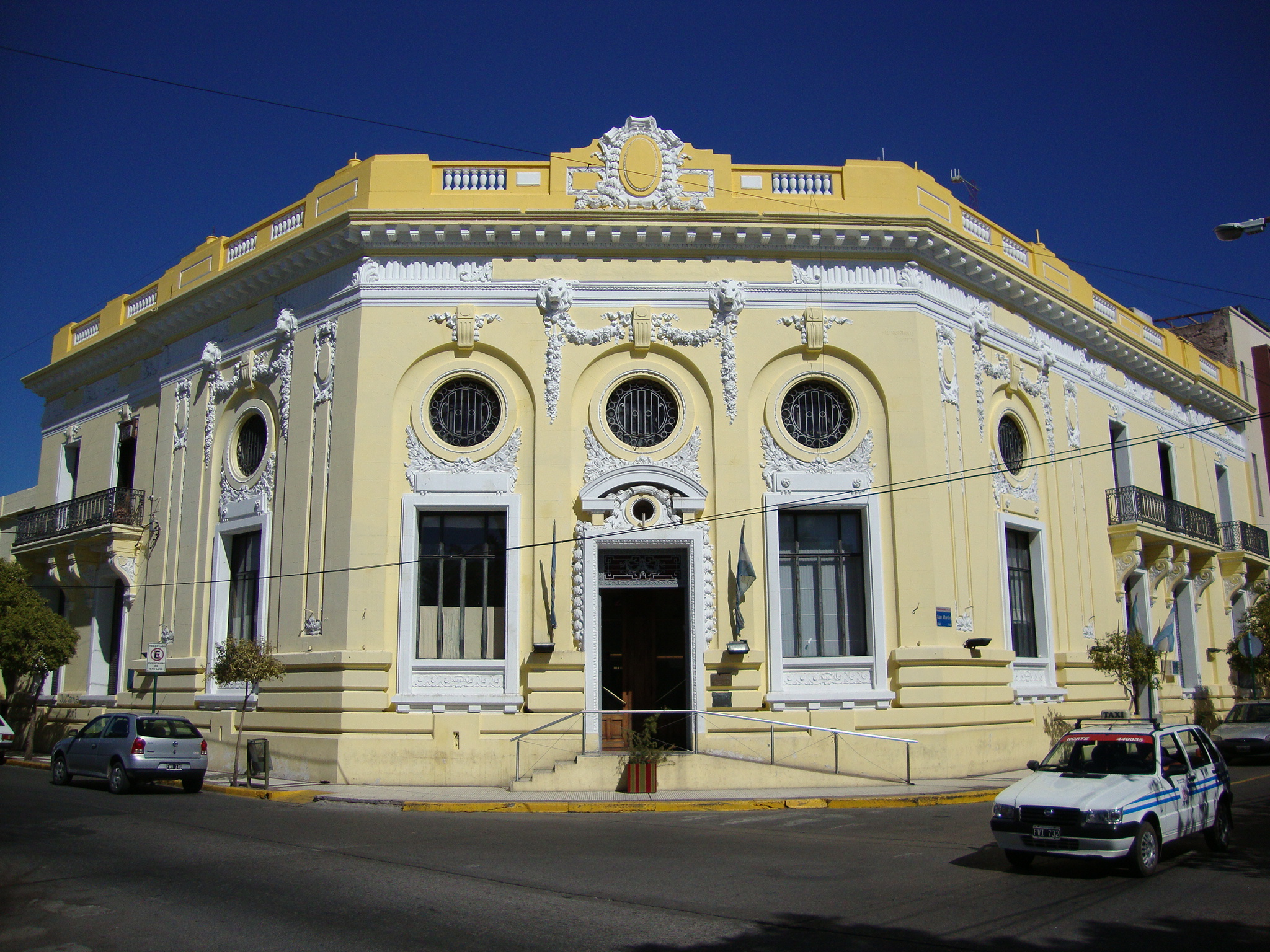
City Hall

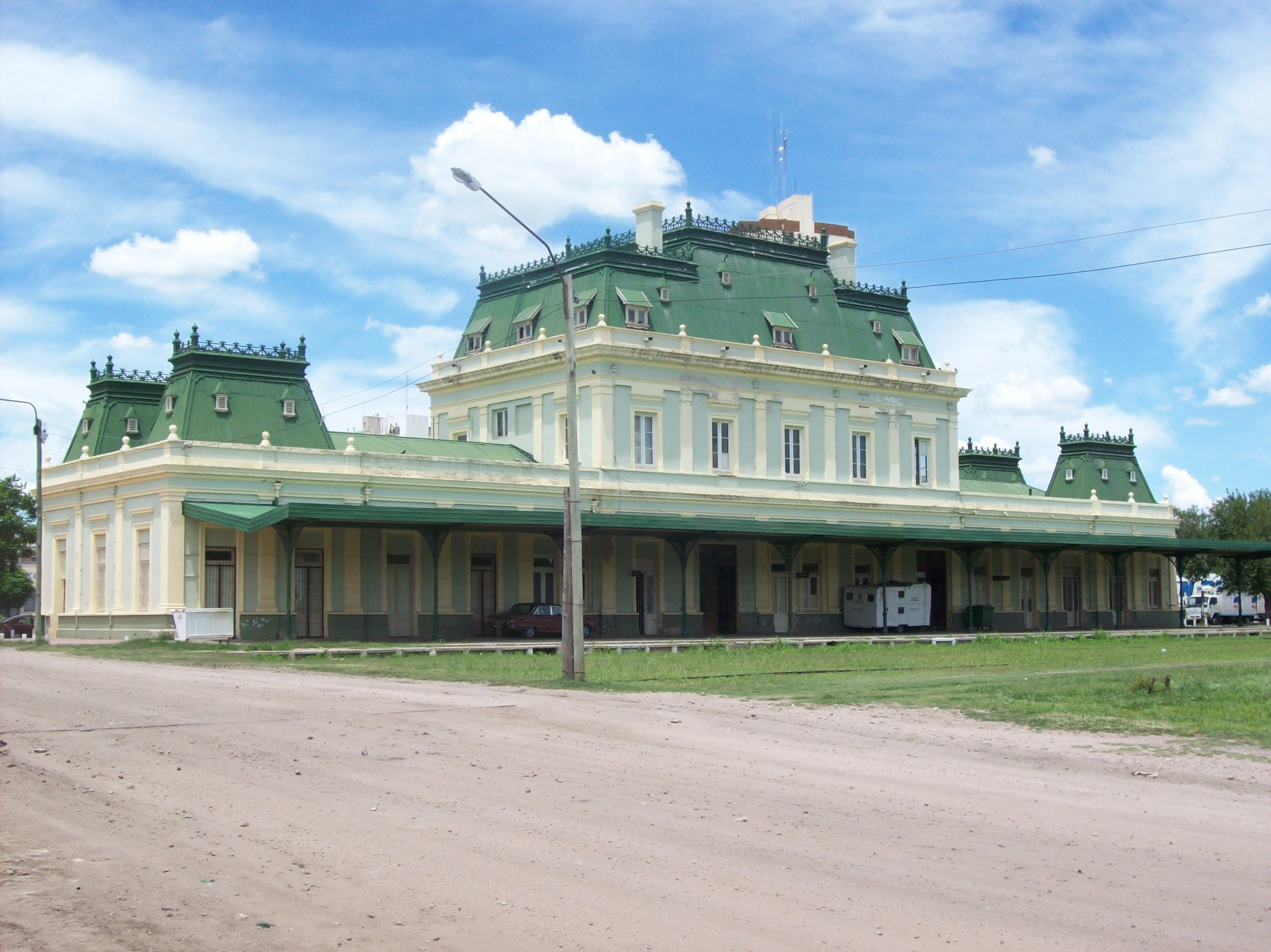
Former railway station (1907), today a cultural centre

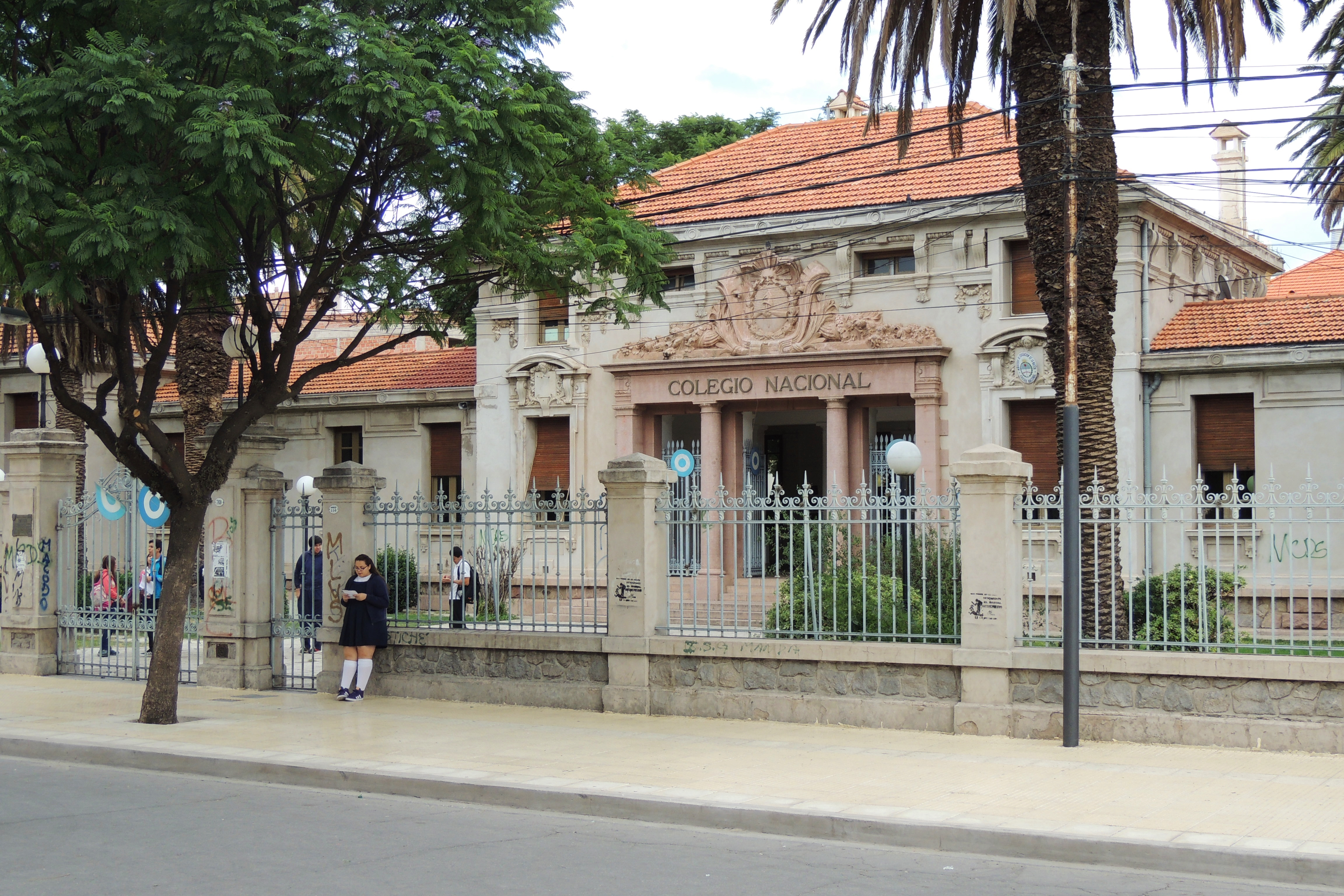
San Luis National College

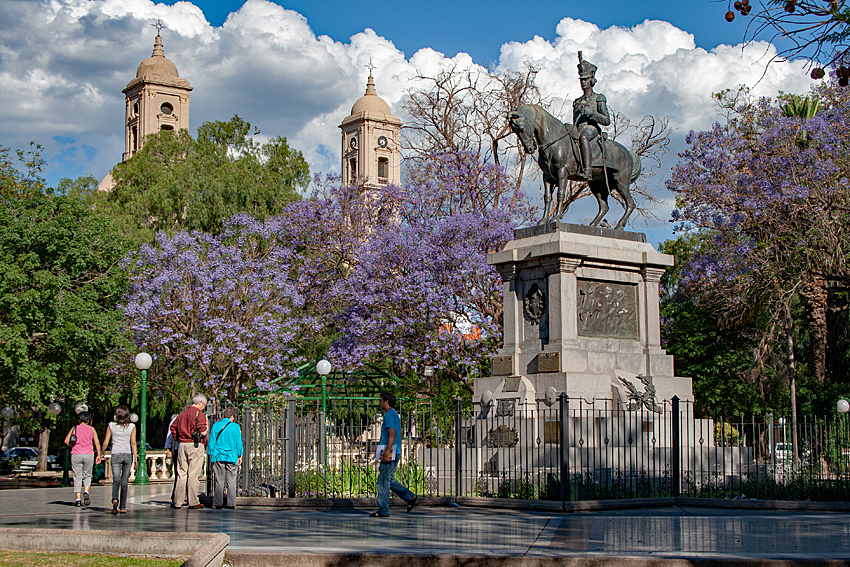
Plaza Pringles

== Notable people ==
- Justo Daract (1804–1887), politician
- Leandro Despouy (1947–2019), human rights lawyer
- Rafael Echenique (born 1980), golfer
- Matías Escudero (born 1988), association football player
- Mauro Aguirre (born 1990), footballer
- Juan Amieva (born 1988), footballer
- Norma Argentina (born 1948), actress
- Manuel Baigorria (1809–1875), military person
- Marcos Benavídez (born 1993), footballer
- Maximiliano Bustos (born 1982), footballer
- Daniel Garro (born 1990), footballer
- Emanuel Guevara (born 1989), racing cyclist
- Alfredo Lucero (born 1979), racing cyclist
- Pablo Lucero (1800-1856), military person
- Maximiliano Meza (born 1997), footballer
- Enzo Moyano (born 1989), racing cyclist
- Juan Nellar (born 1994), footballer
- Pedro Ojeda (born 1972), footballer
- Pablo Oro (born 2002), footballer
- Ezequiel Parnisari (born 1990), footballer
- Ada Italia Pastore (1906–1952), botanist
- Matías Alejandro Quiroga (born 1986), footballer
- Adolfo Rodríguez Saá (born 1947), politician; 53rd President of Argentina
- Mario Saccone (born 1970), footballer
- Miguel Ángel Zavala Ortiz (1905–1982), lawyer and diplomat
- Francis Ricardo Ferrero Fidalgo (born 1972), footballer
- Marcelo Freites (born 1998), footballer
- Juan Gilberto Funes Baldovino (1963–1992), footballer
