= Desert Campaign (1833–1834) =

1833–1834 military campaign in Argentina

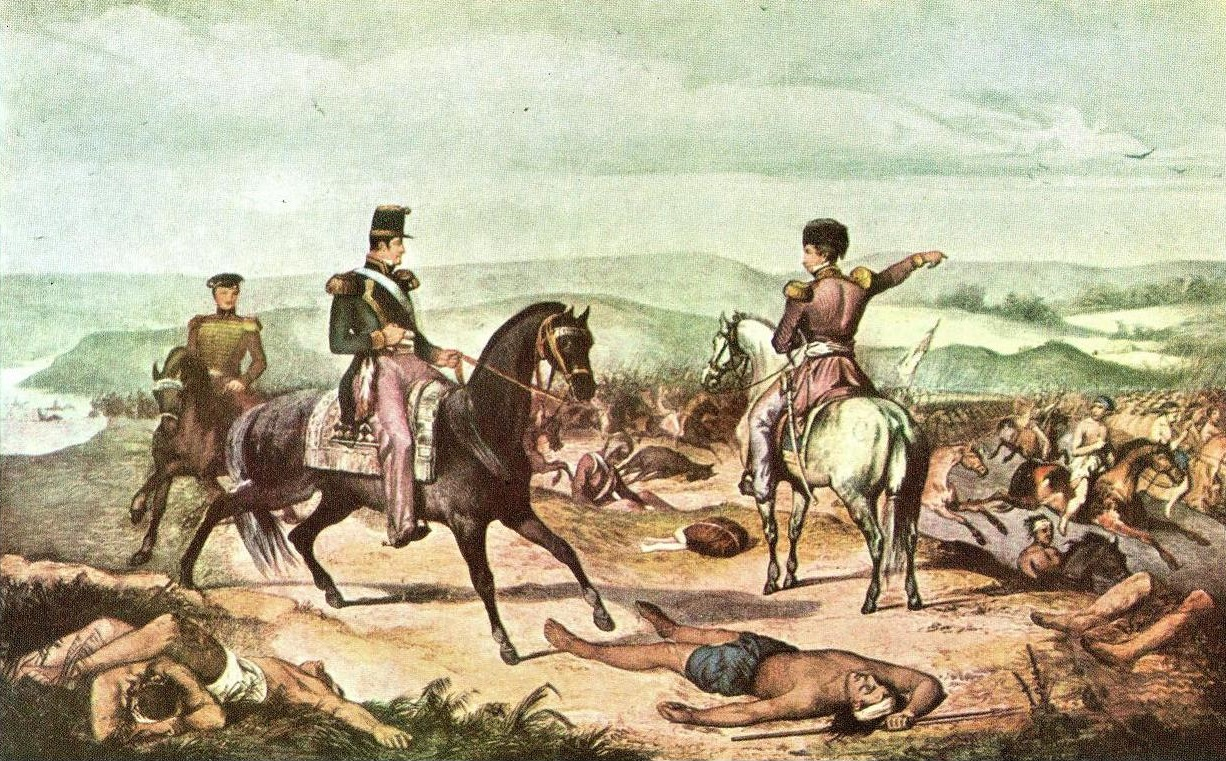
- Portrait of Juan Manuel de Rosas during the campaign
- Location: Argentine Pampas
- Planned by: Juan Manuel de Rosas
- Objective: End malones and aid in territorial expansion
- Date: 1833–1834
- Executed by: Juan Manuel de Rosas, Facundo Quiroga, Félix Aldao, Ruiz Huidobro
- Outcome: Argentine victory
- Casualties: 3,200 aboriginal people

The Desert Campaign (1833–1834) was a military campaign in Argentina led by Juan Manuel de Rosas against the indigenous people of the southern Pampas and northern Patagonia. The campaign was later followed by the Conquest of the Desert, which took place in the 1870s and 1880s.

== Context ==
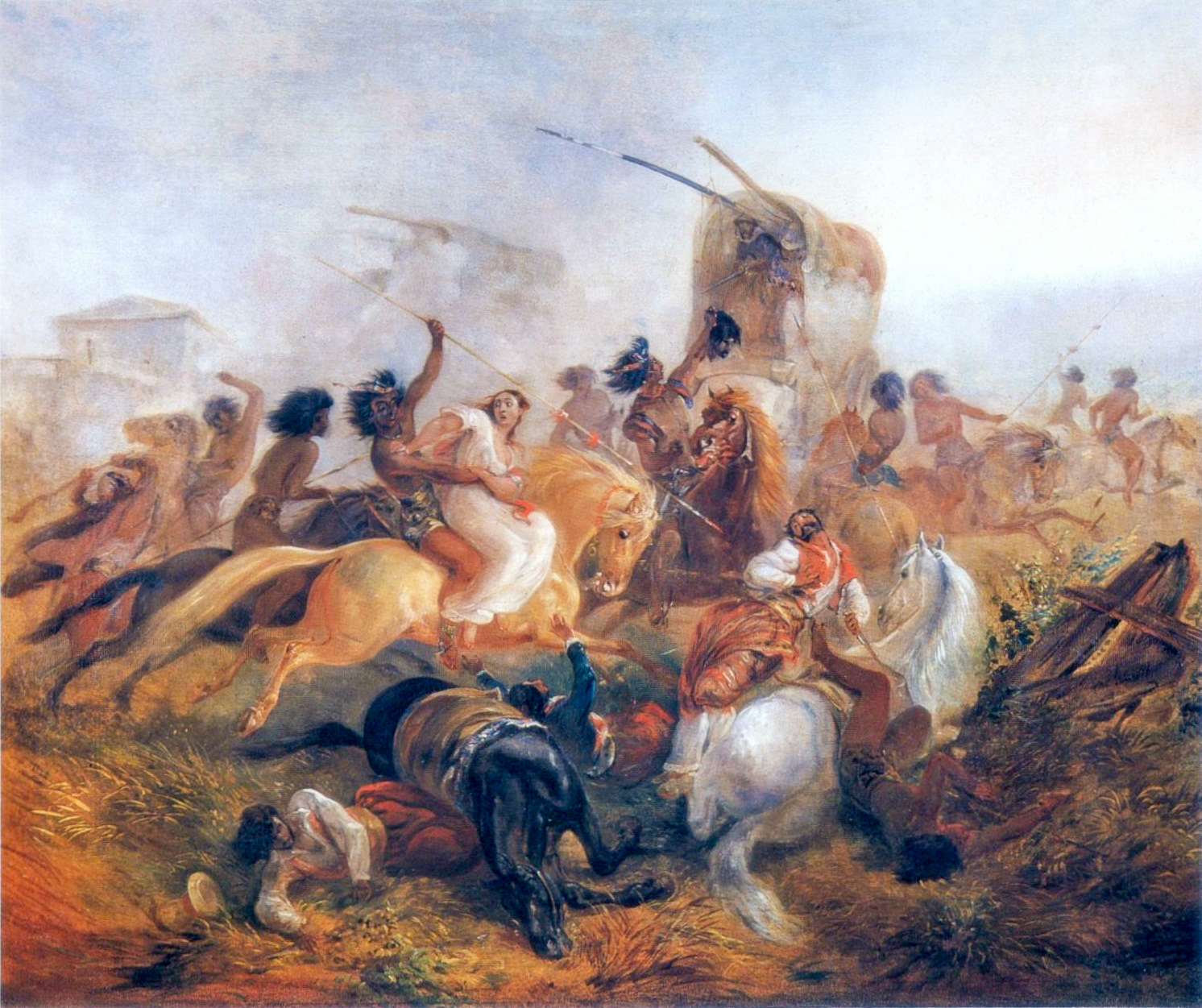
Indians attacking Argentine soldiers (gauchos from the militia)

Juan Manuel de Rosas's first term as governor of Buenos Aires ended in 1832. He had defeated the Unitarian League of Argentina. With a lull in the Argentine Civil Wars, Rosas's focus shifted to securing the frontier from the indigenous population. Juan Ramón Balcarce, who succeeded Rosas as governor, allowed him to embark on the military campaign, despite receiving proposals to deny Rosas authorization for it.

== Campaign ==
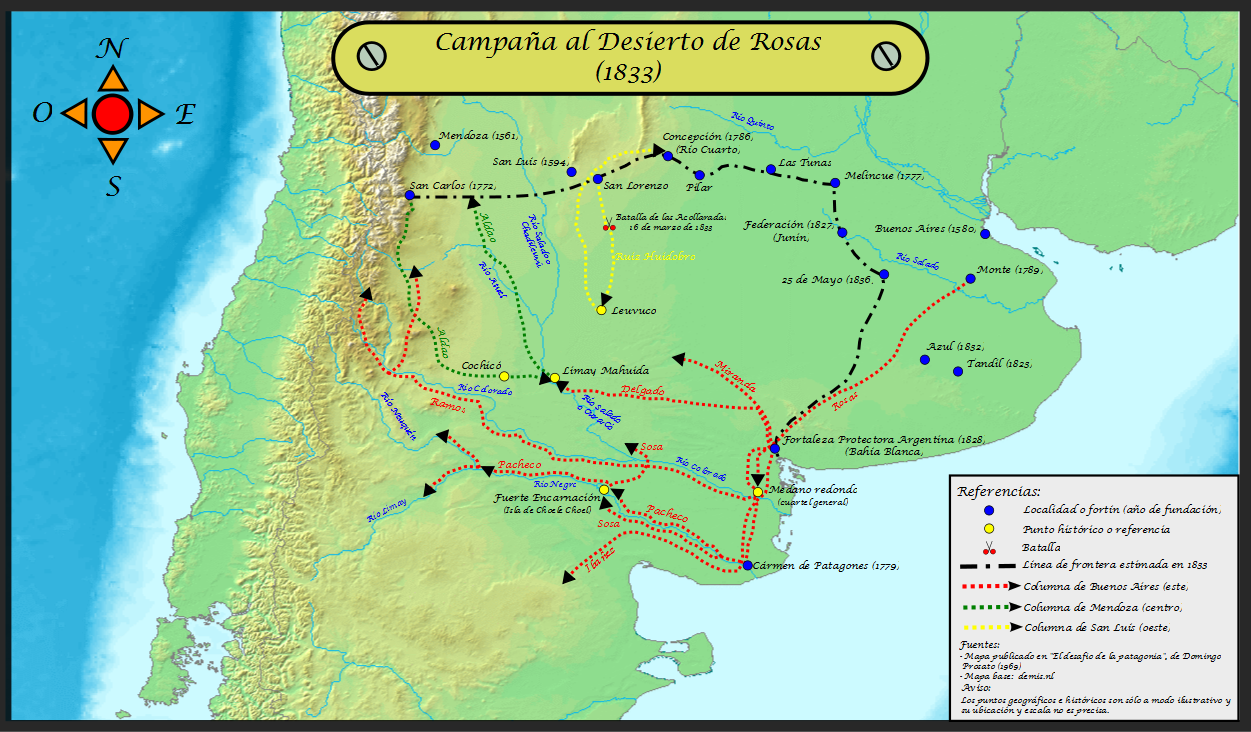
Map of Campaign Operations

Harsh terrain played a significant factor in the military campaign, as there were no European settlements on the route Rosas's army travelled, and his force had to transport all of its provisions from Buenos Aires. Because of the remoteness of the theatre, messages had to be relayed between multiple couriers back to the city of Buenos Aires. Additionally, Rosas needed a substantial number of horses, which were difficult to obtain due to the ongoing Argentine Civil Wars.

The campaign spanned from the Atlantic Ocean to the Andes, and had several sections of attack. Félix Aldao from Mendoza Province attacked the Mapuche in the south of the province. Ruiz Huidobro, under the command of Facundo Quiroga, faced the Ranqueles in San Luis and Córdoba. Rosas led the section in the Buenos Aires province. Although Rosas organized the overall campaign, the primary commander in the field was Quiroga. It was expected Chile would contribute additional military support; however, the nation was unable to do so, due to a mutiny against and assassination attempts on Diego Portales. Rosas's command left Buenos Aires on March 22, 1833.

Rosas divided the indigenous populations into three groups: friends, allies, and enemies. "Friends" were allowed to settle within the territories of the Buenos Aires province, and even on Rosas's farm. "Allies" were allowed to retain their own territories, and remained independent. Rosas provided both of these groups with cattle and other goods. He personally interviewed the caciques, learning the Puelche language, and would later compile La gramática y diccionario de la lengua Pampa ("Grammar and Dictionary of the Pampa Language").

The "enemies" group, which was composed of Ranquel and Mapuche, and had refused to negotiate with the Spanish colonial administration as well as with the Argentine Confederation, plundered rural villages and property in mounted raids known as malones. The Ranquels were led by the famous warrior Yanquetruz, skilled in hit and run tactics.

The column of Félix Aldao made some advances on the south of Mendoza Province, eventually reaching Limay Mahuida, in what is now La Pampa Province. Aldao beat Yanquetruz in the battle of Arroyo del Rosario, on 1 April 1833; however, his troops suffered significant losses on 14 May after being ambushed in Balsa Pass, on the west bank of river Salado. Though forward reconnaissance parties led by Nazario Benavídez made visual contact with Rosas' forces near the Colorado river later in May, Aldao decided the withdrawal in August, after depleting his resources and learning that Huidobro's main column would not meet its intended target.

Ruiz Huidobro's column evolved in the same way; after inflicting a heavy defeat to Yanquetruz on 16 March 1833 in the battle of Las Acollaradas lakes, near today's Villa Huidobro, in southern Cordoba Province, and advancing deeply into Ranquel territory up to Leubucó, in today's Province of La Pampa, he was forced to retreat due to lack of coordination with Rosas forces and the capture of a supply convoy by the Ranquels.

Rosas led the military campaign against the "enemies" by building upon earlier campaigns by Martín Rodríguez and Bernardino Rivadavia. In doing so, Rosas was able to make much deeper incursions than his predecessors, and destroyed several indigenous settlements. Rosas later claimed his army had killed 3,200 indigenous people during the campaign, captured 1,200 prisoners, and rescued 1,000 captives.

== Consequences ==
Rosas's campaign resulted in a brief period of peace with indigenous communities and brought an end to the malones, until he was defeated and overthrown at the Battle of Caseros in 1852. Despite having been at war with the Argentine forces since 1821, the indigenous population led counter-attacks during the Battle of Caseros. They continued to lose control of their territories, however, and gradually retreated to the south. The final defeat of the indigenous peoples came during the Conquest of the Desert, led by Julio Argentino Roca.

== Bibliography ==
- Galasso, Norberto (2011). Historia de la Argentina, vol. I (in Spanish). Buenos Aires: Colihue. ISBN 978-9-5056-3478-1.
- Gálvez, Manuel (2007). Vida de Juan Manuel de Rosas (in Spanish). Buenos Aires: Claridad. ISBN 978-9-5062-0208-8.
