= Yanquetruz =

Ranquel warrior (died 1838)

- Born: Chile
- Died: 1838; Argentina
- Occupation: Warrior
- Known for: Desert War

Yanquetruz (or Llanquetruz) (died 1838) was a famous Ranquel warrior who fought the Europeans in the pampas of what is now Argentina in the early nineteenth century.

== Early years ==
Yanquetruz's family had ruled over the region from the cordillera to the Atlantic from around 1680 to 1856, but his authority was confined to the Ranqueles. The Ranquel people, a Mapuche tribe, were led by a chief named Máscara Verde (Green Mask) in 1812. Yanquetruz came to these people from Chile in 1818. He had a reputation as a great warrior, and taught them techniques of war, making the Ranquel warriors known throughout the pampas. The men of fighting age were organized into bands of between ten and thirty people whose leader obeyed the command of the Ranquel chief. When Máscara Verde died, Yanquetruz was elected to take his place.

His first major assault was made on the settlers in Salta Province, helped by Chilean allies under a leader named Carreras. The Indian attacks were ferocious, and they gained considerable booty. In August 1831 Yanquetruz laid siege to Villa Concepción (now Río Cuarto, Córdoba), apparently in a preemptive strike since he had heard that a large army was preparing to attack his people. During the civil war in 1831 there were rumors that Yanquetruz was assisting the Unitiarian side, and this may have been part of the motive for the campaign against the Indians launched soon after by Juan Manuel de Rosas. The main reason was the Ranquels' desire to remain independent.

== Desert War ==
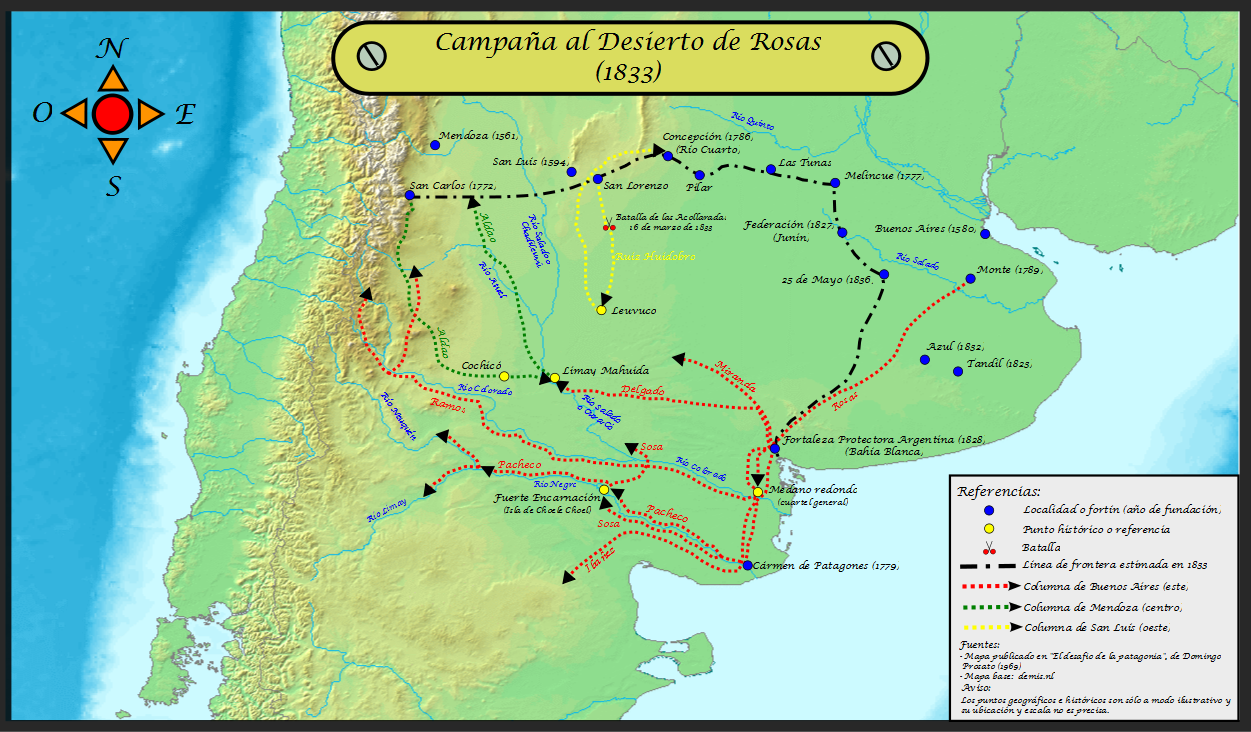
Map of the 1833 desert campaign

In 1833 Rosas initiated the Desert Campaign (1833–34), an expedition against the desert Indians. The columns led by José Félix Aldao from Mendoza Province and Ruiz Huidobro from San Luis Province were charged with exterminating the Ranquels. Ruiz Huidobro's column had 1,000 men from the Division of the Andes and the Córdoba and La Rioja provincial forces. He advanced at the start of March from the San Lorenzo fort towards the Quinto River in San Luis Province, intending to surprise the Ranquels at their settlement of Leubucó. However, the Indians had been forewarned.

On 16 March 1833 the troops under Huidobro clashed with the Ranquels at a location called Las Acollaradas. (Note: Las Acollaradas is so named because it is a place where two lagoons are joined) It was a fight with swords, spears and knives because rain prevented the use of firearms. The result was inconclusive, and the Indians disappeared into the pampas. The Division continued its march to Leubucó, 25 leagues from the Trapal lagoon, which Yanquetruz had abandoned. Huidobro suspected that Francisco Reinafé, chief of the troops from Córdoba, had been the one who warned Yanquetruz of the advance. He had Reinafé relieved of his command. Yanquetruz's men harassed the Argentine troops in a form of guerrilla warfare, disrupting their supplies and making it hard for them to get water. Huidobro was forced to retreat from the desert in disarray.

Nazario Benavídez and Martín Yanzón, both later to be provincial governors, were on the staff of the second Auxiliary regiment of the Andes commanded by Aldao. This column gained a partial victory over chief Yanquetruz two weeks after the Las Acollaradas action. The regiment participated in fierce fighting on 31 March and 1 April 1833 in which the Spanish prevailed but suffered considerable losses. Rosas was furious at the damage that Yanquetruz had inflicted on his forces. In 1834 Yanquetruz returned to invade San Luis Province. This was his last raid.

== Legend ==
Yanquetruz died in 1838 and was succeeded by Painé Guor, who was later captured and made a prisoner of Rosas. Yanquetruz became a legend, the most famous chief in the Pampas after Calfucurá. One of the soldiers who fought Yanquetruz said it would be difficult to find anywhere in America a more prompt, intelligent and insightful approach than the predatory raids of these Indians, and at the same time more calm, brave and wise in making a stand against much better armed adversaries, always thinking quickly despite the noise and confusion.

Colonel Manuel Baigorria, a young officer, left the army and joined Yanquetruz. He became a close friend of the leader, and Yanquetruz named his eldest son Baigorrita (little Baigorria). Another son, José Maria Bulnes Yanquetruz, born in 1831, became a famous warrior in his own right.
