= Ranquel =

Indigenous people of Argentina

Ranquel Rankülche
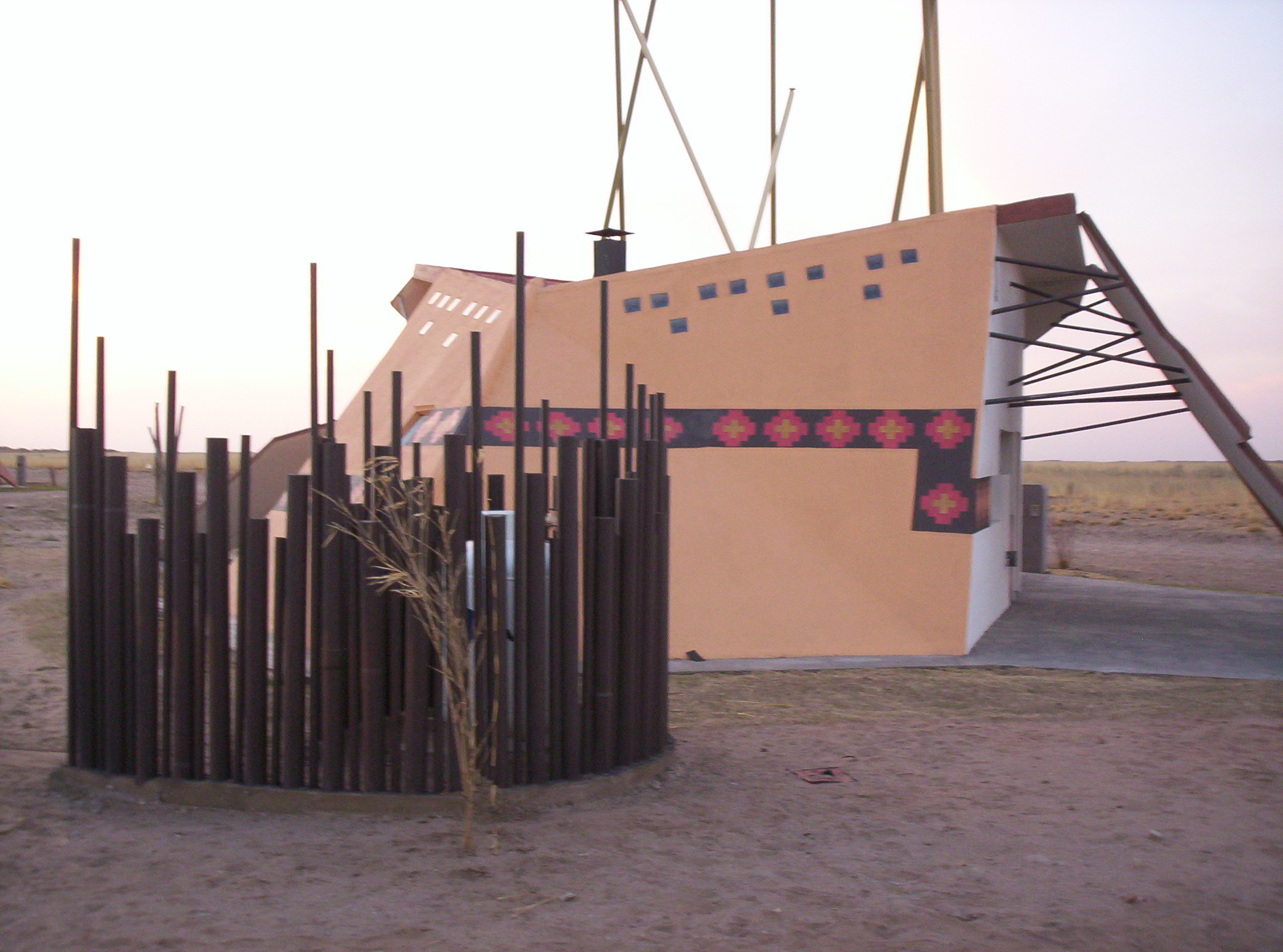
- A Ranquel home

Regions with significant populations
- Argentina (La Pampa): 14,860 (2010)

Languages
- Ranquel variety of Mapuche

Religion
- traditional tribal religion

The Ranquel or Rankülche are an Indigenous tribe from the northern part of La Pampa Province, Argentina, in South America. With Puelche, Pehuenche and also Patagones from the Günün-a-Küna group origins, they were conquered by and assimilated into the Mapuche.

== Name ==
The name Ranquel is the Spanish name for their own name of Rankülche: rankül -cane-, che -man, people- in Mapudungun; that is to say "cane-people"

== History ==
In the late 18th and early 19th centuries, the Ranquel controlled two chiefdoms in Argentina. Between 1775-1790 a group of Pehuenche advanced from the side of the Andes mountains east to the territory they called Mamül Mapu (mamül: kindling, woods; mapu: land, territory) as it was covered by dense woods of Prosopis caldenia, Prosopis nigra, and Geoffroea decorticans. They settled along the Cuarto and Colorado rivers, from the south of today's Argentine provinces of San Luis, Córdoba, to the south of La Pampa.

They were hunters, nomads and during a good part of the 19th century they had an alliance with the Tehuelche people, with whom they traveled east into the western part of today's Buenos Aires Province and southern end of Córdoba Province, and also to Mendoza, San Luis and Santa Fe. In 1833 Juan Manuel de Rosas led the Desert Campaign (1833–34), in which he attempted to eliminate the Ranquel. Their leader at that time was Yanquetruz, and they put up a skilled defense, making good use of the desert terrain. Yanquetruz was succeeded around 1834 by Painé Guor. Their last chief was Pincén, who was confined to the prison at Martín García island (1880).

They allied themselves with the forces of Felipe Varela during the rebellion against the Paraguayan War and the Central Government in Buenos Aires. After Pincén's capture, the Ranquels were further reduced in population during the Conquest of the Desert, with their lands being occupied by the army. A reservation, the Colonia Emilio Mitre, was established for them in today's La Pampa province, where their descendants lived today.

== Recent developments ==
On 14 August 2007 the government of San Luis province returned 2,500 ha (6,178 acres) to the Ranquel people, including two small lakes, about 124 km (77 mi) south of the town of Fraga.
