= 2023 Argentina network television schedule =

The 2023 network television schedule for the seven major commercial broadcast networks in Argentina covers from January to December 2023. The schedule is followed by a list per network of returning series, new series, and series canceled after the 2022 television season.

Telefe was the first to announce its summer schedule on 2 November 2022, followed by Net TV on 22 November, El Trece on 7 December, América on 29 December, and Televisión Pública on 2 January 2023. El Nueve and Bravo TV did not publicly announce their schedules.

Local schedules may differ, as affiliates have the option to pre-empt or delay network programs. Such scheduling may be limited to preemptions caused by local or national breaking news and any major sports events scheduled to air in a weekday timeslot. Stations may air shows at other times at their preference and/or replace the network's news programming with local newscasts.

Bravo TV is not included on Saturdays and Sundays since the network's schedules feature reruns only.

== Legend ==
- Light blue indicates the network is off the air.
- Gray indicates encore programming.
- Gold indicates news/public affairs programming.
- Light teal indicates children's programming.
- Light green indicates sporting events.
- Light purple indicates movies.
- Red indicates paid programming.

== Weekday schedule ==
- New series are highlighted in **bold**.
- Repeat airings or same-day rebroadcasts are indicated by **(R)**.
- All times are in Argentina time (UTC -3:00).

=== Early morning ===
Network		4:00 a.m.	4:30 a.m.	5:00 a.m.	5:30 a.m.	6:00 a.m.	6:30 a.m.	7:00 a.m.	7:30 a.m.
América	Summer	Intrusos (R) (2:30 a.m.)	EPA! (R)			Animérica		Buenos Días América (continued until 9:00 a.m.)	
América	Late summer	EPA! (R)		Animérica		Buenos Días América			
América	Fall	Intrusos (R) (2:30 a.m.)		Animérica		Buenos Días América			
América	Winter	A la Tarde (R)		Animérica		Buenos Días América			
América	Spring	Animérica		Reporter 910		Buenos Días América			
Net TV	Summer	El Valor de tus Joyas (1:30 a.m.) (Note: Starting at 12:30 p.m. during winter only.)	Entrometidos en la Tarde (R)				Editando Tele (R)	Y Ahora Quién Podrá Ayudarnos?	
Net TV	Fall	El Valor de tus Joyas (1:30 a.m.)	RePerfilAr (R)	Entrometidos en la Tarde (R)				Y Ahora Quién Podrá Ayudarnos?	
Net TV	Late fall	El Valor de tus Joyas (1:30 a.m.)	RePerfilAr (R)	Editando Tele (R)				Y Ahora Quién Podrá Ayudarnos?	
El Nueve		Sign-off		Informes Telenueve		Amanece		Telenueve al Amanecer (continued until 10:00 a.m.)	
Telefe	Summer	Sign-off				Nick Jr.	#TT: Tiempo y Tránsito (6:45 a.m.)	Buen Telefe (continued until 9:30 a.m.)	
Telefe	Winter	**Fuera de Joda** (2:30 a.m.)	Sign-off			Nick Jr.	#TT: Tiempo y Tránsito (6:45 a.m.)	Buen Telefe (continued until 9:30 a.m.)	
Telefe	Spring	Sign-off				Nick Jr.	#TT: Tiempo y Tránsito (6:45 a.m.)	Buen Telefe (continued until 9:30 a.m.)	
Televisión Pública	Summer	Cocineras y Cocineros Argentinos (R) (3:00 a.m.)		Documentales en TVP (4:55 a.m.)			Pampero TV	País Federal (R)	
Televisión Pública	Late summer	Desiguales (R) (3:00 a.m.)		Documentales en TVP (4:55 a.m.)			Pampero TV	País Federal (R)	
Televisión Pública	Fall	Desiguales (R) (3:00 a.m.)		Documentales en TVP (4:55 a.m.)		Pampero TV	Televisión Pública Noticias		
Televisión Pública	Winter	Desiguales (R) (3:00 a.m.)	Documentales en TVP			Pampero TV	Televisión Pública Noticias		
Televisión Pública	Spring	Documentales en TVP				Pampero TV	Televisión Pública Noticias		
El Trece		Sign-off					Tiempo del Tiempo	Arriba Argentinos (continued until completion)	

- Note: Bravo TV is not included since the network's schedule features reruns and infomercials only.

=== Late morning ===
Network		8:00 a.m.	8:30 a.m.	9:00 a.m.	9:30 a.m.	10:00 a.m.	10:30 a.m.	11:00 a.m.	11:30 a.m.
América	Summer	Buenos Días América (7:00 a.m.)		BDA Extra				EPA! (continued until 1:30 p.m.)	
América	Late summer	BDA Extra					EPA! (continued until 1:30 p.m.)		
América	Fall	BDA Extra					Desayuno Americano (continued until completion)		
Bravo TV		Bravo por Este Día		Esmeralda (R)		Primera Dama (R)		Avenida Brasil (R)	
Net TV		Modo Fontevecchia							
El Nueve		Telenueve al Amanecer (7:00 a.m.)				Qué Mañana!			
Telefe		Buen Telefe (7:00 a.m.)			A la Barbarossa			Ariel en su Salsa (11:15 a.m.) (continued until 1:00 p.m.)	
Televisión Pública	Summer	Televisión Pública Noticias			Pakapaka	Mañanas Públicas			
Televisión Pública	Fall	**Aire Nacional**		Pakapaka		Mañanas Públicas			
El Trece	Summer	Arriba Argentinos (7:00 a.m.)			Nosotros a la Mañana			Socios del Espectáculo (continued until 1:00 p.m.)	
El Trece	Mid-summer	Arriba Argentinos (7:00 a.m.)		Nosotros a la Mañana			Socios del Espectáculo (continued until 12:30 p.m.)		
El Trece	Winter	Arriba Argentinos (7:00 a.m.)		**Bien de Mañana**			Socios del Espectáculo (continued until 12:30 p.m.)		
El Trece	Spring	Arriba Argentinos (7:00 a.m.)		Mañanísima			Socios del Espectáculo (continued until 12:30 p.m.)		

=== Early afternoon ===
Network		12:00 p.m.	12:30 p.m.	1:00 p.m.	1:30 p.m.	2:00 p.m.	2:30 p.m.	3:00 p.m.	3:30 p.m.
América	Summer	EPA! (10:30 a.m.)			Intrusos				A la Tarde (3:45 p.m.) (continued until 6:00 p.m.)
América	Fall	Desayuno Americano (10:30 a.m.)		Intrusos					A la Tarde (3:45 p.m.) (continued until 6:00 p.m.)
América	Winter	Desayuno Americano (10:30 a.m.)	Intrusos				El Diario de Mariana (continued until 4:15 p.m.)		
Bravo TV		Bravo Argentina		Los Herederos del Monte (R)		Destilando Amor (R)		Enfermeras	
Net TV	Summer	La Usurpadora (R)		Toda la Vida			Gossip		**The White Slave** (continued until 5:00 p.m.)
Net TV	Late summer	La Usurpadora (R)		Toda la Vida			Gossip		
Net TV	Fall	Rubí (R)		Gossip			Toda la Vida		
Net TV	Spring	El Cuerpo del Deseo (R)		Gossip			Entrometidos en la Tarde		
El Nueve	Summer	Telenueve al Mediodía				Flechazo: Amor Oculto		El Show del Problema (continued until 5:00 p.m.)	
El Nueve	Late summer	Telenueve al Mediodía				Todas las Tardes			
El Nueve	Winter	Telenueve al Mediodía			Todas las Tardes				**Médico de Familia** (continued until 5:00 p.m.)
Telefe		Ariel en su Salsa (11:15 a.m.)		El Noticiero de la Gente			Cortá por Lozano (Note: Continued until completion from Summer through Winter.)		
Televisión Pública		Televisión Pública Noticias			Cocineras y Cocineros Argentinos				Todos Estamos Conectados (continued until 5:00 p.m.)
El Trece	Summer	Socios del Espectáculo (11:00 a.m.)		Mediodía Noticias			**Los Desconocidos de Siempre**		
El Trece	Mid-summer	Zorro (R)		Mediodía Noticias			**¿De Qué Signo Sos?**		Bienvenidos a Bordo (continued until 5:00 p.m.)
El Trece	Fall	Socios del Espectáculo (10:30 a.m.)	Zorro (R)	Mediodía Noticias			**Pasaplatos**		**¿De Qué Signo Sos?** (3:45 p.m.) (continued until 4:45 p.m.)
El Trece	Late fall	Socios del Espectáculo (10:30 a.m.)	Zorro (R)	Mediodía Noticias			**Pasaplatos**		
El Trece	Winter	Socios del Espectáculo (10:30 a.m.)	Zorro (R)	Mediodía Noticias			**Pasaplatos Famosos** (2:45 p.m.) (continued until 5:00 p.m.)		
El Trece	Spring	Socios del Espectáculo (10:30 a.m.)	Zorro (R)	Mediodía Noticias			**Pasaplatos: El Restaurante** (2:45 p.m.) (continued until 5:00 p.m.)		

=== Late afternoon ===
Network		4:00 p.m.	4:30 p.m.	5:00 p.m.	5:30 p.m.	6:00 p.m.	6:30 p.m.	7:00 p.m.	7:30 p.m.
América		A la Tarde (4:15 p.m.) (Note: Starting at 3:45 p.m. until winter.)				América Noticias			
Bravo TV		Primera Dama (R)		Las Bravas		Esmeralda (R)		Avenida Brasil (R)	
Net TV	Summer	**The White Slave**		Entrometidos en la Tarde				RePerfilAr	
Net TV	Late summer	**The White Slave**		Entrometidos en la Tarde				The Queen of Flow	
Net TV	Fall	The Queen of Flow		Entrometidos en la Tarde				**Cuna de Lobos**	
Net TV	Late fall	The Queen of Flow		Entrometidos en la Tarde				Editando Tele	
Net TV	Winter	Polseres Vermelles (R)		Entrometidos en la Tarde				Editando Tele	
Net TV	Spring	Polseres Vermelles (R)		**El Impertinente**				Editando Tele	
Net TV	Late spring	**Gloria y Escándalo**		**El Impertinente**				Editando Tele	
El Nueve	Summer	El Show del Problema (3:00 p.m.)		Todas las Tardes				Telenueve Central (continued until 8:30 p.m.)	
El Nueve	Late summer	**Médico de Familia**			El Show del Problema			Telenueve Central (continued until 8:30 p.m.)	
El Nueve	Fall	**Médico de Familia**			**Escuela de Cocina**			Telenueve Central (continued until 8:30 p.m.)	
El Nueve	Winter	**Médico de Familia** (3:30 p.m.)		**Escuela de Cocina**				Telenueve Central (continued until 8:30 p.m.)	
Telefe	Summer	Pluto TV Presenta: Espiando la Casa (4:15 p.m.)			İstanbullu Gelin		Bizim Hikaye		
Telefe	Late summer	Pluto TV Presenta: Espiando la Casa (4:15 p.m.)		**Sen Çal Kapımı** (5:15 p.m.)		İstanbullu Gelin (6:15 p.m.)		Bizim Hikaye	
Telefe	Fall	Cortá por Lozano (2:30 p.m.)	**Sen Çal Kapımı**	İstanbullu Gelin (5:15 p.m.)			Bizim Hikaye		
Telefe	Mid-fall	Cortá por Lozano (2:30 p.m.)	**Sen Çal Kapımı**	İstanbullu Gelin (5:15 p.m.)			**Kardeşlerim** (6:45 p.m.)		
Telefe	Late fall	Cortá por Lozano (2:30 p.m.)	**Sen Çal Kapımı**		İstanbullu Gelin (5:45 p.m.)		**Kardeşlerim** (6:45 p.m.)		
Telefe	Winter	Cortá por Lozano (2:30 p.m.)	**Sen Çal Kapımı**	**Alev Alev** (5:15 p.m.)			**Kardeşlerim** (6:45 p.m.)		
Telefe	Spring	**Sen Çal Kapımı** (4:15 p.m.)		**Alev Alev** (5:15 p.m.)		**Kardeşlerim** (6:15 p.m.)			
Telefe	Late spring	**Café con Aroma de Mujer**		**Sadakatsiz** (5:15 p.m.)		**Kardeşlerim** (6:15 p.m.)			
Televisión Pública	Summer	Todos Estamos Conectados (3:30 p.m.)		¿Quién Sabe Más de Argentina?		Televisión Pública Noticias		Noche de Mente	
Televisión Pública	Late summer	Todos Estamos Conectados (3:30 p.m.)		Altavoz		¿Quién Sabe Más de Argentina?		Televisión Pública Noticias	
Televisión Pública	Fall	Todos Estamos Conectados (3:30 p.m.)		Altavoz		Televisión Pública Noticias			
El Trece	Summer	Bienvenidos a Bordo		MDQ (R) (5:15 p.m.)			El Hotel de los Famosos		
El Trece	Mid-summer	Bienvenidos a Bordo		MDQ (R)	**Los Desconocidos de Siempre**		El Hotel de los Famosos		
El Trece	Fall	**¿De Qué Signo Sos?** (3:45 p.m.)	Bienvenidos a Bordo (4:45 p.m.)		**Los Desconocidos de Siempre**		Canta Conmigo Ahora		
El Trece	Late fall	**¿De Qué Signo Sos?**		Bienvenidos a Bordo	**Los Desconocidos de Siempre**		**¡Ahora Caigo!**		
El Trece	Winter	**Los Desconocidos de Siempre**		**Poco Correctos**			**¡Ahora Caigo!**		
El Trece	Late winter	**Pasaplatos Famosos** (2:45 p.m.)		**Poco Correctos**		**¡Ahora Caigo!** (6:15 p.m.)			
El Trece	Spring	**Pasaplatos: El Restaurante** (2:45 p.m.)		**Poco Correctos**		**¡Ahora Caigo!** (6:15 p.m.)			

- Note: **Mi Fortuna es Amarte** premiered on El Trece on 9 January 2023 at 5:00 p.m. and was removed from the schedule after airing for one week.
- Note: **Pasaplatos Famosos** aired on El Trece for two weeks from 22 May–2 June at 6:00 p.m.

== Weekday primetime ==
- New series are highlighted in **bold**.
- Repeat airings or same-day rebroadcasts are indicated by **(R)**.
- All times are in Argentina time (UTC -3:00).

=== Monday ===
Network		8:00 p.m.	8:30 p.m.	9:00 p.m.	9:30 p.m.	10:00 p.m.	10:30 p.m.	11:00 p.m.	11:30 p.m.
América	Summer	LAM				**Invasores de la TV**			LPA (continued until 12:30 a.m.)
América	Mid-summer	LAM				**Invasores de la TV**			Various programming
América	Late summer	LAM				**Invasores de la TV**			Modo Selfie
América	Fall	LAM				**Noche al Dente**		**Pasó en América**	
América	Late fall	LAM				**Noche al Dente**		Polémica en el Bar	
América	Winter	LAM			Bailando (9:45 p.m.)				
América	Spring	LAM				Bailando			
Bravo TV		Bravo Nius		Her Mother's Killer		Iubire şi Onoare (R)		Los Herederos del Monte (R)	
Net TV	Summer	Editando Tele		Festival de Jesús María (continued until 1:30 a.m.)					
Net TV	Mid-summer	Editando Tele		Rosario Tijeras		El Señor de los Cielos			
Net TV	Late summer	Editando Tele		Pablo Escobar: El Patrón del Mal (R)		El Señor de los Cielos			Resumen de Noticias
Net TV	Fall	Editando Tele		Pablo Escobar: El Patrón del Mal (R)		El Señor de los Cielos			RePerfilAr
Net TV	Winter	Editando Tele		**Cine Net**			El Señor de los Cielos		RePerfilAr
El Nueve	Summer	Telenueve Central (7:00 p.m.)	Bendita			La Hora Exacta		Telenueve al Cierre (11:15 p.m.)	
El Nueve	Spring	Telenueve Central (7:00 p.m.)	Bendita			**Bienvenidos a Ganar**		Telenueve al Cierre (11:15 p.m.)	
Telefe	Summer	Telefe Noticias			Gran Hermano (9:45 p.m.)				Pluto TV Presenta: Espiando la Casa (11:45 p.m.) (continued until 12:15 a.m.)
Telefe	Mid-summer	Telefe Noticias		**The Challenge Argentina: El Desafío** (9:15 p.m.)		Gran Hermano (10:15 p.m.)			Pluto TV Presenta: Espiando la Casa (11:45 p.m.) (continued until 12:15 a.m.)
Telefe	Late summer	Telefe Noticias			Pluto TV Presenta: Espiando la Casa (9:45 p.m.)	Gran Hermano (10:15 p.m.)			Pluto TV Presenta: Espiando la Casa (11:45 p.m.) (continued until 12:15 a.m.)
Telefe	Fall	Telefe Noticias			**Pantanal**		MasterChef Argentina		
Telefe	Late fall	Telefe Noticias			**Pantanal** (9:45 p.m.)			MasterChef Argentina	
Telefe	Winter	Telefe Noticias			**Sadakatsiz** (9:45 p.m.)			MasterChef Argentina	
Telefe	Late winter	Telefe Noticias			**Got Talent Argentina** (9:45 p.m.)			**Sadakatsiz**	
Telefe	Spring	Telefe Noticias			Escape Perfecto (9:45 p.m.)		Gran Hermano		DirecTV–DGO Presentan: Espiando la Casa (11:45 p.m.) (continued until 12:15 a.m.)
Televisión Pública	Summer	Desiguales		**La Previa de Festival País '23**		**Festival País '23** (continued until 3:00 a.m.)			
Televisión Pública	Late summer	Noche de Mente		Desiguales			SIC, Periodismo Textual		
Televisión Pública	Fall	Noche de Mente		Desiguales			SIC, Periodismo Textual		Universo Conurbano (R)
Televisión Pública	Late fall	Noche de Mente		Desiguales			SIC, Periodismo Textual		**Sin Filtro**
Televisión Pública	Winter	Noche de Mente		Desiguales			SIC, Periodismo Textual		Documentales en TVP
Televisión Pública	Spring	Noche de Mente		Desiguales		SIC, Periodismo Textual		**Vértigo y Pasión, Turismo Carretera: La Serie**	
El Trece	Summer	Telenoche		Los 8 Escalones (9:15 p.m.)				**Canım Annem**	
El Trece	Fall	Telenoche		Los 8 Escalones (9:15 p.m.)				Argentina, Tierra de Amor y Venganza	
El Trece	Late fall	Telenoche			Los 8 Escalones			Argentina, Tierra de Amor y Venganza	
El Trece	Spring	Telenoche			Los 8 Escalones			**Buenos Chicos**	

=== Tuesday ===
Network		8:00 p.m.	8:30 p.m.	9:00 p.m.	9:30 p.m.	10:00 p.m.	10:30 p.m.	11:00 p.m.	11:30 p.m.
América	Summer	LAM				**Invasores de la TV**			LPA (continued until 12:30 a.m.)
América	Mid-summer	LAM				**Invasores de la TV**			Various programming
América	Late summer	LAM				**Invasores de la TV**			Modo Selfie
América	Fall	LAM				**Noche al Dente**		**Pasó en América**	
América	Late fall	LAM				**Noche al Dente**		Polémica en el Bar	
América	Winter	LAM			Bailando (9:45 p.m.)				
América	Spring	LAM				Bailando			
Bravo TV		Bravo Nius		Her Mother's Killer		Iubire şi Onoare (R)		Los Herederos del Monte (R)	
Net TV	Summer	Editando Tele		Festival de Jesús María (continued until 1:30 a.m.)					
Net TV	Mid-summer	Editando Tele		Rosario Tijeras		El Señor de los Cielos			
Net TV	Late summer	Editando Tele		Pablo Escobar: El Patrón del Mal (R)		El Señor de los Cielos			Resumen de Noticias
Net TV	Fall	Editando Tele		Pablo Escobar: El Patrón del Mal (R)		El Señor de los Cielos			RePerfilAr
Net TV	Winter	Editando Tele		**Cine Net**			El Señor de los Cielos		RePerfilAr
El Nueve	Summer	Telenueve Central (7:00 p.m.)	Bendita			La Hora Exacta		Telenueve al Cierre (11:15 p.m.)	
El Nueve	Spring	Telenueve Central (7:00 p.m.)	Bendita			**Bienvenidos a Ganar**		Telenueve al Cierre (11:15 p.m.)	
Telefe	Summer	Telefe Noticias			Gran Hermano (9:45 p.m.)				Pluto TV Presenta: Espiando la Casa (11:45 p.m.) (continued until 12:15 a.m.)
Telefe	Mid-summer	Telefe Noticias		**The Challenge Argentina: El Desafío** (9:15 p.m.)		Gran Hermano (10:15 p.m.)			Pluto TV Presenta: Espiando la Casa (11:45 p.m.) (continued until 12:15 a.m.)
Telefe	Late summer	Telefe Noticias			Pluto TV Presenta: Espiando la Casa (9:45 p.m.)	Gran Hermano (10:15 p.m.)			Pluto TV Presenta: Espiando la Casa (11:45 p.m.) (continued until 12:15 a.m.)
Telefe	Fall	Telefe Noticias			**Pantanal**		MasterChef Argentina		
Telefe	Late fall	Telefe Noticias			**Pantanal** (9:45 p.m.)			MasterChef Argentina	
Telefe	Winter	Telefe Noticias			**Sadakatsiz** (9:45 p.m.)			MasterChef Argentina	
Telefe	Late winter	Telefe Noticias			**Got Talent Argentina** (9:45 p.m.)			**Sadakatsiz**	
Telefe	Spring	Telefe Noticias			Escape Perfecto (9:45 p.m.)		Gran Hermano		DirecTV–DGO Presentan: Espiando la Casa (11:45 p.m.) (continued until 12:15 a.m.)
Televisión Pública	Summer	Desiguales		**La Previa de Festival País '23**		**Festival País '23** (continued until 3:00 a.m.)			
Televisión Pública	Late summer	Noche de Mente		Desiguales			**Festival País '23**		Anfitrión
Televisión Pública	Fall	Noche de Mente		Desiguales			Documentales en TVP		Anfitrión
Televisión Pública	Spring	Noche de Mente		Desiguales		Documentales en TVP	**La Pulpera**	**Vértigo y Pasión, Turismo Carretera: La Serie**	
El Trece	Summer	Telenoche		Los 8 Escalones (9:15 p.m.)				**Canım Annem**	
El Trece	Fall	Telenoche		Los 8 Escalones (9:15 p.m.)				Argentina, Tierra de Amor y Venganza	
El Trece	Late fall	Telenoche			Los 8 Escalones			Argentina, Tierra de Amor y Venganza	
El Trece	Spring	Telenoche			Los 8 Escalones			**Buenos Chicos**	

=== Wednesday ===
Network		8:00 p.m.	8:30 p.m.	9:00 p.m.	9:30 p.m.	10:00 p.m.	10:30 p.m.	11:00 p.m.	11:30 p.m.
América	Summer	LAM				**Invasores de la TV**			LPA (continued until 12:30 a.m.)
América	Mid-summer	LAM				**Invasores de la TV**			Various programming
América	Late summer	LAM				**Invasores de la TV**			Modo Selfie
América	Fall	LAM				**Noche al Dente**		**Pasó en América**	
América	Late fall	LAM				**Noche al Dente**		Polémica en el Bar	
América	Winter	LAM			Bailando (9:45 p.m.)				
América	Spring	LAM				Bailando			
Bravo TV		Bravo Nius		Her Mother's Killer		Iubire şi Onoare (R)		Los Herederos del Monte (R)	
Net TV	Summer	Editando Tele		Festival de Jesús María (continued until 1:30 a.m.)					
Net TV	Mid-summer	Editando Tele		Rosario Tijeras		El Señor de los Cielos			
Net TV	Late summer	Editando Tele		Pablo Escobar: El Patrón del Mal (R)		El Señor de los Cielos			Resumen de Noticias
Net TV	Fall	Editando Tele		Pablo Escobar: El Patrón del Mal (R)		El Señor de los Cielos			RePerfilAr
Net TV	Winter	Editando Tele		**Cine Net**			El Señor de los Cielos		RePerfilAr
El Nueve	Summer	Telenueve Central (7:00 p.m.)	Bendita			La Hora Exacta		Telenueve al Cierre (11:15 p.m.)	
El Nueve	Spring	Telenueve Central (7:00 p.m.)	Bendita			**Bienvenidos a Ganar**		Telenueve al Cierre (11:15 p.m.)	
Telefe	Summer	Telefe Noticias			Gran Hermano (9:45 p.m.)				Pluto TV Presenta: Espiando la Casa (11:45 p.m.) (continued until 12:15 a.m.)
Telefe	Mid-summer	Telefe Noticias		**The Challenge Argentina: El Desafío** (9:15 p.m.)		Gran Hermano (10:15 p.m.)			Pluto TV Presenta: Espiando la Casa (11:45 p.m.) (continued until 12:15 a.m.)
Telefe	Late summer	Telefe Noticias			Pluto TV Presenta: Espiando la Casa (9:45 p.m.)	Gran Hermano (10:15 p.m.)			Pluto TV Presenta: Espiando la Casa (11:45 p.m.) (continued until 12:15 a.m.)
Telefe	Fall	Telefe Noticias			**Pantanal**		MasterChef Argentina		
Telefe	Late fall	Telefe Noticias			**Pantanal** (9:45 p.m.)			MasterChef Argentina	
Telefe	Winter	Telefe Noticias			**Sadakatsiz** (9:45 p.m.)			MasterChef Argentina	
Telefe	Late winter	Telefe Noticias			**Got Talent Argentina** (9:45 p.m.)			**Sadakatsiz**	
Telefe	Spring	Telefe Noticias			Escape Perfecto (9:45 p.m.)		Gran Hermano		DirecTV–DGO Presentan: Espiando la Casa (11:45 p.m.) (continued until 12:15 a.m.)
Televisión Pública	Summer	Desiguales		**La Previa de Festival País '23**		**Festival País '23** (continued until 3:00 a.m.)			
Televisión Pública	Late summer	Noche de Mente		Desiguales			**8M**		Anfitrión
Televisión Pública	Fall	Noche de Mente		Desiguales			Documentales en TVP		Anfitrión
Televisión Pública	Late fall	Noche de Mente		Desiguales			**40 Años de Democracia**		Anfitrión
Televisión Pública	Spring	Noche de Mente		Desiguales		**40 Años de Democracia**		**Vértigo y Pasión, Turismo Carretera: La Serie**	
El Trece	Summer	Telenoche		Los 8 Escalones (9:15 p.m.)				**Canım Annem**	
El Trece	Fall	Telenoche		Los 8 Escalones (9:15 p.m.)				Argentina, Tierra de Amor y Venganza	
El Trece	Late fall	Telenoche			Los 8 Escalones			Argentina, Tierra de Amor y Venganza	
El Trece	Spring	Telenoche			Los 8 Escalones			**Buenos Chicos**	

=== Thursday ===
Network		8:00 p.m.	8:30 p.m.	9:00 p.m.	9:30 p.m.	10:00 p.m.	10:30 p.m.	11:00 p.m.	11:30 p.m.
América	Summer	LAM				**Invasores de la TV**			LPA (continued until 12:30 a.m.)
América	Mid-summer	LAM				**Invasores de la TV**			Various programming
América	Late summer	LAM				**Invasores de la TV**			Modo Selfie
América	Fall	LAM				**Noche al Dente**		**Pasó en América**	
América	Late fall	LAM				**Noche al Dente**		Polémica en el Bar	
América	Winter	LAM			Bailando (9:45 p.m.)				
América	Spring	LAM				Bailando			
Bravo TV		Bravo Nius		Her Mother's Killer		Iubire şi Onoare (R)		Los Herederos del Monte (R)	
Net TV	Summer	Editando Tele		Festival de Jesús María (continued until 1:30 a.m.)					
Net TV	Mid-summer	Editando Tele		Rosario Tijeras		El Señor de los Cielos			
Net TV	Late summer	Editando Tele		Pablo Escobar: El Patrón del Mal (R)		El Señor de los Cielos			Resumen de Noticias
Net TV	Fall	Editando Tele		Pablo Escobar: El Patrón del Mal (R)		El Señor de los Cielos			RePerfilAr
Net TV	Winter	Editando Tele		**Cine Net**			El Señor de los Cielos		RePerfilAr
El Nueve	Summer	Telenueve Central (7:00 p.m.)	Bendita			La Hora Exacta		Telenueve al Cierre (11:15 p.m.)	
El Nueve	Spring	Telenueve Central (7:00 p.m.)	Bendita			**Bienvenidos a Ganar**		Telenueve al Cierre (11:15 p.m.)	
Telefe	Summer	Telefe Noticias			Gran Hermano (9:45 p.m.)				Pluto TV Presenta: Espiando la Casa (11:45 p.m.) (continued until 12:15 a.m.)
Telefe	Mid-summer	Telefe Noticias		**The Challenge Argentina: El Desafío** (9:15 p.m.)		Gran Hermano (10:15 p.m.)			Pluto TV Presenta: Espiando la Casa (11:45 p.m.) (continued until 12:15 a.m.)
Telefe	Late summer	Telefe Noticias			Pluto TV Presenta: Espiando la Casa (9:45 p.m.)	Gran Hermano (10:15 p.m.)			Pluto TV Presenta: Espiando la Casa (11:45 p.m.) (continued until 12:15 a.m.)
Telefe	Fall	Telefe Noticias			**Pantanal**		MasterChef Argentina		
Telefe	Late fall	Telefe Noticias			**Pantanal** (9:45 p.m.)			MasterChef Argentina	
Telefe	Winter	Telefe Noticias			**Sadakatsiz** (9:45 p.m.)			MasterChef Argentina	
Telefe	Late winter	Telefe Noticias			**Got Talent Argentina** (9:45 p.m.)			**Sadakatsiz**	
Telefe	Spring	Telefe Noticias			Escape Perfecto (9:45 p.m.)		Gran Hermano		DirecTV–DGO Presentan: Espiando la Casa (11:45 p.m.) (continued until 12:15 a.m.)
Televisión Pública	Summer	Desiguales		**La Previa de Festival País '23**		**Festival País '23** (continued until 3:00 a.m.)			
Televisión Pública	Late summer	Noche de Mente		Desiguales			**Festival País '23**		Anfitrión
Televisión Pública	Fall	Noche de Mente		Desiguales			Documentales en TVP		Anfitrión
Televisión Pública	Spring	Noche de Mente		Desiguales			**Los Mil Días de Allende**		Anfitrión
Televisión Pública	Late spring	Noche de Mente		Desiguales		**Madame Requin**		**Vértigo y Pasión, Turismo Carretera: La Serie**	
El Trece	Summer	Telenoche		Los 8 Escalones (9:15 p.m.)				**Canım Annem**	
El Trece	Fall	Telenoche		Los 8 Escalones (9:15 p.m.)				Argentina, Tierra de Amor y Venganza	
El Trece	Late fall	Telenoche			Los 8 Escalones			Argentina, Tierra de Amor y Venganza	
El Trece	Spring	Telenoche			Los 8 Escalones			**Buenos Chicos**	

=== Friday ===
Network		8:00 p.m.	8:30 p.m.	9:00 p.m.	9:30 p.m.	10:00 p.m.	10:30 p.m.	11:00 p.m.	11:30 p.m.
América	Summer	LAM				**Invasores de la TV**			LPA (continued until 12:30 a.m.)
América	Mid-summer	LAM				**Invasores de la TV**			Various programming
América	Late summer	LAM				**Invasores de la TV**			Modo Selfie
América	Fall	LAM				**Noche al Dente**		**Pasó en América**	
América	Late fall	LAM				**Noche al Dente**		Polémica en el Bar	
América	Winter	LAM			Bailando (9:45 p.m.)				
América	Spring	LAM				Bailando			
Bravo TV		Bravo Nius		Her Mother's Killer		Iubire şi Onoare (R)		Los Herederos del Monte (R)	
Net TV	Summer	Editando Tele		Festival de Jesús María (continued until 1:30 a.m.)					
Net TV	Mid-summer	Editando Tele		Rosario Tijeras		El Señor de los Cielos			
Net TV	Late summer	Editando Tele		Pablo Escobar: El Patrón del Mal (R)		El Señor de los Cielos			Resumen de Noticias
Net TV	Fall	Editando Tele		Pablo Escobar: El Patrón del Mal (R)		El Señor de los Cielos			RePerfilAr
Net TV	Winter	Editando Tele		**Cine Net**			El Señor de los Cielos		RePerfilAr
El Nueve	Summer	Telenueve Central (7:00 p.m.)	Bendita			La Hora Exacta		Telenueve al Cierre (11:15 p.m.)	
El Nueve	Spring	Telenueve Central (7:00 p.m.)	Bendita			**Bienvenidos a Ganar**		Telenueve al Cierre (11:15 p.m.)	
Telefe	Summer	Telefe Noticias			Gran Hermano: La Noche de los Ex (9:45 p.m.)				Pluto TV Presenta: Espiando la Casa (continued until 12:15 a.m.)
Telefe	Fall	Telefe Noticias			**Pantanal**		MasterChef Argentina		
Telefe	Late fall	Telefe Noticias			**Pantanal** (9:45 p.m.)				
Telefe	Winter	Telefe Noticias			**Sadakatsiz** (9:45 p.m.)				**Iván de Viaje**
Telefe	Spring	Telefe Noticias			Escape Perfecto (9:45 p.m.)		Gran Hermano: La Noche de los Ex		
Televisión Pública	Summer	Dos20 (R)		**La Previa de Festival País '23**		**Festival País '23** (continued until 3:00 a.m.)			
Televisión Pública	Late summer	Noche de Mente		**Festival País '23**		Encuentro en el Estudio		Dos20 (R)	
Televisión Pública	Fall	Noche de Mente		Civiles en Malvinas (R)		Encuentro en el Estudio		**Las Bellas Almas de los Verdugos**	Otra Trama (continued until 12:30 a.m.)
Televisión Pública	Late fall	Noche de Mente		Encuentro en el Estudio		**Distópica**		Otra Trama	
Televisión Pública	Winter	Noche de Mente		Conciertos en el CCK		Futuralia	Documentales en TVP	Otra Trama	
Televisión Pública	Spring	Noche de Mente		Relatoras Argentinas			Mundo Rep	Otra Trama	
Televisión Pública	Late spring	Noche de Mente		Relatoras Argentinas		Ser Esencial	Documentales en TVP	**Vértigo y Pasión, Turismo Carretera: La Serie**	
El Trece	Summer	Telenoche		Los 8 Escalones (9:15 p.m.)				**Canım Annem**	
El Trece	Fall	Telenoche		Los 8 Escalones (9:15 p.m.)				Argentina, Tierra de Amor y Venganza	
El Trece	Late fall	Telenoche			Los 8 Escalones			Argentina, Tierra de Amor y Venganza	
El Trece	Spring	Telenoche			Los 8 Escalones			**Buenos Chicos**	

=== Late night ===
Network		12:00 a.m.	12:30 a.m.	1:00 a.m.	1:30 a.m.	2:00 a.m.	2:30 a.m.	3:00 a.m.	3:30 a.m.
América	Summer	LPA (11:30 p.m.)	Modo Selfie	Pare de Sufrir			Intrusos (R)		
América	Mid-summer	Various programming	Modo Selfie	Pare de Sufrir			Intrusos (R)		
América	Late summer	Cámaras de Seguridad		Pare de Sufrir			Intrusos (R)		
América	Fall	Modo Selfie		Pare de Sufrir			Intrusos (R)		
América	Mid-fall	Comer Para Creer	Modo Selfie	Pare de Sufrir			Intrusos (R)		
América	Winter	Modo Selfie	Comer Para Creer	Pare de Sufrir			Intrusos (R)		
América	Late winter	**Noche al Dente**		Pare de Sufrir			Intrusos (R)		
Net TV	Summer	Festival de Jesús María (10:00 p.m.)			El Valor de tus Joyas (continued until 4:30 a.m.)				
Net TV	Mid-summer	Resumen de Noticias	Editando Tele (R)		El Valor de tus Joyas (continued until 4:30 a.m.)				
Net TV	Late summer	Editando Tele (R)			El Valor de tus Joyas (continued until 4:30 a.m.)				
Net TV	Fall	Gossip (R)			El Valor de tus Joyas (continued until 4:30 a.m.)				
Net TV	Winter	Editando Tele (R)	El Valor de tus Joyas (continued until 4:30 a.m.)						
Net TV	Late winter	Editando Tele (R)	Teve Compras		El Valor de tus Joyas (continued until 4:30 a.m.)				
El Nueve	Summer	Crimen y Misterio	Pare de Sufrir	Teve Compras (1:15 a.m.)		El Valor de tus Joyas (2:15 a.m.)	Telenueve al Cierre (R) (2:45 a.m.)		Sign-off
El Nueve	Fall	**Lo Mejor del 9**	Pare de Sufrir	Teve Compras (1:15 a.m.)		El Valor de tus Joyas (2:15 a.m.)	Telenueve al Cierre (R) (2:45 a.m.)		Sign-off
Telefe	Summer	Staff (12:15 a.m.)		La Hora del Milagro	El Valor de tus Joyas				Sign-off
Telefe	Fall	Staff	**Gol de Medianoche**	La Hora del Milagro	El Valor de tus Joyas				Sign-off
Telefe	Winter	Staff	Staff de Candidatos	La Hora del Milagro	El Valor de tus Joyas		**Fuera de Joda** (continued until 4:30 a.m.)		
Telefe	Spring	Staff	**Gol de Medianoche**	La Hora del Milagro	El Valor de tus Joyas		Sign-off		
Telefe	Late spring	Staff (12:15 a.m.)		La Hora del Milagro	El Valor de tus Joyas		Sign-off		
Televisión Pública	Summer	**Festival País '23** (10:00 p.m.)						Cocineras y Cocineros Argentinos (R) (continued until 4:55 a.m.)	
Televisión Pública	Late summer	Televisión Pública Noticias	Altavoz (R)		Cocineras y Cocineros Argentinos (R)				Desiguales (R) (continued until completion)
Televisión Pública	Fall	Televisión Pública Noticias		Médicos del Fin del Mundo (R)	Cocineras y Cocineros Argentinos (R)				Desiguales (R) (continued until completion)
Televisión Pública	Winter	Televisión Pública Noticias		Documentales en TVP	Cocineras y Cocineros Argentinos (R)				Desiguales (R) (continued until completion)
Televisión Pública	Spring	Televisión Pública Noticias	Anfitrión	Cocineras y Cocineros Argentinos (R)				Desiguales (R)	
El Trece	Summer	Síntesis	Cucinare	Sign-off					
El Trece	Fall	**Canım Annem**	Síntesis	Cucinare	Sign-off				
El Trece	Mid-fall	Síntesis	Cucinare	Sign-off					
El Trece	Spring	Síntesis		Cucinare	Sign-off				

- Note: Bravo TV is not included since the network's schedule features reruns and infomercials only.

== Saturday schedule ==
- New series are highlighted in **bold**.
- Repeat airings or same-day rebroadcasts are indicated by **(R)**.
- All times are in Argentina time (UTC -3:00).
- Throughout the 2023 Men's and Women's First Division, and Men's Torneo Federal A football seasons, Televisión Pública programming may be preempted in favor of the games under Fútbol ATP.

=== Early morning ===
Network		4:00 a.m.	4:30 a.m.	5:00 a.m.	5:30 a.m.	6:00 a.m.	6:30 a.m.	7:00 a.m.	7:30 a.m.
América		A la Tarde (R) (2:00 a.m.)				Teve Compras	Animérica	Pare de Sufrir	Teve Compras (continued until 9:00 a.m.)
El Nueve	Summer	Sign-off		Informes Telenueve		El Planeta Urbano		Teve Compras (continued until 9:00 a.m.)	
El Nueve	Fall	Sign-off		Informes Telenueve		Suterh con Vos		Teve Compras (continued until 9:00 a.m.)	
Telefe	Summer	Sign-off				Finde en Nick (continued until 8:30 a.m.)			
Telefe	Winter	Sign-off			Finde en Nick				
Televisión Pública	Summer	Cocineras y Cocineros Argentinos (R)		Documentales en TVP			Pampero TV	Ejército Argentino	Pakapaka
Televisión Pública	Late summer	Cine de Trasnoche (3:30 a.m.)		Documentales en TVP			Pampero TV	Ejército Argentino	Pakapaka
Televisión Pública	Fall	Documentales en TVP					Pampero TV	Ejército Argentino	Claves para un Mundo Mejor
Televisión Pública	Late fall	Cine de Trasnoche (3:30 a.m.)		Documentales en TVP		Pampero TV	Documentales en TVP	Ejército Argentino	Claves para un Mundo Mejor
Televisión Pública	Spring	Cocineras y Cocineros Argentinos (R) (3:30 a.m.)			Documentales en TVP	Pampero TV	Documentales en TVP	Ejército Argentino	Claves para un Mundo Mejor

- Note: Net TV is not included since the network's schedule features reruns and infomercials only. El Trece is not included as it does not offer any type of programming during the early morning block.

=== Late morning ===
Network		8:00 a.m.	8:30 a.m.	9:00 a.m.	9:30 a.m.	10:00 a.m.	10:30 a.m.	11:00 a.m.	11:30 a.m.
América	Summer	Teve Compras (7:30 a.m.)		Knight Rider (R)				Franquicias que Crecen	
América	Winter	Teve Compras (7:30 a.m.)		The A-Team (R)				Franquicias que Crecen	
Net TV	Summer	Hair Recovery	Como Todo (R)		Gossip (R)			Full Face TV	Toda la Vida (R) (continued until 1:00 p.m.)
Net TV	Late summer	Hair Recovery	Como Todo (R)	Personalmente	Gossip (R)			Full Face TV	Toda la Vida (R) (continued until 1:00 p.m.)
Net TV	Fall	Hair Recovery	Festival del Caldén (R)	Personalmente	Gossip (R)			Full Face TV	Toda la Vida (R) (continued until 1:00 p.m.)
Net TV	Winter	Hair Recovery	Rubí (R)			Festival del Caldén (R)		Full Face TV	Toda la Vida (R) (continued until 1:00 p.m.)
Net TV	Spring	Hair Recovery	Rubí (R)			Festival del Caldén (R)		Full Face TV	**Desafío 10 Años Menos**
El Nueve	Summer	Teve Compras (7:00 a.m.)		Claves para un Mundo Mejor		Argentina x Argentinos		Con Estilo	
El Nueve	Fall	Teve Compras (7:00 a.m.)		Prevenir	Clave Argentina (R)	La Hora del Ferrocarril		Somos Bonaerenses	
El Nueve	Late fall	Teve Compras (7:00 a.m.)		Prevenir	Argentina x Argentinos	La Hora del Ferrocarril		Somos Bonaerenses	
Telefe	Summer	Finde en Nick (6:00 a.m.)	Cine Telefe						
Telefe	Winter	Cine Telefe							
Televisión Pública	Summer	Caminos de Tiza		Madres de la Plaza	Función Federal	País Federal		Desde la Vida	
Televisión Pública	Winter	Caminos de Tiza		Madres de la Plaza	Lo Justo y lo Necesario	País Federal		Desde la Vida	
El Trece		Sign-off	Panam y Circo (8:45 a.m.)	Piñón en Familia (9:15 a.m.)	Cine a la Mañana			Plan TV	

=== Early afternoon ===
Network		12:00 p.m.	12:30 p.m.	1:00 p.m.	1:30 p.m.	2:00 p.m.	2:30 p.m.	3:00 p.m.	3:30 p.m.
América		Pasión de Sábado (continued until completion)							
Net TV	Summer	Toda la Vida (R) (11:30 a.m.)		Alma Gaucha		Various programming			
Net TV	Fall	Los Constructores		Alma Gaucha		Various programming			
Net TV	Late fall	Toda la Vida (R) (11:30 a.m.)		Alma Gaucha		Various programming			
Net TV	Spring	Editando Tele (R)		Alma Gaucha		Various programming			
El Nueve	Summer	Jineteando		Nara que Ver		La Cocina del 9 (R)			
El Nueve	Late summer	Jineteando		Nara que Ver		La Tarde del Nueve (continued until 6:00 p.m.)			
El Nueve	Fall	El Planeta Urbano		Nara que Ver		La Tarde del Nueve (continued until 6:00 p.m.)			
El Nueve	Late fall	**Argentina 100%**		Nara que Ver		La Tarde del Nueve (continued until 6:00 p.m.)			
El Nueve	Winter	**Argentina 100%**		Nara que Ver		La Cocina del 9 (R)			El Show del Problema (R) (continued until 5:00 p.m.)
Telefe		The Simpsons (R) (continued until completion)							
Televisión Pública	Summer	Los Siete Locos		Televisión Pública Noticias Internacional		Otra Trama		Documentales en TVP (continued until 5:00 p.m.)	
Televisión Pública	Late summer	Los Siete Locos		Televisión Pública Noticias Internacional		Otra Trama		Ser Esencial	Fútbol ATP (continued until 7:00 p.m.)
Televisión Pública	Fall	Los Siete Locos		Televisión Pública Noticias Internacional		En Casa Salud		Ser Esencial	Fútbol ATP (continued until 7:00 p.m.)
Televisión Pública	Late fall	Los Siete Locos		Televisión Pública Noticias Internacional		En Casa Salud		Fútbol ATP (continued until 7:00 p.m.)	
Televisión Pública	Winter	Los Siete Locos		Televisión Pública Noticias Internacional		En Casa Salud		Documentales en TVP (continued until 7:00 p.m.)	
Televisión Pública	Spring	Los Siete Locos		Televisión Pública Noticias Internacional		En Casa Salud		Fútbol ATP (continued until 6:00 p.m.)	
El Trece		Cine Trece (continued until completion)							

=== Late afternoon ===
Network		4:00 p.m.	4:30 p.m.	5:00 p.m.	5:30 p.m.	6:00 p.m.	6:30 p.m.	7:00 p.m.	7:30 p.m.
América	Summer	Pasión de Sábado (12:00 p.m.)				América Noticias			
América	Fall	Pasión de Sábado (12:00 p.m.)						América Noticias	
América	Winter	Pasión de Sábado (12:00 p.m.)				**El Debate del Bailando**			América Noticias (continued until 8:30 p.m.)
Net TV	Summer	La Usurpadora (R)				Various programming			
Net TV	Late summer	Various programming				Editando Tele (R)			
Net TV	Spring	Cine Club							
El Nueve	Summer	La Tarde del Nueve				Implacables			
El Nueve	Winter	El Show del Problema (R) (3:30 p.m.)		**Lo Mejor del 9**		Implacables			
El Nueve	Late winter	El Show del Problema (R) (3:30 p.m.)		Lina y los Amigos del Arcoíris (R)	**Lo Mejor del 9**	Implacables			
Telefe	Summer	The Simpsons (R) (12:00 p.m.)						Casados con Hijos (R) (continued until completion)	
Telefe	Fall	The Simpsons (R) (12:00 p.m.)				The Simpsons		Casados con Hijos (R) (continued until completion)	
Telefe	Winter	The Simpsons (R) (12:00 p.m.)				The Simpsons			
Telefe	Spring	The Simpsons (R) (12:00 p.m.)				Cine Telefe (continued until 8:30 p.m.)			
Televisión Pública	Summer	Documentales en TVP (3:00 p.m.)		Música por la Ciencia		La Liga de la Ciencia		Televisión Pública Noticias	
Televisión Pública	Late summer	Fútbol ATP (3:00 p.m.) (Note: Starting at 3:30 p.m. during late summer and early fall.)						Televisión Pública Noticias	
Televisión Pública	Winter	Documentales en TVP (3:00 p.m.)						Televisión Pública Noticias	
Televisión Pública	Spring	Fútbol ATP (3:00 p.m.)				La Liga de la Ciencia		Televisión Pública Noticias	
El Trece		Cine Trece (12:00 p.m.) (continued until completion)							

=== Primetime ===
Network		8:00 p.m.	8:30 p.m.	9:00 p.m.	9:30 p.m.	10:00 p.m.	10:30 p.m.	11:00 p.m.	11:30 p.m.
América	Summer	Secretos Verdaderos				Various programming			
América	Fall	Secretos Verdaderos					**Pasó en América**		
América	Winter	Secretos Verdaderos					**Pasó en América**	Modo Foodie	Chicas Guapas
América	Late winter	América Noticias (7:30 p.m.)	Secretos Verdaderos				Polémica en el Bar		
Net TV	Summer	Periodismo Puro		Editando Tele (R)		Festival de Jesús María (continued until 3:00 a.m.)			
Net TV	Mid-summer	Festival de Jesús María (R)				Periodismo Puro		Editando Tele (R) (Note: Continued until 1:00 a.m. during mid-summer and fall.)	
Net TV	Fall	Various programming				Periodismo Puro		Editando Tele (R)	
Net TV	Late fall	Festival del Caldén (R)				Periodismo Puro		Editando Tele (R)	
Net TV	Winter	**Cámara Net**		Festival del Caldén (R)		Periodismo Puro		Editando Tele (R)	
Net TV	Spring	**Entre Nos**		**Cámara Net**		Periodismo Puro		Editando Tele (R)	
El Nueve	Summer	Vivo para Vos				Puente Musical			
El Nueve	Late summer	Vivo para Vos				Clave Argentina		Crimen y Misterio	
El Nueve	Fall	Vivo para Vos				Clave Argentina		Knockout 9 (continued until 1:00 a.m.)	
El Nueve	Mid-fall	Vivo para Vos				La Divina Noche de Dante		Knockout 9 (continued until 1:00 a.m.)	
El Nueve	Spring	Vivo para Vos		**La Última Cena**				La Divina Noche de Dante	
Telefe	Summer	Casados con Hijos (R) (7:00 p.m.)							
Telefe	Mid-summer	Casados con Hijos (R) (7:00 p.m.)					Pluto TV Presenta: Espiando la Casa		
Telefe	Fall	Casados con Hijos (R) (7:00 p.m.)				Cine Telefe			
Telefe	Winter	Casados con Hijos (R) (7:00 p.m.)			Divina Comida				
Telefe	Late winter	Cine Telefe							
Telefe	Spring	Cine Telefe (6:00 p.m.)	Por el Mundo (R)			PH: Podemos Hablar			
Televisión Pública	Summer	Archivo General de la Emoción (R)		**La Previa de Festival País '23**		**Festival País '23** (continued until 3:00 a.m.)			
Televisión Pública	Late summer	Archivo General de la Emoción (R)		**Festival País '23**					Unísono, la Música va a tu Casa (continued until 12:30 a.m.)
Televisión Pública	Fall	Archivo General de la Emoción (R)		Conciertos en el CCK		**Festival País '23** (R)			Unísono, la Música va a tu Casa (continued until 12:30 a.m.)
Televisión Pública	Winter	Documentales en TVP				**Festival País '23** (R)			Unísono, la Música va a tu Casa (continued until 12:30 a.m.)
El Trece	Summer	Cine Trece (12:00 p.m.)					El Mundo del Espectáculo (continued until 12:45 a.m.)		
El Trece	Fall	Cine Trece (12:00 p.m.)				El Mundo del Espectáculo			Resto del Mundo (continued until 12:30 a.m.)
El Trece	Late fall	Cine Trece (12:00 p.m.)					El Mundo del Espectáculo (continued until 12:30 a.m.)		
El Trece	Winter	Cine Trece (12:00 p.m.)				El Mundo del Espectáculo			**El Galpón** (continued until 12:30 a.m.)
El Trece	Spring	Cine Trece (12:00 p.m.)			La Noche de Mirtha			**El Galpón**	

=== Late night ===
Network		12:00 a.m.	12:30 a.m.	1:00 a.m.	1:30 a.m.	2:00 a.m.	2:30 a.m.	3:00 a.m.	3:30 a.m.
América	Summer	Chicas Guapas	Modo Foodie	Pare de Sufrir		Pasión de Sábado (R) (continued until 6:00 a.m.)			
América	Winter	Various programming		Pare de Sufrir		Pasión de Sábado (R) (continued until 6:00 a.m.)			
América	Spring	Chicas Guapas	Modo Foodie	Pare de Sufrir		Pasión de Sábado (R) (continued until 6:00 a.m.)			
Net TV	Summer	Festival de Jesús María (10:00 p.m.)						Full Face TV (R)	Toda la Vida (R) (continued until 5:00 a.m.)
Net TV	Mid-summer	Editando Tele (R) (11:00 p.m.)		Various programming				Full Face TV (R)	Toda la Vida (R) (continued until 5:00 a.m.)
Net TV	Fall	Imagen de Moda	**La Sala**	Various programming				Full Face TV (R)	Toda la Vida (R) (continued until 5:00 a.m.)
Net TV	Spring	Imagen de Moda	**La Sala**	Teve Compras		Various programming		Full Face TV (R)	Toda la Vida (R) (continued until 5:00 a.m.)
El Nueve	Summer	Comer para Creer		Teve Compras		Argentina x Argentinos (R)		Sign-off	
El Nueve	Mid-summer	Con Estilo (R)		Teve Compras		Argentina x Argentinos (R)		Sign-off	
El Nueve	Late summer	Clave Argentina (R)		Teve Compras		Argentina x Argentinos (R)		Sign-off	
El Nueve	Fall	Knockout 9 (Note: Starts at 11:00 p.m. during fall and winter.)		Teve Compras		Argentina x Argentinos (R)		Sign-off	
Telefe	Summer	Pluto TV Presenta: Espiando la Casa				El Valor de tus Joyas		Sign-off	
Telefe	Mid-summer	Ruta del Vino: San Juan		Gravedad Zero	Teve Compras	El Valor de tus Joyas		Sign-off	
Telefe	Late summer	Pluto TV Presenta: Espiando la Casa (10:30 p.m.)		Gravedad Zero	Teve Compras	El Valor de tus Joyas		Sign-off	
Telefe	Fall	Proyecto Tierras	Teve Compras		El Valor de tus Joyas			Sign-off	
Telefe	Winter	Gran Bartender	Teve Compras		El Valor de tus Joyas			Sign-off	
Telefe	Spring	**El Ingrediente**	Teve Compras (12:45 a.m.)			El Valor de tus Joyas (2:15 a.m.)			Sign-off
Televisión Pública	Summer	**Festival País '23** (continued until 3:00 a.m.)						Cine de Trasnoche (continued until 5:00 a.m.)	
Televisión Pública	Late summer	Unísono, la Música va a tu Casa (11:30 p.m.)	El Festival del Bien Público		Filmoteca			Otra Trama (R)	
El Trece	Summer	El Mundo del Espectáculo (10:30 p.m.)	Cucinare (Note: Starting at 12:45 a.m. during Summer.)	Sign-off					
El Trece	Fall	Resto del Mundo (11:30 p.m.)	Cucinare	Sign-off					
El Trece	Late fall	El Mundo del Espectáculo (10:30 p.m.)	Cucinare	Sign-off					
El Trece	Winter	**El Galpón** (11:30 p.m.)	Cucinare	Sign-off					
El Trece	Spring	Cucinare	Sign-off						

== Sunday schedule ==
- New series are highlighted in **bold**.
- Repeat airings or same-day rebroadcasts are indicated by **(R)**.
- All times are in Argentina time (UTC -3:00).
- Throughout the 2023 Men's and Women's First Division, and Men's Torneo Federal A football seasons, Televisión Pública programming may be preempted in favor of the games under Fútbol ATP.

=== Early morning ===
Network		4:00 a.m.	4:30 a.m.	5:00 a.m.	5:30 a.m.	6:00 a.m.	6:30 a.m.	7:00 a.m.	7:30 a.m.
América		Pasión de Sábado (R) (2:00 a.m.)				Teve Compras	Animérica	Pare de Sufrir	Teve Compras
El Nueve	Summer	Sign-off		Informes Telenueve		El Planeta Urbano		Teve Compras (continued until 9:00 a.m.)	
El Nueve	Fall	Sign-off		Informes Telenueve		Clave Argentina (R)		Teve Compras (continued until 9:00 a.m.)	
El Nueve	Late fall	Sign-off		Informes Telenueve		Clave Argentina (R)	Conexión Jubilados	Teve Compras (continued until 9:00 a.m.)	
Telefe	Summer	Sign-off				Finde en Nick (continued until 8:30 a.m.)			
Telefe	Fall	Sign-off			Finde en Nick				
Televisión Pública	Summer	Cine de Trasnoche (3:00 a.m.)		Documentales en TVP			Pampero TV	Pakapaka	
Televisión Pública	Late summer	Los Siete Locos (R)		Documentales en TVP			Pampero TV	Pakapaka	
Televisión Pública	Fall	En Casa Salud (R)		Documentales en TVP		Pampero TV	Documentales en TVP	Pakapaka	
Televisión Pública	Spring	En Casa Salud (R)		País Federal (R)		Pampero TV	Documentales en TVP	Pakapaka	

- Note: Net TV is not included since the network's schedule features reruns and infomercials only. El Trece is not included as it does not offer any type of programming during the early morning block.

=== Late morning ===
Network		8:00 a.m.	8:30 a.m.	9:00 a.m.	9:30 a.m.	10:00 a.m.	10:30 a.m.	11:00 a.m.	11:30 a.m.
América	Summer	Animérica	Fitness y Belleza (8:45 a.m.)	Tecno Tendencias	Various programming	Ambiente y Medio		Dr. C	
América	Mid-summer	Animérica	Fitness y Belleza (8:45 a.m.)	Tecno Tendencias	TUC 200 Años de Historia	Animérica		Ambiente y Medio	
América	Winter	Animérica	Fitness y Belleza (8:45 a.m.)	Tecno Tendencias	TUC 200 Años de Historia	**Melody**		Ambiente y Medio	
América	Spring	Animérica	Fitness y Belleza (8:45 a.m.)	Tecno Tendencias	TUC 200 Años de Historia	ALF (R)		Ambiente y Medio	
El Nueve	Summer	Teve Compras (7:00 a.m.)		Prevenir	Conexión Jubilados	Automás	Clave Argentina (R)	Argentina x Argentinos	
El Nueve	Late summer	Teve Compras (7:00 a.m.)		Prevenir	Conexión Jubilados	Clave Argentina (R)	Automás	Argentina x Argentinos	
El Nueve	Fall	Teve Compras (7:00 a.m.)		Jineteando		Conexión Jubilados	Automás	Argentina x Argentinos	
El Nueve	Late fall	Teve Compras (7:00 a.m.)		Jineteando		**Tenés que Ir**	Automás	Argentina x Argentinos	
Telefe	Summer	Finde en Nick (6:00 a.m.)	Cine Telefe						
Telefe	Fall	Cine Telefe							La Peña de Morfi (continued until 4:30 p.m.)
Televisión Pública		El Cálamo y su Mensaje		La Santa Misa		Shalom AMIA		Carreras Argentinas (continued until 2:30 p.m.)	
El Trece	Summer	Sign-off		Piñón en Familia (9:15 a.m.)	El Garage (9:45 a.m.)		Cine a la Mañana		
El Trece	Late summer	Sign-off	Piñón en Familia	El Garage (8:45 a.m.)	Carburando				

- Note: Net TV is not included since the network's schedule features reruns and infomercials only.

=== Early afternoon ===
Network		12:00 p.m.	12:30 p.m.	1:00 p.m.	1:30 p.m.	2:00 p.m.	2:30 p.m.	3:00 p.m.	3:30 p.m.
América	Summer	The A-Team (R)						Es Domingo: Estamos a Tiempo (continued until 8:00 p.m.)	
América	Fall	ALF (R) (11:50 a.m.)				**Pasión de Domingo** (continued until 5:00 p.m.)			
América	Winter	ALF (R)						Es Domingo: Estamos a Tiempo (continued until completion)	
América	Spring	Secretos Verdaderos (R)	Polémica en el Bar (R)					**Estamos Okey** (continued until 6:00 p.m.)	
Net TV	Summer	Fiestas Argentinas		Pares de Comedia		Entrometidos en la Tarde (R)			
Net TV	Fall	Fiestas Argentinas		**Todos Podemos Viajar**		Pares de Comedia		Festival de Jesús María (R) (continued until 5:00 p.m.)	
Net TV	Winter	Fiestas Argentinas		**Todos Podemos Viajar**		Pares de Comedia		Gossip (R) (continued until 4:30 p.m.)	
Net TV	Spring	Fiestas Argentinas		**Todos Podemos Viajar**		Pares de Comedia		Cine Club (continued until 8:00 p.m.)	
El Nueve	Summer	La Cocina de los Calamaro		Clave Argentina		La Cocina del 9 (R)			
El Nueve	Mid-summer	La Cocina de los Calamaro		**Alumnitos**		La Cocina del 9 (R)			
El Nueve	Late summer	La Cocina de los Calamaro		**Alumnitos**		La Tarde del Nueve (continued until 6:00 p.m.)			
El Nueve	Fall	La Cocina de los Calamaro		Con Estilo		La Tarde del Nueve (continued until 6:00 p.m.)			
El Nueve	Winter	La Cocina de los Calamaro		Con Estilo		La Cocina del 9 (R)			El Show del Problema (R) (continued until 5:00 p.m.)
Telefe	Summer	The Simpsons (R) (continued until 7:00 p.m.)							
Telefe	Fall	La Peña de Morfi (11:30 a.m.) (continued until 4:30 p.m.)							
Televisión Pública	Summer	Carreras Argentinas (11:00 a.m.)					Cocineras y Cocineros Argentinos		
Televisión Pública	Spring	Carreras Argentinas (11:00 a.m.)					Cocineras y Cocineros Argentinos		Fútbol ATP (continued until 7:30 p.m.)
El Trece		Cine Shampoo (continued until 10:00 p.m.)							

=== Late afternoon ===
Network		4:00 p.m.	4:30 p.m.	5:00 p.m.	5:30 p.m.	6:00 p.m.	6:30 p.m.	7:00 p.m.	7:30 p.m.
América	Summer	Es Domingo: Estamos a Tiempo (3:00 p.m.)							
América	Fall	**Pasión de Domingo** (1:50 p.m.)		Es Domingo: Estamos a Tiempo					
América	Winter	Es Domingo: Estamos a Tiempo (3:00 p.m.)							
América	Late winter	Es Domingo: Estamos a Tiempo (3:00 p.m.)					**El Debate del Bailando**		
Net TV	Summer	El Señor de los Cielos (R)							
Net TV	Mid-summer	Festival de Jesús María (R)							
Net TV	Fall	Various programming						Editando Tele (R)	
Net TV	Mid-fall	Festival de Jesús María (R) (3:00 p.m.)		Entrometidos en la Tarde (R)				Festival del Caldén (R) (continued until 9:30 p.m.)	
Net TV	Winter	Gossip (R) (3:00 p.m.)	Entrometidos en la Tarde (R)				Festival del Caldén (R)		
Net TV	Spring	Cine Club (3:00 p.m.)							
El Nueve	Summer	La Tarde del Nueve				Implacables			
El Nueve	Winter	El Show del Problema (R) (3:30 p.m.)		**Lo Mejor del 9**		Implacables			
Telefe	Summer	The Simpsons (R) (12:00 p.m.)						Casados con Hijos (R) (continued until 9:00 p.m.)	
Telefe	Mid-summer	The Simpsons (R) (12:00 p.m.)						Cine Telefe (continued until 9:00 p.m.)	
Telefe	Fall	La Peña de Morfi (11:30 a.m.)	Cine Telefe (continued until 9:00 p.m.)						
Telefe	Winter	La Peña de Morfi (11:30 a.m.)	The Simpsons (R) (continued until 9:00 p.m.)						
Telefe	Late winter	La Peña de Morfi (11:30 a.m.)	María la del Barrio (R)			Cine Telefe			
Televisión Pública	Summer	Documentales en TVP			Unísono, la Música va a tu Casa		Ser Esencial	Televisión Pública Noticias	
Televisión Pública	Late summer	Fútbol ATP						Televisión Pública Noticias	
Televisión Pública	Spring	Fútbol ATP (3:30 p.m.)							Documentales en TVP
El Trece		Cine Shampoo (12:00 p.m.) (continued until 10:00 p.m.)							

=== Primetime ===
Network		8:00 p.m.	8:30 p.m.	9:00 p.m.	9:30 p.m.	10:00 p.m.	10:30 p.m.	11:00 p.m.	11:30 p.m.
América	Summer	GPS				Los Mammones (R)			
América	Late summer	GPS				Secretos Verdaderos (R)			
América	Winter	GPS						Secretos Verdaderos (R)	
América	Mid-winter	GPS			Intratables				Secretos Verdaderos (R)
América	Late winter	GPS			Intratables			**Crónicas: Pueblo Chico, Infierno Grande**	
Net TV	Summer	Periodismo Puro		Editando Tele (R)		Festival de Jesús María (continued until 3:00 a.m.)			
Net TV	Mid-summer	Various programming		**Viva el Carnaval**		Periodismo Puro		Editando Tele (R) (continued until 2:00 a.m.)	
Net TV	Late summer	Various programming		**Viva el Carnaval**		Periodismo Puro		Máxima Velocidad	
Net TV	Fall	Various programming				Periodismo Puro		Máxima Velocidad	
Net TV	Mid-fall	Festival del Caldén (R) (7:00 p.m.)				Periodismo Puro		Máxima Velocidad	
Net TV	Winter	Editando Tele (R)				Periodismo Puro		Máxima Velocidad	
Net TV	Spring	**Entre Nos**		Editando Tele (R)		Periodismo Puro		Máxima Velocidad	
El Nueve	Summer	Vivo para Vos				Algo que Contar		Crimen y Misterio	
El Nueve	Late summer	Vivo para Vos				Opinión Pública			
Telefe	Summer	Casados con Hijos (R) (7:00 p.m.)		Pasapalabra		Gran Hermano (10:15 p.m.)			
Telefe	Mid-summer	Cine Telefe (4:30 p.m.) (Note: Starting at 7:00 p.m. during Mid-summer.)		Pasapalabra		Gran Hermano (10:15 p.m.)			
Telefe	Fall	Cine Telefe (4:30 p.m.)		Pasapalabra (9:15 p.m.)			MasterChef Argentina		
Telefe	Winter	The Simpsons (R) (4:30 p.m.)		Pasapalabra (9:15 p.m.)			MasterChef Argentina		
Telefe	Late winter	Pasapalabra				Got Talent Argentina			
Televisión Pública	Summer	El Festival del Bien Público		**La Previa de Festival País '23**		**Festival País '23** (continued until 3:00 a.m.)			
Televisión Pública	Late summer	La Liga de la Ciencia		Desiguales			**Festival País '23** (continued until 12:30 a.m.)		
Televisión Pública	Fall	La Liga de la Ciencia		Desiguales			**Festival País '23**		**Zona Mixta** (continued until 12:30 a.m.)
Televisión Pública	Mid-fall	La Liga de la Ciencia		Desiguales			Documentales en TVP		**Zona Mixta** (continued until 12:30 a.m.)
Televisión Pública	Late fall	La Liga de la Ciencia		Desiguales			**40 Años de Democracia**		**Zona Mixta** (continued until 12:30 a.m.)
Televisión Pública	Spring	Televisión Pública Noticias		Desiguales			Documentales en TVP		**Zona Mixta** (continued until 12:30 a.m.)
El Trece	Summer	Cine Shampoo (12:00 p.m.)				El Mundo del Espectáculo			
El Trece	Mid-summer	Cine Shampoo (12:00 p.m.)				El Mundo del Espectáculo			Pasión por el Fútbol (11:45 p.m.) (continued until 12:30 a.m.)
El Trece	Fall	Cine Shampoo (12:00 p.m.)				Periodismo para Todos			Pasión por el Fútbol (11:45 p.m.) (continued until 12:30 a.m.)
El Trece	Late fall	Cine Shampoo (12:00 p.m.)				Periodismo para Todos		Resto del Mundo	Pasión por el Fútbol (11:45 p.m.) (continued until 12:30 a.m.)

=== Late night ===
Network		12:00 a.m.	12:30 a.m.	1:00 a.m.	1:30 a.m.	2:00 a.m.	2:30 a.m.	3:00 a.m.	3:30 a.m.
América		Modo Selfie	Drivers (12:45 a.m.)	Pare de Sufrir			LAM (R) (continued until 5:00 a.m.) (Note: Continued until 6:00 a.m. during Summer.)		
Net TV	Summer	Festival de Jesús María (10:00 p.m.)						Editando Tele (R) (continued until 6:00 a.m.)	
Net TV	Mid-summer	Editando Tele (R)				El Señor de los Cielos (R) (continued until 5:00 a.m.)			
Net TV	Winter	Editando Tele (R)		Teve Compras		El Señor de los Cielos (R) (continued until 5:00 a.m.)			
El Nueve	Summer	Clave Argentina (R)		En Estéreo	Teve Compras		Sign-off		
El Nueve	Spring	El Valor de tus Joyas	Clave Argentina (R)		Teve Compras		Sign-off		
Telefe	Summer	Pluto TV Presenta: Espiando la Casa	Código Viaje		Teve Compras	El Valor de tus Joyas			Sign-off
Telefe	Fall	Teve Compras (12:15 a.m.)			El Valor de tus Joyas (1:45 a.m.)				Sign-off
Telefe	Spring	Desafío a las Brasas	Teve Compras				El Valor de tus Joyas		
Televisión Pública	Summer	**Festival País '23** (10:00 p.m.)						Cine de Trasnoche (continued until 5:00 a.m.)	
Televisión Pública	Late summer	**Festival País '23** (10:30 p.m.)	Cine de Trasnoche (continued until 5:00 a.m.)						
Televisión Pública	Fall	**Zona Mixta** (11:30 p.m.)	Documentales en TVP	Filmoteca			Los Siete Locos (R)		La Liga de la Ciencia (R) (continued until 4:30 a.m.)
Televisión Pública	Late fall	**Zona Mixta** (11:30 p.m.)	Documentales en TVP	Filmoteca				La Liga de la Ciencia (R)	
El Trece	Summer	Cucinare	Sign-off						
El Trece	Mid-summer	Pasión por el Fútbol (11:45 p.m.)	Cucinare	Sign-off					

== By network ==
=== América ===
Returning series:

- A la Tarde
- The A-Team (reruns)
- ALF (reruns)
- Animérica
- Ambiente y Medio
- América Noticias
- América Top Ten
- Bailando (Note: Returned from 2021; previously airing within Showmatch.) (moved from El Trece)
- BDA Extra
- Buenos Días América
- Cámaras de Seguridad
- Chicas Guapas
- Comer Para Creer (Note: Moved from El Nueve during season.)
- Desayuno Americano (Note: Returned from 2017.)
- El Diario de Mariana (Note: Revived.) (moved from El Trece)
- Dr. C (Note: Moved to C5N during season.)
- Drivers
- EPA! (Note: Previously branded as Es por Ahí.)
- Es Domingo: Estamos a Tiempo
- Fitness y Belleza
- Franquicias que Crecen
- GPS
- Intratables
- Intrusos
- Knight Rider (reruns)
- LAM
- LPA
- Los Mammones (reruns)
- Modo Foodie
- Modo Selfie
- Pasión de Sábado
- Polémica en el Bar (moved from Telefe)
- Reporter 910 (shared with Radio La Red)
- Secretos Verdaderos
- Tecno Tendencias
- TUC 200 Años de Historia

New series:

- Crónicas: Pueblo Chico, Infierno Grande
- El Debate del Bailando
- Estamos Okey
- Invasores de la TV
- Melody
- Noche al Dente
- Pasión de Domingo
- Pasó en América

Not returning from 2022:

- América Noticias Mediodía
- América Top Ten
- Animales Sueltos
- Los Constructores (moved to Net TV)
- Recreo, el Programa

=== Bravo TV ===
Returning series:

- Avenida Brasil (reruns)
- Las Bravas
- Bravo Argentina
- Bravo por Este Día
- Bravo Nius
- Destilando Amor (reruns)
- Enfermeras
- Esmeralda (reruns)
- Her Mother's Killer
- Los Herederos del Monte (reruns)
- Iubire şi Onoare (reruns)
- Primera Dama (reruns)

Not returning from 2022:

- A Força do Querer

=== Net TV ===
Returning series:

- Alma Gaucha
- Los Constructores (moved from América)
- El Cuerpo del Deseo (reruns)
- Editando Tele
- Entrometidos en la Tarde
- Festival de Jesús María (moved from TVP)
- Festival del Caldén
- Fiestas Argentinas
- Full Face TV
- Gossip
- Imagen de Moda
- Máxima Velocidad
- Modo Fontevecchia
- Pablo Escobar: El Patrón del Mal (reruns) (Note: Previously aired on El Nueve in 2014.)
- Pares de Comedia
- Periodismo Puro
- Personalmente
- Polseres Vermelles (reruns)
- Primera Vuelta
- The Queen of Flow
- RePerfilAr
- Resumen de Noticias
- Rosario Tijeras
- Rubí (reruns)
- El Señor de los Cielos
- Toda la Vida
- La Usurpadora (reruns)
- Y Ahora Quién Podrá Ayudarnos?

New series:

- Cámara Net
- Cuna de Lobos
- Entre Nos
- Gloria y Escándalo
- El Impertinente
- La Sala
- Todos Podemos Viajar
- Viva el Carnaval
- The White Slave

Not returning from 2022:

- Buen Plan
- La Cocina del Mundial
- Como Todo
- Como Todo Express
- Escuela para Maridos
- La Hora de Francisco
- Império (reruns)
- Mi Gorda Bella (reruns)
- Pedro, el Escamoso (reruns)
- La Piloto
- Primera Vuelta
- ¿Qué Comen los Famosos?
- Las Rubias
- Tal Cual
- Tarde de Chicas
- Tierra Indomable

=== El Nueve ===
Returning series:

- Algo que Contar
- Argentina x Argentinos
- Automás
- Bendita
- Claves para un Mundo Mejor (Note: Moved to Televisión Pública during season.)
- La Cocina de los Calamaro
- La Cocina del 9 (reruns)
- Comer para Creer (Note: Moved to América during season.)
- Con Estilo
- Conexión Jubilados
- Clave Argentina
- Crimen y Misterio
- La Divina Noche de Dante
- En Estéreo
- Flechazo: Amor Oculto
- La Hora del Ferrocarril (moved from Crónica TV)
- La Hora Exacta
- Implacables
- Jineteando
- Knockout 9
- Lina y los Amigos del Arcoíris (reruns) (Note: Originally aired on YouTube.)
- Nara que Ver
- Opinión Pública
- El Planeta Urbano
- Prevenir
- Puente Musical
- Qué Mañana!
- Somos Bonaerenses
- El Show del Problema
- Suterh con Vos (moved from Crónica TV)
- La Tarde del Nueve
- Telenueve
  - Amanece
  - Informes Telenueve
  - Telenueve al Amanecer
  - Telenueve al Cierre
  - Telenueve al Mediodía
  - Telenueve Central
- Todas las Tardes
- Vivo para Vos

New series:

- Alumnitos
- Argentina 100%
- Bienvenidos a Ganar
- Escuela de Cocina
- La Última Cena
- Médico de Familia
- Lo Mejor del 9
- Tenés que Ir

Not returning from 2022:

- Está en tus Manos
- Moria es Moria
- Opinión Pública
- Selección Argentina, la Serie
- Selección de Noticias, Camino a Qatar
- El Sueño de tu Casa Propia
- Super Super

=== Telefe ===
Returning series:

- #TT: Tiempo y Tránsito
- A la Barbarossa
- Ariel en su Salsa
- Bizim Hikaye
- Buen Telefe
- Casados con Hijos (reruns)
- Código Viaje
- Copa Libertadores (moved from Fox Sports; shared with ESPN and Pluto TV)
- Cortá por Lozano
- Desafío a las Brasas
- Divina Comida
- Escape Perfecto
- Expedición Robinson
- Finde en Nick
- Got Talent Argentina (Note: Revived; previously as Talento Argentino.)
- Gran Bartender
- Gran Hermano
- Gravedad Zero
- İstanbullu Gelin
- Kırgın Çiçekler (reruns)
- María la del Barrio (reruns)
- MasterChef Argentina
- Nick Jr.
- El Noticiero de la Gente
- Pasapalabra
- La Peña de Morfi
- PH: Podemos Hablar
- Pluto TV Presenta: Espiando la Casa.
- Por el Mundo
- Proyecto Tierras
- Ruta del Vino
- The Simpsons
- Staff
- Staff de Candidatos
- Telefe Noticias

New series:

- Alev Alev
- Café con Aroma de Mujer
- The Challenge Argentina: El Desafío
- Fuera de Joda (shared with Twitch)
- Gol de Medianoche
- El Ingrediente
- Iván de Viaje
- Kardeşlerim
- Pantanal
- Sadakatsiz
- Sen Çal Kapımı

Not returning from 2022:

- Bir Zamanlar Çukurova
- Gênesis
- Por el Mundo Mundial
- ¿Quién es la Máscara?
- El Último Pasajero
- La Voz Argentina

=== Televisión Pública ===
Returning series:

- Altavoz
- Anfitrión
- Archivo General de la Emoción
- El Cálamo y su Mensaje
- Caminos de Tiza
- Carreras Argentinas
- Civiles en Malvinas (reruns)
- Claves para un Mundo Mejor (Note: Moved from El Nueve during season.)
- Cocineras y Cocineros Argentinos
- Conciertos en el CCK
- Desde la Vida
- Desiguales
- Documentales en TVP
- Dos20
- Ejército Argentino
- En Casa Salud
- Encuentro en el Estudio (shared with Encuentro)
- El Festival del Bien Público
- Función Federal
- Fútbol ATP
- Futuralia
- Lo Justo y lo Necesario (shared with A24)
- La Liga de la Ciencia
- Madres de la Plaza
- Mañanas Públicas
- Médicos del Fin del Mundo (reruns)
- Mundo Rep
- Música por la Ciencia
- Noche de Mente
- Otra Trama
- País Federal
- Pakapaka
- Pampero TV
- ¿Quién Sabe Más de Argentina?
- Relatoras Argentinas
- La Santa Misa
- Ser Esencial
- Shalom AMIA
- SIC, Periodismo Textual
- Los Siete Locos
- Televisión Pública Noticias
- Televisión Pública Noticias Internacional
- Todos Estamos Conectados
- Unísono, la Música va a tu Casa
- Universo Conurbano (reruns)

New series:

- 40 Años de Democracia
- 8M
- Aire Nacional
- Las Bellas Almas de los Verdugos
- Distópica
- Festival País '23
- Los Mil Días de Allende
- Madame Requin
- La Previa de Festival País '23
- La Pulpera
- Sin Filtro
- Vértigo y Pasión, Turismo Carretera: La Serie
- Zona Mixta

Not returning from 2022:

- Festival de Jesús María (moved to Net TV)
- Mundo Leo
- La Noche del Mundial
- La Tarde del Mundial

=== El Trece ===
Returning series:

- Los 8 Escalones
- Almorzando con Juana
- Argentina, Tierra de Amor y Venganza (Note: Returned from 2019.)
- Arriba Argentinos
- Bienvenidos a Bordo
- Canta Conmigo Ahora
- Carburando
- Cucinare
- El Garage
- El Hotel de los Famosos
- Mañanísima (moved from Ciudad Magazine)
- Mediodía Noticias
- La Noche de Mirtha
- Nosotros a la Mañana
- Panam y Circo
- Pasión por el Fútbol
- Periodismo para Todos
- Piñón en Familia
- Plan TV
- Resto del Mundo
- Síntesis
- Socios del Espectáculo
- Tiempo del Tiempo
- Telenoche
- Zorro (reruns)

New series:

- Los 8 Escalones Kids
- ¡Ahora Caigo!
- Bien de Mañana
- Buenos Chicos
- Canım Annem
- ¿De Qué Signo Sos?
- Los Desconocidos de Siempre
- Mi Fortuna es Amarte
- El Galpón
- Pasaplatos
- Pasaplatos: El Restaurante
- Pasaplatos Famosos
- Poco Correctos

Not returning from 2022:

- La 1-5/18
- 100 Argentinos Dicen
- Hogar Dulce Hogar
- Momento D

== Renewals and cancellations ==
=== Renewals ===
==== Telefe ====
- Copa Libertadores—Renewed through the 2026 season.
- Gran Hermano—Renewed for an eleventh season on 26 March 2023.

=== Cancellations/series endings ===
==== América ====
- Dr. C—It was announced on 24 February 2023 that the show would move to C5N since 4 March 2023.
- EPA!—Canceled on 17 March 2023.
- Invasores de la TV—Canceled on 31 March 2023.
- LPA—Canceled on 26 January 2023.

==== El Trece ====
- Bien de Mañana—Cancelled on 25 September 2023.
- Canım Annem—Cancelled on 26 April 2023.
- ¿De Qué Signo Sos?—Cancelled on 12 May 2023.
- Mi Fortuna es Amarte—Pulled from the schedule and canceled on 13 January 2023.
- Nosotros a la Mañana—It was announced on 2 August 2023 that the show would end on 11 August.

== See also ==
- Television in Argentina
- List of television stations in Argentina
