= Television in Argentina =

Television is one of the major mass media of Argentina. As of 2019, household ownership of television sets in the country is 99%, with the majority of households usually having two sets. Cable television has become the most used type of delivering, with 73.2% of households having a cable provider.

Argentine television broadcasting officially began on October 17, 1951, with the inaugural of the state-owned Canal 7. It remains as the network with the biggest national coverage, while private broadcasting networks have a big number of affiliates in different cities through all the country. Argentina also became the fourth most important country in terms of export of television formats, only surpassed by the United States, the Netherlands and the United Kingdom.

Argentina's broadcast television system includes PAL-N for analog television and ISDB-T for digital television. Half of television sets in Argentina remained with analog services in 2017, although the analogue shutdown is expected to take place before 31 March 2026.

== History ==
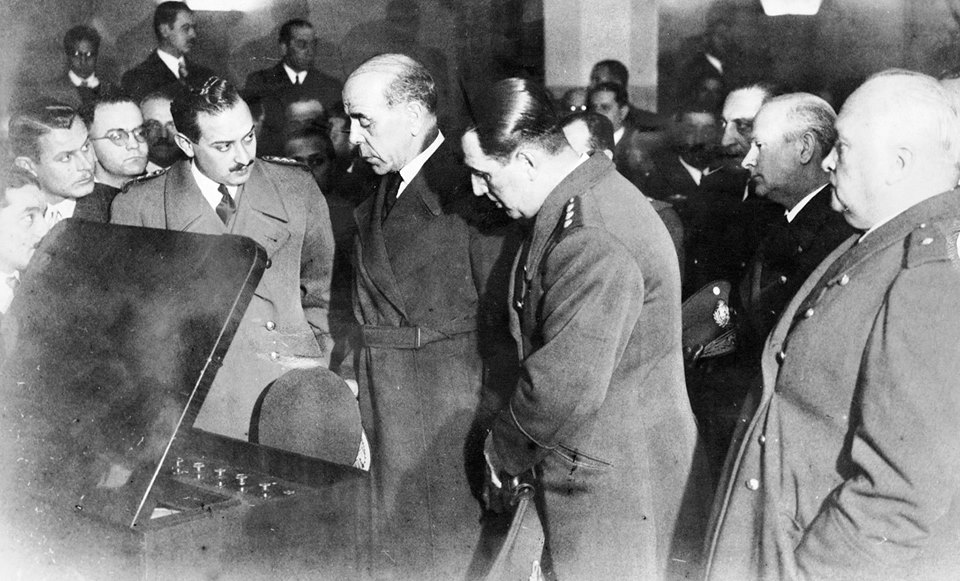
Martín Tow showing television transmission equipment to President Edelmiro Farrell and Vice President Juan Perón in 1944.

=== Beginnings (1945–1959) ===
The first license for a television network in Argentina was given to Martín Tow in 1945, but only experimental. Argentina's first television broadcast occurred on October 17, 1951, with the inaugural of then state-owned Canal 7, developed by Radio Belgrano executive Jaime Yankelevich. The broadcast began with a transmission of the last public act of Eva Perón alongside Juan Perón on the Loyalty Day at 14:20 p.m.

The first Argentine production was the newscast Primer Telenoticioso Argentino that premiered on April 20, 1954 on Canal 7. Other important shows of the time were cooking show Jueves Hogareños with famous cookbook author and television chef Doña Petrona, the first telenovelas under Teleteatro de la Tarde and later Teleteatro para la Hora del Té, humorous show Tato y sus Monólogos by Tato Bores, and American sports show Gillette Cavalcade of Sports.

On November 25, 1957, the decree-law 15460/57 was approved, which established the granting of licenses, leading to the birth of private television.

=== Expansion (1960–1973) ===
Since 1960, Argentine television began to expand. On April 18, 1960, Canal 12 (now El Doce) from Córdoba started broadcasting, becoming the second network to launch. During the same year, on June 9, Canal 9 launched on Buenos Aires under the Compañía Argentina de Televisión S.A. or Ca-de-te (Argentine Company of Television), linked to the Argentine film studio Emelco and with financial support from NBC. On October 1, 1960, Canal 13 began broadcasting under the company Río de la Plata S.A. TV, founded by Cuban businessman Goar Mestre and the American network CBS. One year later, on July 21, 1961, Teleonce launched from Buenos Aires, known as Difusión Contemporánea S.A. company (Contemporary Broadcasting S.A.), or DiCon for a short period of time before adopting the Teleonce name. The last national broadcast network to launch was TeveDos from La Plata, on June 25, 1966.

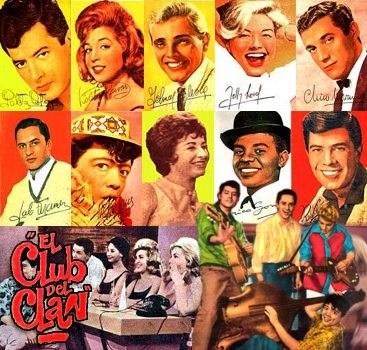
In the early '60s, variety show El Club del Clan aired on Canal 13 on Saturday nights, becoming a success and turning Palito Ortega, Violeta Rivas and Raúl Lavié into stars, among others.

Despite the fact that the legislation did not allow foreign companies to participate in the television business in any case, the three private networks in Buenos Aires in the beginning had a relationship with the Big Three television networks from the United States as shareholders and exclusive providers of technology and content. NBC worked with Canal 9, ABC with Teleonce, and CBS with Canal 13. Due to the low success with programming proposals from the American networks, they were finally sold to new owners. In December 1963, Canal 9 was sold to the owner of Radio Libertad, Alejandro Romay. In the mid-1960s, Editorial Atlántida and Mestre's wife bought the shares of the Canal 13, and later in 1970, Teleonce was acquired by Héctor Ricardo García, owner of newspaper Crónica.

The arrival of private television in the 1960s also meant the arrival of notable technical advances such as the Ampex machine that allowed recording on reels of tape without cuts, as well as an advertising offensive that scrapped the static plates and where the stations themselves commercialized their airtime through their commercial managers. The relative political and economic stability generated an explosive increase in the number of devices, specialized magazines such as Antena, Canal TV and TV Guía, while other magazines for shows such as Radiolandia began to focus on the media and the audience measurements (ratings) that showed the programs preferred by the audiences: sketch comedies Felipe, Viendo a Biondi and Telecómicos; comedies Dr. Cándido Pérez, Señoras, La Familia Falcón and La Nena; telenovelas like El Amor Tiene Cara de Mujer and Cuatro Hombres para Eva; and American shows like The Fugitive, Bonanza, Combat!, Route 66, Peyton Place, I Love Lucy, The Three Stooges, The Dick Van Dyke Show, Walt Disney's Wonderful World of Color, Lassie and The Adventures of Rin Tin Tin.

Other shows like Ayer, the first Argentine documentary series began airing during the decade. Some shows began aiming to specific target audiences like Titanes en el Ring, El Capitán Piluso and El Flequillo de Balá for children; El Club del Clan and Escala Musical for young adults; and Buenas Tardes, Mucho Gusto aimed at a female audience. During weekends, live long-running shows like Sábados Circulares, Sábados Continuados, Sábados de la Bondad and Domingos de mi ciudad (later renamed Feliz Domingo para la Juventud) had a great impact. The decade ended with coverage of the arrival of man on the Moon on July 20, 1969, and the success of classic shows such as Los Campanelli, Telenoche, Almorzando con Mirtha Legrand and La Campana de Cristal.

At the same time, networks outside of Buenos Aires began to incorporate the recording machines, broadcasting the programming of Buenos Aires on a delayed basis. The poor quality of the signal beyond 60 kilometers from the transmitting antennas led to the creation of network affiliate stations, in addition to the creation of the first closed circuits in various locations, giving birth to cable television.

=== Government intervention (1974–1983) ===
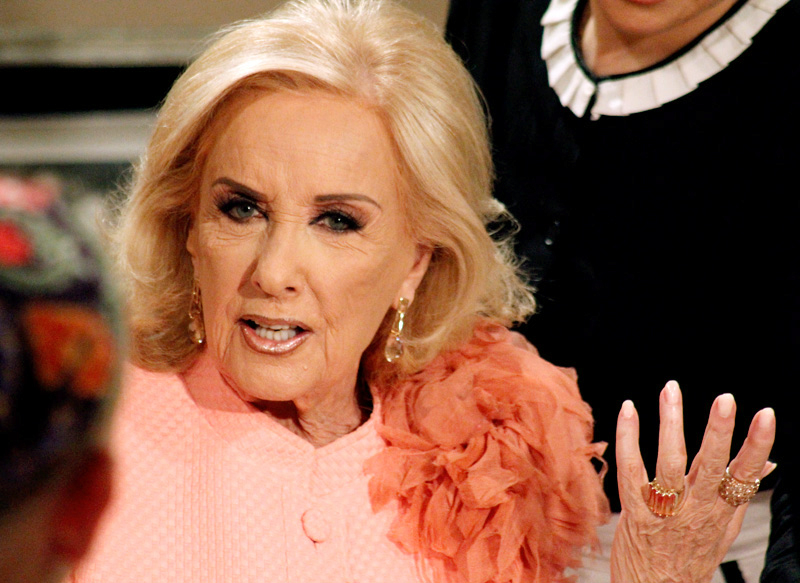
Being on the air since June 3, 1968, Almorzando con Mirtha Legrand (hosted by Mirtha Legrand, in the picture) has become Argentina's second longest-running show and one of the most popular since its premiere.

Previously, in 1968, the government expressed that network licenses should be renewed every 15 years, but on October 8, 1973, the licenses expired and were not renewed, so Canal 9, Teleonce, and Canal 13 were in an irregular situation. The private networks were intervened by the government, first partially and then definitively by a decree of the government of Isabel Perón on September 26, 1974, arguing that Argentina was not in a position to have commercial networks, and that television had to adopt a model similar to the European, dominated by public institutions.

Popular shows during the 1970s included variety shows Música en Libertad, Alta Tensión and Grandes Valores del Tango, sketch comedies like La Tuerca, Hiperhumor and El Chupete, competition shows Si lo Sabe Cante and Yo Me Quiero Casar, ¿y Usted? and telenovelas Rolando Rivas, Taxista, Pobre Diabla, Dos a Quererse and Piel Naranja, in which several actors and actresses like Arnaldo André, Claudio García Satur, Claudio Levrino, María de los Ángeles Medrano, Arturo Puig, Soledad Silveyra and Beatriz Taibo became famous.

After the 1976 Argentine coup d'état and the establishment of the civic-military dictatorship, previously private television channels came to be controlled by the Armed Forces: Canal 9 by the Army, Canal Once by the Air Force and Canal 13 by the Navy. Under the dictatorship, censorship and persecution of various people such as Norma Aleandro, Héctor Alterio, Carlos Carella, Juan Carlos Gené, Nacha Guevara, Víctor Laplace, Federico Luppi, Bárbara Mujica, Luis Politti, Marilina Ross, Irma Roy and David Stivel was exercised, and shows such as El Chupete and Déle Crédito a Tato were removed from the schedule.

Since Argentina was selected to host the 1978 FIFA World Cup, preparations to launch television in color began, by adopting the PAL system. This led to the change of name of Canal 7 to Argentina Televisora Color (Argentine Color Television), abbreviated as ATC on May 3, 1979. Later, the official inauguration of color transmissions was successfully held on May 1, 1980.

=== Return as private networks (1984–1999) ===
Licensing for commercial networks started after the return of democracy to Argentina. Alejandro Romay returned to own Canal 9 on May 25, 1984, and Canal 2 was given to José Irusta Cornet, whom associated with Héctor Ricardo García between 1987 and 1988. As for Canal Once and Canal 13, their licenses were declared void as there were no interested companies, and therefore, they continued under the government's administration during the government of Raúl Alfonsín, being later privatized by Carlos Menem on December 20, 1989. Canal Once was eventually acquired by Editorial Atlántida and later renamed as Telefe, and Canal 13 was taken over by Artear. On April 15, 1991, Canal 2 was acquired by Eduardo Eurnekián and renamed as América Te Ve.

During the 1980s, sketch comedy shows as No Toca Botón, Calabromas, Hiperhumor, Mesa de Noticias, Las Mil y Una de Sapag, Operación Ja-Ja and Las Gatitas y Ratones de Porcel, variety shows as Badía y Compañía, La Noche del Domingo, Finalísima del Humor, Seis para Triunfar, Atrévase a Soñar and Hola Susana, young-adult-oriented telenovela Clave de Sol, and American series The A-Team, Diff'rent Strokes and Knight Rider, were among the most remarkable.

Since 1989, the use of satellite television was authorized. This formed one of the main offers of cable television, which began its development.

Famous shows during the 1990s included telenovelas Vulnerables and Poliladron, sitcom The Nanny, game show It's a Knockout, variety shows Videomatch and PNP (Perdona Nuestros Pecados), talk shows La Biblia y el Calefón and Caiga Quien Caiga, children shows El Show de Xuxa, Jugate conmigo and Chiquititas, teen dramas Montaña Rusa and Beverly Hills, 90210, comedies La Familia Benvenuto and Pinky and the Brain, and horror miniseries El Garante.

On September 25, 1998, Canal 13 became the first network to carry out experimental high-definition digital television broadcasts, after adopting ATSC standards in a government resolution.

=== Present era (2000–present) ===
Starting the 2000s, television saw the arrival of various reality shows such as Big Brother, Star Academy, Popstars and Dancing with the Stars. Adaptations of sitcoms and other American series were also important, like The Nanny, Who's the Boss?, Married... with Children, Bewitched and Desperate Housewives. Telenovelas still remained important, and foreign telenovelas managed to reach large audiences. Later, networks started switching to high-definition and allowing to interact though social media.

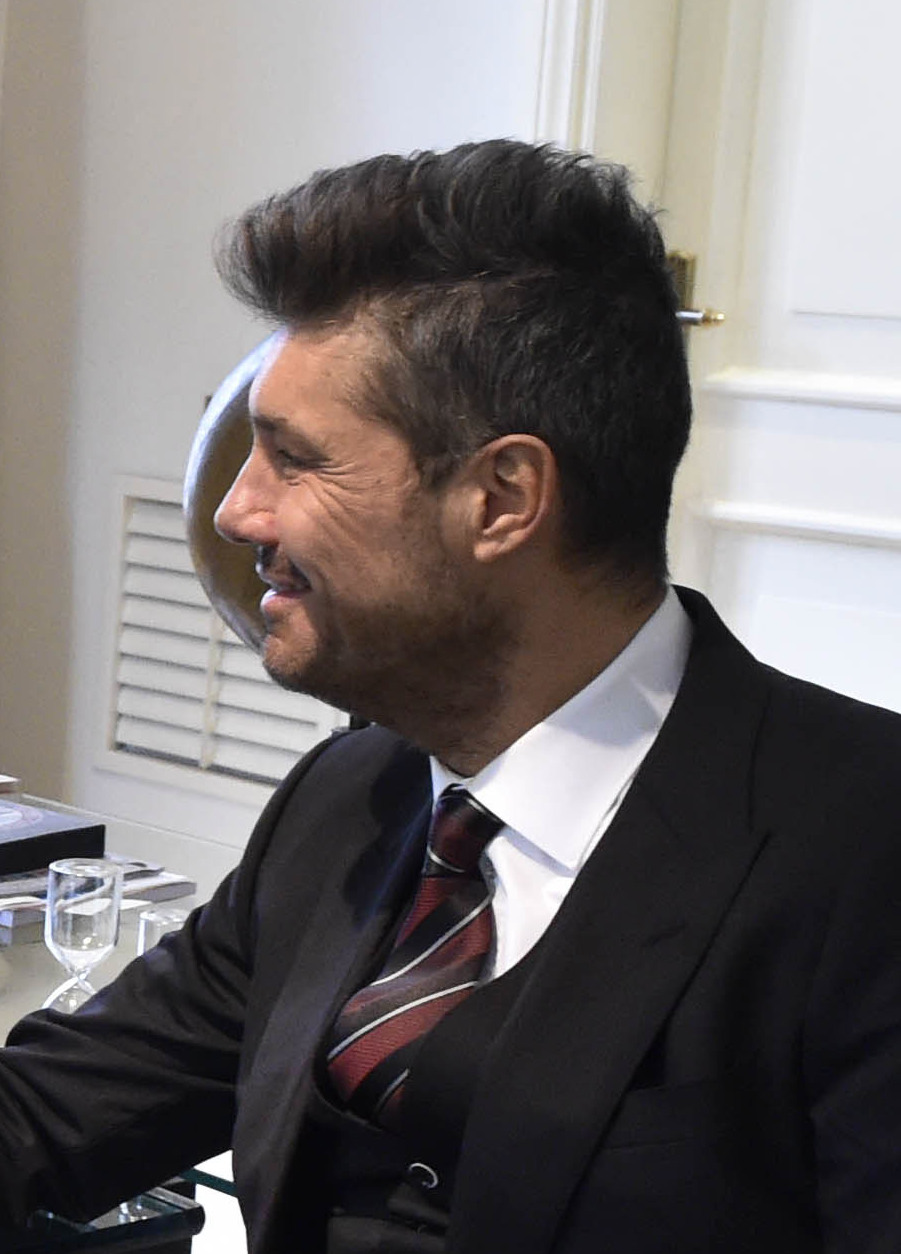
Hosted by Marcelo Tinelli, Showmatch has been the most watched show ten times since 2005.

During the 2000s shows like Showmatch, La Noche del 10, No Hay 2 sin 3, Duro de Domar, Resistiré, Big Brother, Star Academy, Rebelde Way, Son Amores, Floricienta, Sin Código and Casi Ángeles were considered as the hits of the decade.

In April 2006, the Secretary of Communications issued the Resolution 4/2006, by which a commission for the study and analysis of digital television systems was created. This commission would study the available systems considering the technical advances produced, and recommend a standard. One of the objectives of this commission was to consider, in addition to the specific technical advantages, other factors such as investments, job creation, technology transfer and social inclusion. The intention was that the choice of the standard would act as a tool for the social and economic development of the country. In 2009, the Secretary of Communications annulled the resolution made in 1998, and recommended the adoption of the Japanese standard for digital television. In this way, the "Argentine Digital Terrestrial Television System" was created, based on the ISDB-T standard. Also, starting in 2008, cable operator Cablevisión and satellite operator DirecTV, were the first to offer high-definition television services using ATSC standard with DVR sets.

In 2009, the government created the program Fútbol para Todos. It presented football matches from tournaments of the First Division, Primera B Nacional and Copa Argentina, as well as matches of the Copa Libertadores and Copa Sudamericana when teams from Argentina were involved, and some matches of the Argentina national football team. Mostly aired on Televisión Pública, beginning in 2016 the show was also broadcast on the other main networks. The program ended on June 27, 2017, after the Argentine Football Association sold the rights for the games to Fox Sports and Turner.

Most watched shows in the 2010s include variety shows Showmatch, Almorzando con Mirtha Legrand, Susana Giménez Peligro: Sin Codificar and Peter Capusotto y Sus Videos, telenovelas Graduados, Solamente Vos, Malparida, Esperanza Mía, Educando a Nina, 100 Días para Enamorarse and Argentina, Tierra de Amor y Venganza, dramas Historia de un Clan, Para Vestir Santos, El Hombre de tu Vida, El Puntero, El Marginal, Un Gallo para Esculapio and Sandro de América, reality shows Bake Off Argentina, Big Brother, Perdidos en la Tribu and La Voz Argentina, talk shows Intrusos and AM, Antes del Mediodía, game show A Todo o Nada and cooking show Cocineros Argentinos. Foreign telenovelas began to occupy more time on the networks' schedules, like Avenida Brasil, Amor à Vida, Binbir Gece, Fatmagül'ün Suçu Ne? and Os Dez Mandamentos being among the most watched shows of the decade. Esperanza Mía became the first Argentine show to be filmed in Ultra-high-definition in 2015.

Owned by Grupo Perfil and operated by Kuarzo Entertainment Argentina, Net TV made its formal debut on October 1, 2018, becoming the sixth must carry broadcast network and the first in 54 years after the launch of América TV. Four years later, Grupo Crónica launched Bravo TV, the last must carry broadcast network to go on the air, on March 14, 2022.

== Television channels and networks ==
In Argentina, television is available via broadcast (also known as "over-the-air") – the earliest method of receiving television programming, which merely requires an antenna and an equipped internal or external tuner capable of picking up channels that transmit on the two principal broadcast bands, very high frequency (VHF) and ultra high frequency (UHF), in order to receive the signal – and four conventional types of multichannel subscription television: cable, unencrypted satellite ("free-to-air"), direct-broadcast satellite television and IPTV (Internet protocol television).

Elevated programming tiers commonly start with an expanded basic package, offering a selection of subscription channels intended for wide distribution. Since the upspring of digital cable and satellite television during the mid- and late 1990s, additional channels with more limited distribution are offered as add-ons to the basic packages through separate tiers, which are commonly organized based on the programming format of the channels sold in the tier. A la carte subscription services in Argentina are primarily limited to pay television (more commonly known as "premium") channels that are offered as add-ons to any programming package that a customer of a multichannel video programming distributor (also known as a cable or satellite "system" or "provider") can subscribe to for an additional monthly fee.

=== Broadcast television ===
Argentina has a "decentralized", market-oriented television system, particularly in regard to broadcast television. The country has a national public television service (Canal Siete). Local media markets have their own television stations, which may either be affiliated with or owned and operated by a television network. Stations may sign affiliation agreements with one of the national networks for the local rights to carry their programming.

==== Major broadcast networks ====
Network	Launch date	Type	Owner	Operator
Canal Siete	17 October 1951	Public	Government of Argentina	Radio y Televisión Argentina S.A.U.
El Nueve	9 June 1960	Private	Grupo Octubre	Telearte S.A.
El Trece	1 October 1960	Private	Clarín Group	Arte Radiotelevisivo Argentino S.A.
Telefe	21 July 1961	Private	Grupo Televisión Litoral	Televisión Federal S.A.
América	25 June 1966	Private	Grupo América & Claudio Belocopitt	América TV S.A.
Net TV	1 October 2018	Private	Editorial Perfil	Kuarzo Entertainment
Alpha TV	14 September 2026	Private	Alpha Media Group	Alpha Media S.A.

==== Over-the-air commercial television networks ====
The following are the television networks with a presence throughout the national territory, via the "Televisión Digital Abierta" (Open Digital Television in English).

Channel	Network	Launch date	Type	Owner	Operator	Description
22.1	Encuentro	5 March 2007	Public	Government of Argentina	Contenidos Públicos S.E.	Educational television
22.2	Pakapaka	17 September 2010	Public	Government of Argentina	Contenidos Públicos S.E.	Children's programming
22.3	Aunar	17 October 2022	Public	Government of Argentina	Contenidos Públicos S.E.	Public television
22.4	Cine AR	28 December 2010	Public	Government of Argentina	Contenidos Públicos S.E.	Argentinian movies
22.5	Tec	12 September 2011	Public	Government of Argentina	Contenidos Públicos S.E.	Educational television
23.1	Canal Siete	17 October 1951	Public	Government of Argentina	Radio y Televisión Argentina S.E.	Public television
23.2	Construir TV	21 March 2011	Private	Fundación UOCRA	Fundación UOCRA	Construction/Lifestyle
24.1	DeporTV	21 February 2013	Public	Government of Argentina	Contenidos Públicos S.E.	Sports
24.2	Canal 26	4 March 1996	Private	Telecentro	Grupo Pierri	News programming
24.3	France 24	6 December 2006	Public	Government of France	France Médias Monde	News programming
24.4	Crónica Televisión	3 January 1994	Private	Grupo Olmos	Estrellas Satelital S.A.	News programming
24.5	Argentina/12	17 October 2020	Private	Grupo Octubre	Telearte S.A.	News programming
24.6	El Destape TV	4 August 2023	Private	Talar Producciones S.A.	—N/a	News programming
25.1	Unife	25 November 2019	Private	Universal Church	Universal Church	Religious
25.2	C5N	6 August 2007	Private	Grupo Indalo	Grupo Indalo	News programming
25.3	La Nación +	7 November 2016	Private	Grupo La Nación	La Nación	News programming
25.4	Telesur	24 July 2005	Public	Governments of Venezuela, Cuba and Nicaragua	SiBCI	News programming
25.5	RT en Español	28 December 2009	Public	Government of Russia	TV-Novosti	News programming
25.6	+Perfil	3 August 2026	Private	Editorial Perfil	Perfil	News programming

==== International networks ====
Network	Programming	Other participating networks	Owner
América Internacional	Commercial television	América TV, A24	Grupo América
Canal Siete Internacional	Public television	Canal Siete, Encuentro, Pakapaka, Cine.Ar, Tec and DeporTV	Government of Argentina
Telefe Internacional	Commercial television	Telefe	Grupo Televisión Litoral
El Trece Internacional	Commercial television	El Trece, TN, TyC Sports, Volver, Ciudad Magazine, Metro, América Sports and Canal Rural	Clarín Group

=== Cable and satellite television ===
In the late 1950s, broadcast television coverage did not reach most of the cities of the country. That is why a group of entrepreneurs decided to let households from all the provinces have access to television, which was a privilege of Buenos Aires and a handful of cities across the country.

The first milestone of cable television was in November 1963, when a closed-circuit television service was developed in the neighborhood of Villa Cabrera in Córdoba that had a range of 4 kilometers. This was followed by the project Sonovisión in Salta, which between 1963 and 1965 reached to 700 subscribers. These initiatives were replicated quickly, through closed-circuits and community antennas. It is estimated that, by 1966, there were already about 30 systems running, and most of them were assembled with technology national manufacture; and, by 1970, there were already 31 cities with cable television systems.

Later, after almost a decade of commitment to the development of the sector, closed-circuits and community antennas got the recognition of the government through the "National Telecommunications Law", sanctioned in 1972.

In the 1980s, cable television system reached 1,000 operators, with an estimated number of 300,000 subscribers in Buenos Aires and 2 million subscribers across the country.

During the 1990s, satellite television began operating across the country with the arrival of companies such as DirecTV.

In 2007, the government authorised the merging of the two biggest cable television companies in the country: Cablevisión and Multicanal, making it the biggest provider of cable television with the owning of 47 percent of the market.

Cable television has become the most used type of delivering, with 73.2 percent of households having a cable provider. Meanwhile satellite television only reaches 10.2 percent of households across the country.

== Switch to digital television ==
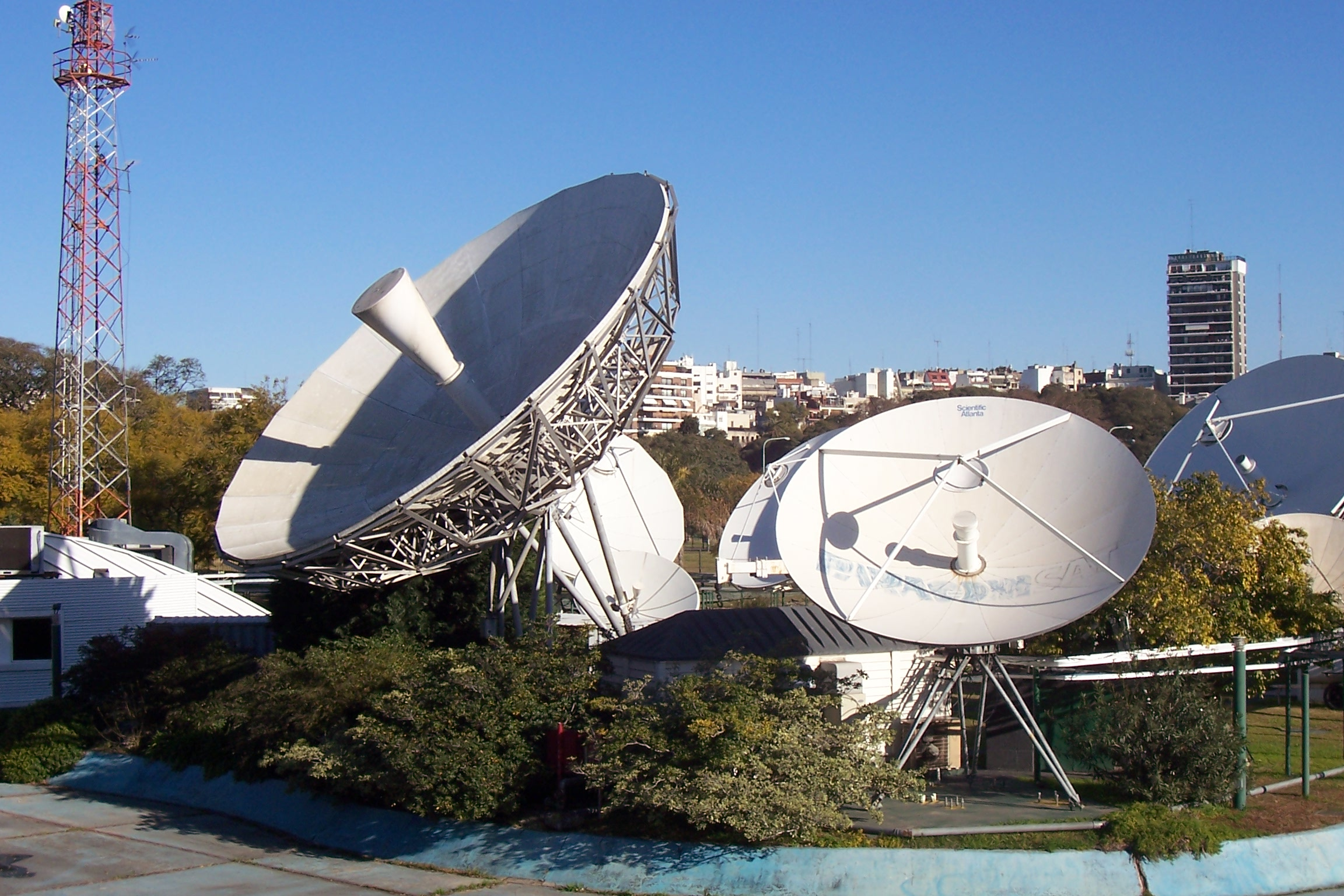
Satellite transmitters from Televisión Pública in Buenos Aires.

Argentina have been adopting the Japanese standard ISDB-T, with modifications performed by Brazil. Initially Argentina had selected ATSC standard in 1998 (backed by Clarín Group) over DVB-T, promoted by the biggest telecommunications and European cellphone manufacturers like Nokia. There had been experimental ATSC broadcasts since 1999 before the government overruled the decision. There was an agreement between Brazil and Argentina, signed in the light of the Mercosur trade bloc, where both countries agreed to share information, studies and efforts to select the same digital television standards.

By August 27, 2009, the government officially announced that the Japanese standard was adopted, along with Chile and Peru at the same time. The goal behind this political decision is to achieve a wide, free, high-quality regional television.

HDTV-ready TV sales increased in the 2010s in Argentina, when the first TVs became available since 2005 by Philips. The company introduced back then three HD-ready (1080i) CRT TVs in 25, 29, and 33-inch versions. These TVs were manufactured in Tierra del Fuego, Argentina and included PAL-N/B and NTSC analogue tuners, plus HD component video inputs. Only a single model, the 25-inch, 16:9 one featured HDMI. As of 2008, the firm has switched to LCDs.

In November 2008, cable operator Cablevisión, which merged with Multicanal, started offering its high-definition television service. It uses ATSC, and the company made mandatory the purchase of its "HD Tuner with DVR" at a cost of around 200 USD. As of late 2008, most LCDs advertised as "Full HD" offered at least 1080i signal support.

As of December 2013, digital television has reached 80 percent of Argentina. Argentina was expected to end all analogue broadcasts in 2019, later in 2021, and it is finally expected to conclude its analogue shutdown on March 31, 2026.

== Audience ==
The first national organization specialized in collecting information on popular tastes in television was the Audience Verifying Institute (Instituto Verificador de Audiencias in Spanish), a non-profit entity formed by networks, advertisers and advertising agencies. However, the first measurement made as a systematic service was carried out by the IPSA company —owned by the American company Nielsen Media Research—, which in the 1970s began to count viewers with the paper "viewer diaries" system.

In 1972, Mercados y Tendencias was in charge of measuring the audience only in Buenos Aires. It was made with the same system until the early 1980s, when the "home meter" was introduced. It was an electronic device that monitored only the tuning of television. As it did not allow data to be entered regarding the composition of the audience —such as age or sex—, it was necessary to complete the information by writing it down on paper. At that time, Buenos Aires was the eighth city in the world to mechanize its measurement. However, this system was deficient. For this reason, this system gave late results.

In 1993, IBOPE arrived in the country with the people meter system, which later began to be used by all measuring companies. This new technology ensures another type of measurement because it allows discrimination of the audience by gender, age, and socioeconomic status, among others. Later, in 1999, after two months of negotiations, IBOPE bought Mercados y Tendencias, leaving IBOPE with as the only rating measurer in Argentina. In December 2014, IBOPE was acquired by the Kantar Group, renaming itself as Kantar IBOPE Media.

Audience is measured in nine regions of Argentina, in the Greater Buenos Aires, Greater Rosario, Greater Córdoba, Greater Mendoza, Mar del Plata, San Miguel de Tucumán, Santa Fe and Paraná, Bahía Blanca, and the Alto Valle in the provinces of Neuquén and Río Negro. To estimate the audience of a day, it is divided into three time ranges: "First afternoon" (which covers from 12 to 4 p.m.), "second afternoon" (from 4 to 8 p.m.) and the "prime time" (from 8 p.m. to 12 a.m.).

Since 2015, a new competitor appeared on stage as an audience measurer. SMAD (Sistema de Medición de Audiencia Digital in Spanish), reaches a number of households bigger than that of Kantar IBOPE, and does so through a system that in which the data is loaded into the system, without weighting or validation, and in the analysis it allows discriminating high-definition signals among other things.

Since January 16, 2017, Kantar IBOPE began measuring the Twitter audience for free-to-air television programs broadcasting in Argentina (excluding sport events). Measuring data come from the impressions (number of times tweets related to a program were seen during its broadcast), accounts (number of different Twitter accounts that made at least one comment on a certain show during its broadcast), and the tweets (total number of tweets related to a certain show during its broadcast). At the same time, only tweets sent from the first to the last minute of the broadcast of the show are considered.

Kantar IBOPE also began measuring the audience index of all television shows that are watched live and/or delayed up to seven days after their broadcast (also known as Live+7) on all possible platforms, including televisions, PCs and notebooks, tablets and/or cell phones, since October 2019.

=== Top-rated networks and programs in Argentina ===
The table below lists television networks and shows in Argentina with the highest average audience rating for each television season since 1985.

Top-rated networks and programs in Argentina
Season	Top-rated network		Top-rated program		
Season	Network	HH rating	Show	Network	HH rating
1985	Canal 9	12.5	—N/a	—N/a	—N/a
1986	Canal 9	11.9	—N/a	—N/a	—N/a
1987	Canal 9	15.1	—N/a	—N/a	—N/a
1988	Canal 9	12.5	—N/a	—N/a	—N/a
1989	Canal 9	14.3	—N/a	—N/a	—N/a
1990	Telefe	16.2	—N/a	—N/a	—N/a
1991	Telefe	15.1	—N/a	—N/a	—N/a
1992	Telefe	14.0	—N/a	—N/a	—N/a
1993	Telefe	13.2	—N/a	—N/a	—N/a
1994	Telefe	11.5	—N/a	—N/a	—N/a
1995	Telefe	12.2	—N/a	—N/a	—N/a
1996	Telefe	11.6	—N/a	—N/a	—N/a
1997	Telefe	13.5	—N/a	—N/a	—N/a
1998	Telefe	12.5	—N/a	—N/a	—N/a
1999	Telefe	13.5	—N/a	—N/a	—N/a
2000	Telefe	12.7	—N/a	—N/a	—N/a
2001	Telefe	13.0	Videomatch	Telefe	25.4
2002	Telefe	11.2	Videomatch	Telefe	25.3
2003	Telefe	12.5	Son Amores	Canal 13	30.9
2004	Telefe	15.0	Los Roldán	Telefe	33.1
2005	Telefe	14.3	Showmatch	Canal 9	23.6
2006	Telefe	14.4	Showmatch	El Trece	25.5
2007	Telefe	13.0	Showmatch	El Trece	26.6
2008	Telefe	11.4	Showmatch	El Trece	25.7
2009	Telefe	11.6	Valientes	El Trece	27.1
2010	El Trece	10.1	Showmatch	El Trece	29.9
2011	El Trece	10.5	Showmatch	El Trece	27.4
2012	Telefe	11.2	Graduados	Telefe	23.6
2013	Telefe	8.6	Solamente Vos	El Trece	12.8
2014	Telefe	8.9	Showmatch	El Trece	20.6
2015	Telefe	8.4	Showmatch	El Trece	20.6
2016	Telefe	8.9	Moisés y los 10 Mandamientos	Telefe	17.3
2017	Telefe	8.0	Showmatch	El Trece	17.8
2018	Telefe	7.7	La Voz Argentina	Telefe	16.9
2019	Telefe	7.7	Showmatch	El Trece	14.0
2020	Telefe	8.0	MasterChef Celebrity (Sunday)	Telefe	17.1
2021	Telefe	9.0	La Voz Argentina	Telefe	20.2
2022	Telefe	8.6	Gran Hermano	Telefe	19.4
2023	Telefe	8.2	Gran Hermano	Telefe	20.4
2024	Telefe	7.8	2024 Copa América	Telefe	28.5
2025	Telefe	6.9	2026 World Cup Qualification	Telefe	23.2

== See also ==
- Television in Latin America
