= Débora Pérez Volpin =

Argentinian journalist

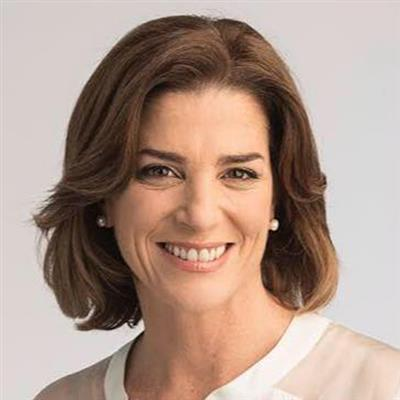
- Born: Débora Denise Pérez Volpin; 30 December 1967; Caballito, Buenos Aires, Argentina
- Died: 6 February 2018 (aged 50); Palermo, Buenos Aires, Argentina
- Education: University of Buenos Aires
- Occupation: Journalist
- Political party: Evolución

Débora Denise Pérez Volpin (30 December 1967 – 6 February 2018) was an Argentine politician, journalist and television host. She was the host of the news program Todo Noticias since 1996 and the program Arriba Argentinos since its inception in 2005.

== Childhood and adolescence ==
As a child, Pérez Volpin dreamed of studying medicine, influenced by her father who was a director of the Juan A. Fernández Hospital in the city of Buenos Aires. She had also wanted to pursue a career in social communication sciences. She completed her secondary studies at Colegio Nacional de Buenos Aires, where she had her first experience in communications. Here, she contributed to the founding of the school magazine. According to Pérez Volpin, this publication was a very prestigious means of information for students.

== Career ==
After she finished high school, she decided to enroll for the medicine career she would begin in March of the following year. However, she decided to start her career in social communication and when she studied semiology, she realized that her true vocation leaned towards the latter.

Her first job in the media was as a producer on Radio Belgrano (Radio Belgrano), while she was still studying at the university. It was about a magazine with Enrique Vázquez that aired at 7:00 a.m..

She made contributions to graphic media such as the 13/20 magazine for young people.

She worked for associate editors who published magazines such as Ser Única, Emanuelle, and a whole series of magazines in which she worked as an editor.

She made collaborations for the newspapers La Nación and Clarín.

=== Producer at Artear ===
In 1992, Pérez Volpin joined Artear with a group of young journalists that were working as interns. The entrance requirements were that they have been graduates of a communication school and had some experience in the media. She, like all of the group that had entered, began in production and was under the orders of Ricardo Pipino whose function was to form the new channel that was going to be released, Todo Noticias.

The first task of Pérez-Volpin was to call the various television channels in Argentina to explain that there would be a news channel, 24 hours a day, 365 days a year. When something happened in some locality or city, the channel that was in that locality had to send the coverage of the news to Artear. During a whole year, she went through different areas of production.

=== Reporter ===
Pérez Volpin's desire was to be a reporter on the street. She earned this position one summer, where she replaced reporters who had taken vacations. She was a reporter for four years where she worked from early in the morning to late at night. Her role was to be on the street with a cameraman and to send the material they produced for another person to edit and then broadcast to the public. Then, she started making mobiles and special reports for Telenoche.

=== Host ===
In 1996, she became a host of Todo Noticias. As a host -when she did not do it alone- she worked with José Antonio Gil Vidal, Mario Mazzone, Juan Micelli, Guillermo Lobo, Luis Otero, Santo Biasatti and Marcelo Bonelli.

From 2004 to 2005, she conducted Síntesis with Juan Miceli.

Pérez Volpin also worked in Canal (á) with the shows Anecdotario (2003–2009) and Entre Paréntesis.

She hosted Según como se mire in Radio Mitre (2008).

On 25 April 2005 the morning news program Arriba Argentinos began, and Pérez Volpin was chosen as a host along with Juan Miceli. Other hosts included Marcelo Bonelli, Marcelo Fiasche, Alejandra Peñalva y Nazarena Di Serio. Said newscast is the most watched in its strip. Her fans created forums on different websites and groups on Facebook where they uploaded photos and videos of the host.

On 21 June 2017, she quit to Canal 13 after 24 years −12 years as the host of the program- and Todo Noticias to be a candidate to the Legislature for the city of Buenos Aires.

=== Politics ===
In 2017, she entered politics and was elected legislator of the City of Buenos Aires as part of the Evolución front led by Martín Lousteau. She came third in the election with 12% of the votes and took office on 10 December of that year but she was only able to participate in one session of the legislature on 22 December 2017, when the budget of the City of Buenos Aires was approved, before her death.

== Death ==
On Monday, 5 February 2018, she entered the Trinidad Sanatorium of the city of Buenos Aires, which determined she had a "complex abdominal condition." On 6 February, she underwent an upper digestive endoscopy and suffered a cardiac arrest due to the perforation of the esophagus, filling her abdominal cavity with air, that caused her death. The journalist's family went to court and presented a complaint to dispute the claims of the sanatorium and on 7 February Judge Gabriel Ghirlanda determined Pérez Volpin's was a "wrongful homicide". After conducting an autopsy in the judicial morgue her remains were veiled in the Buenos Aires legislature on 8 February with public access between 2 and 10 pm, which was attended by four thousand people. She was buried next to her father, Aurelio Pérez Flores, in the Pantheon of the Asturians of the Chacarita Cemetery.

In April, after the resignation of Judge Gabriel Ghirlanda, the criminal case was left to his colleague Carlos Burniard. On 19 June 2018, endoscopist Diego Bioalolenkier and anesthesiologist Nélida Inés Puente were indicted, the only two individuals charged in the case. The Court also ordered the arrest of both professionals for the sum of 1.7 million pesos each.
