= Bienvenidos a bordo =

Argentine television programme

- Based on: Las Puertas (2016); Otra Noche Familiar (2019); Lo Mejor De La Familia (2017); Los Perros (2016); A Todo O Nada (2012-2017)
- Country of origin: Argentina
- Original language: Spanish
- No. of seasons: 3 (2022)
- No. of episodes: +600

Production
- Production company: Endemol Argentina

Original release
- Network: eltrece
- Release: 20 January 2020 – 28 July 2023

Related
- Tres Pasos y una Ayuda; Los 8 Escalones del Millón

Bienvenidos a bordo (English: Welcome Aboard) is an Argentine television programme created by Endemol. It was hosted by Guido Kaczka from 2020 to January 2022, with Laurita Fernández replacing him until the programme's end in July 2023. The show was shown on eltrece.

The programme shows participants of different ages, showing their qualities and participate for different prizes.

== Winners ==
- Similar to Fernando Burlando (2022)
- Similar to Hernán Drago (2022)

== Nomination and awards ==
Year	Award	Category	Work	Result	Ref.
2021	Premios Martín Fierro	Best program (Games of entertainment)	Bienvenidos a bordo	Won	
2021	Premios Martín Fierro	Work on masculine hosting	Guido Kaczka (Bienvenidos a bordo & Los 8 escalones del millón)	Won	
