= Arriba Argentinos =

Argentine news program

- Genre: News
- Presented by: Marcelo Bonelli
- Opening theme: "Un paso más allá" by Narcotango
- Country of origin: Argentina
- Original language: Spanish

Production
- Running time: 150 minutes (including commercials)

Original release
- Network: El Trece
- Release: April 25, 2005 – present

Related
- Agro Síntesis; Noticiero Trece; Telenoche; Síntesis

Arriba Argentinos (English: Get Up Argentines) is an Argentine news program, anchored by Marcelo Bonelli and broadcast in El Trece, Mondays to Fridays from 7:00 a.m. to 9:30 a.m.

The original format of the program is that people needs to get informed of "all that they need to know before leave home every morning, with constant updates of the weather, traffic reports and the state of the public services. Every half-hour top stories are reviewed.

== History ==
The program premiered on Monday, April 25, 2005, then anchored by Débora Pérez Volpin and Juan Micelli, who stepped down as anchor by the end of the year, being replaced by Marcelo Bonelli. Since its inception, Arriba Argentinos has used as opening theme the song "Un paso más allá" by Narcotango.

== Awards and nominations ==
- Martín Fierro Award 2007 – Nominated

== Staff ==
- Anchors: Débora Pérez Volpin (2005-2017) and Marcelo Bonelli (2005–present)
- Sports news: Pablo Gravellone
- Weather: Nazarena Di Serio
- Show biz: Jimena Grandinetti
- Traffic news: Alejandro Ramos
