= Luciana Geuna =

Argentine journalist

Luciana Geuna (August 10, 1977) is an Argentine journalist. She hosts the news program Telenoche.

Geuna was born in Rosario, Santa Fe.

== Awards ==
=== Nominations ===
- 2013 Martín Fierro Awards
  - Best female journalist
