= Televisión Pública Noticias =

Argentine TV news program

Televisión Pública Noticias (Spanish: Public Television News; formerly called Visión 7) is an Argentine TV news program.

== Awards ==
=== Nominations ===
- 2013 Martín Fierro Awards
  - Best female journalist (Gabriela Radice)
  - Best male journalist (Pedro Brieger)
