= Los 8 escalones =

Argentine game show

Los 8 escalones (lit. The Eight Steps) is an Argentine game show, hosted by Guido Kaczka and broadcast on El Trece.

== Gameplay ==
The objective of the game is to answer multiple choice trivia questions correctly to move up the stairs. Correctly answering one guarantees that the participant goes up the stairs, while an incorrect answer risks them going down a step as well as one of their three lives. The game ends when the participant loses all of their lives. When the participant manages to make it to the eighth step, he or she wins 10,000 pesos and can continue playing to increase their winnings.

== Spinoff ==
A spinoff, Los 8 escalones del millón (The Eight Steps of the Million), has been airing on El Trece since July 26, 2021.

In Los 8 escalones del millón, there are eight contestants at the start. There is one category or topic for each step, and contestants are given two trivia questions each. The contestant who does the worst is eliminated, indicated by staying where they are.

At the penultimate step, two contestants are given a multiple choice trivia question. Up to ten questions are given to the contestants. The contestant who gets more correct answers wins 1,000,000 Argentine pesos and can return on the next day to increase their winnings.

== Uruguayan version ==
Los 8 escalones has a Uruguayan series based on the original Argentine version. It is also titled Los 8 escalones and premiered on Canal 4 on March 16, 2021.

== Awards ==
- 2014 Martín Fierro awards: Best entertainment program.
- 2015 Martín Fierro Awards: Best entertainment program.
