= Pasapalabra (Argentine game show) =

Argentine game show

- Genre: Game show
- Based on: The Alphabet Game by: Rebecca Thornhill; Mark Maxwell-Smith; Andrew O'Connor
- Directed by: Fernando Espinosa
- Presented by: Iván de Pineda (2016–2020; 2021–2022; 2025–present); Claribel Medina (2002)
- Country of origin: Argentina
- Original language: Spanish
- No. of seasons: 5
- No. of episodes: 900 (2016–2021)

Production
- Executive producer: Mariel Moran
- Producer: Ricardo Pichetto
- Production location: City of Buenos Aires
- Running time: 90 minutes
- Production companies: WarnerMedia Latin America; ITV Studios; Kocawa

Original release
- Network: Azul TV
- Release: 7 January – 18 March 2002
- Network: El Trece
- Release: 21 January 2016 – 10 April 2020
- Network: Telefe
- Release: 1 March 2021 – 6 November 2022
- Release: 26 January 2025 – present

Related
- The Alphabet Game; Pasapalabra

Pasapalabra is an Argentine television program that replicates the format of the Spanish program of the same name, which in turn is based on the British contest The Alphabet Game, and has been broadcast in intervals since 2002. It began on 7 January 2002, on Azul TV with Claribel Medina. In January 2016, 15 years later, the format returned to broadcast television with Iván de Pineda as host for El Trece, until the end of 2020. Months later, the network Telefe acquired the rights and revived the production, starting on 1 March 2021.

== History ==
The program featured the hosting of Claribel Medina in January 2002 on Azul TV and then returned in 2016 completely renewed, on eltrece and hosted by Iván de Pineda. Since then, it has broadcast four uninterrupted seasons.

In April 2020, due to the coronavirus pandemic, the cycle went off the air after several repetitions.

In November 2020, it was confirmed that the program would return in the first quarter of 2021 but this time on Telefe.

== Format ==
The program consists of two teams (blue and orange) of three people, where the captain is the participant, who is accompanied by two famous guests. During the first stage of the chapter, the teams compete in different games whose objective is the sum of seconds for the final game, called "the rosco". In the latter only the captains play, who compete for the jackpot. The winner of the chapter that does not complete "the rosco" will be able to continue participating in the next one.

== Hosts ==
Year	Host	Channel
2002	Claribel Medina	Azul TV – El Nueve
2016–2020; 2021–2022; 2025–present	Iván de Pineda	eltrece – Telefe

== Games ==
This is the list of games prior to the rosco.

- Track
- The Music Track
- The Music Track (International)
- One Of Four
- Tutti Frutti
- Spell the word
- Where are they?
- Crossing words
- Alphabet soup
- How is this written?
- Acted Words
- Weaponword
- Who are they?
- Vowels and consonants

== Winners ==
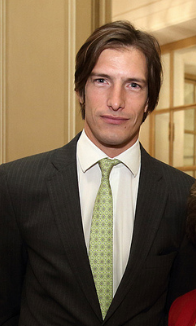

Since 2016, there have been six winners of the Roscoː Horacio Moavro, Diego Aira, Martina Barraza, Camilo Rubio, Diego Ramos and Brian Parkinson. Below is a table with the amounts won in the rosco over the last four seasons. In some cases, an amount earned in Argentine pesos translates into a lower amount in dollars due to the devaluation suffered by Argentina in recent years. The champions faced each other five times. On two occasions, Diego Aira defeated Martina Barraza and on another Diego Aira defeated Camilo Rubio. On one occasion Brian Parkinson defeated Martina Barraza and on another Martina Barraza defeated Brian Parkinson.

=== Participants ===
Date	Season	Amount delivered ($ ARS)	Equivalent amount ($ USD)	Winner(s)	# roscos played until winning
28 July 2021	2021	$1,760,000	$18,218	Brian Parkinson	53
17 July 2021	2021	$100,000	$1,038	Diego Ramos (Celebrity Edition)	1
7 March 2019	2019	$1,940,000	$47,098	Camilo Rubio	27
12 July 2018	2018	$1,300,000	$46,430	Diego Aira	64
14 February 2018	2018	$1,340,000	$68,089	Martina Barraza	10
1 June 2016	2016	$300,000	$21,126	Horacio Moavro	1

== Champions who did not win the Rosco ==
There were also other champions who stayed many programs but could not take the Roscoː

- Ramiro Faríasː 68 programs (before his definitive defeat he lost twice but on both occasions he returned to the program the following day after winning the repechage).
- Diego Pokorski: 47 programs
- Ivanna Hrycː 31 programs
- Carol Legnazzi: 26 programs
- Sergio Rodríguez: 17 programs
- Gabriel Estrany: 13 programs
