= Telenueve =

Telenueve is an Argentine television news program. It is aired by Canal 9 since 2002.
