= Piñón Fijo =

Fabián Alberto Gómez (born August 20, 1965) also known by his stage name "Piñon Fijo" (Spanish: Fixed-gear) is an Argentine clown, actor, singer-songwriter and television host dedicated to the entertainment of children. He's characterized for his routines, songs, juggling, magic and all about fun to entertain all audiences. Gómez has a self-titled children's television series in El Trece. He has also appeared in a children's movie, "Piñón Fijo y la magia de la música" (Spanish: Piñón Fijo and the magic of music).
