= Got Talent Argentina =

Argentine reality television series

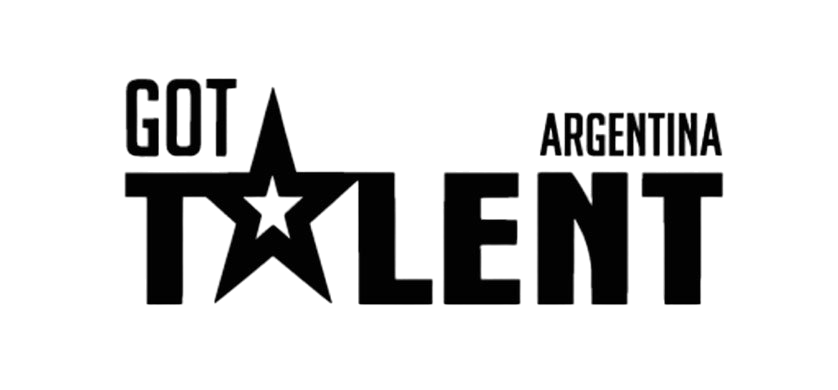
- Created by: Simon Cowell
- Presented by: Mariano Peluffo; Lizy Tagliani
- Judges: Catherine Fulop; Maximiliano Guerra; Kike Teruel
- Country of origin: Argentina
- No. of series: 4

Production
- Running time: 30 – 150 mins
- Production company: FremantleMedia

Original release
- Network: Telefe
- Release: July 27, 2008 – present

Got Talent Argentina, previously named Talento Argentino ("Argentine Talent"), is a television show, based on the British format Got Talent series, which airs on the Telefe. It originally aired in 2008 TV schedule to mid 2011, with the initial three seasons led by Mariano Peluffo.

The show has three jurors responsible for selecting people with certain talents, from whom the winner is chosen by the public.

After 12 years, Telefe confirmed a fourth season, which premiered on August 21, 2023 with Lizy Tagliani as the new host.

== Format ==
The program requires participants to demonstrate their skill in various disciplines such as singing, dancing, comedy, music and more. During the performance, three judges decide whether the contestant should stop performing by pressing a button that turns on a big red X. If three Xs appear, the participant is automatically removed without being able to finish his presentation.

Every week, through a vote with SMS and phone calls, the public chooses participants. Competitors in second and third place are considered by the jury to reach the final of the competition and a chance to win the pageant.

In the end, the winner is chosen by the public. In the first edition, the prize was a hundred thousand pesos Argentina ($100,000 ARS).

The three Xs

The X is the indicator of whether the jury is pleased by the talent. The Xs are white when no judge pressed his button.

Majority of white Xs: Most jurors think that a participant should go to the next stage. When most Xs are white, the participant remains in the talent show.

Majority of red Xs: Most of the jurors are opposed to the participant remaining in the contest.

== Season 1 (2008) ==
Broadcast: 27 July 2008 - 21 December 2008

After the success that took the competition around the world, Telefe bought the rights and issued it in mid-2008 with great success. Mariano Peluffo was the host of the contest, and the jury was made up of Venezuelan actress Catherine Fulop, the professional dancer Maximiliano Guerra, and Kike Teruel, the member of the group The Nocheros. The winner was comedian and impressionist Cordoba, Martín Bustos, who was rewarded with $100,000.

=== Statistics ===
- Number of selected participants: 132 (counting groups as one participant)
- Number of individual participants: 101
- Number of groups: 31
- Oldest participant: Ana Flora García (83)
- Youngest participant: Mariela Lavalleja (6)
- First foreign participant: Stepan Grytsay
- Unique in talent:
  - Michelle Sanchez (aerobic sports)
  - Maria Belen Barreiro (harp)
  - Juan Francisco Seguí (chair tango dancer)
  - Mariano Ramos (beat box with acrobatics)
  - Paul Mountain (bike trial)
  - Sergio Villagra (cartoonist)
  - Mauro y Nicole Proietto (acrobatic duo)
  - Ariel Rene Adorno (|malambo with bolas (cattle rounder))
  - Cesar Calabrese (mimo)
  - Cristian Fernandez (music in the body)
  - Gabriela Mugica y Flavio Fissolo (figure skating)
  - Maria Riquelme (pianist)
  - Mariela Lavallejf (reciter of verses)
  - Alexander Lencina (puppeteer)
  - Sebastian Mesa (saxophone)
  - The Gomez brothers "Shao Lin Pai" (wushu kung fu)
- Most common talent: singing (41 participants)

== Season 2 (2009) ==
The second edition of Talento Argentino started on 23 July 2009, with an average audience of 25.2 rating points. Again, the presentation of the contest was by Mariano Peluffo, with the same team of jurors as in the first edition, Catherine Fulop, Maximiliano Guerra, and Kike Teruel. 40,000 people auditioned, from Mendoza, Buenos Aires, Rosario, Mar del Plata, Bahía Blanca, Córdoba, San Luis, Salta, San Juan, Neuquén, Corrientes and Tucumán. The winner, Guitarist Daniel Ferreyra, took a $100,000 prize.

== Season 3 (2010–2011) ==
The third edition of Talento Argentino aired during late 2010 and early 2011. The winner of the third season was accordion player Diego Gutierrez.

== Winners ==
- Season 1, 2008: Martin Bustos (humorous imitation)
- Season 2, 2009: Daniel Ferreyra (guitarist)
- Season 3, 2010–2011: Diego Gutierrez (accordion player)

== Seasons ==
| Season | Year | Rating | Viewers | Share |
|---|---|---|---|---|
| 1st edition | 2008 | 24.3 | 2430000 | S / D |
| 2nd edition | 2009 | 22.5 | 2250000 | 41.9% |
Official data according to IBOPE
