= Resto del mundo =

Resto del Mundo is an Argentine television program, broadcast by El Trece since March 28, 2004, which provides tourist analyzes of places in the world. Produced by the brothers Pablo and Hernán Valenzuela, and hosted by Emilia Attias, RDM has had 17 seasons and 703 episodes, in which it has visited 101 countries and 679 cities.

== History ==
Resto del Mundo is a cultural, travel program that stands out for its modern and avant-garde edition, as well as high quality production. Travel the most remote and eccentric destinations on the planet, showing unparalleled landscapes and historical settings of the world reserved for the chosen ones. Throughout its 17 years, it had several conductors such as Sergio Goycochea, Iván de Pineda, Liz Solari and currently Emilia Attias.

== Awards ==
- 2016 Martín Fierro Award
  - Best cultural program
- 2017 Martín Fierro Award
  - Male driving work (nominees)
- 2019 Fund TV Award
  - Honorable mention (15 years)
- 2020 Fund TV Award
  - General interest - Producers or broadcasters (nominees)
