= Net TV (Argentina) =

Argentine television network

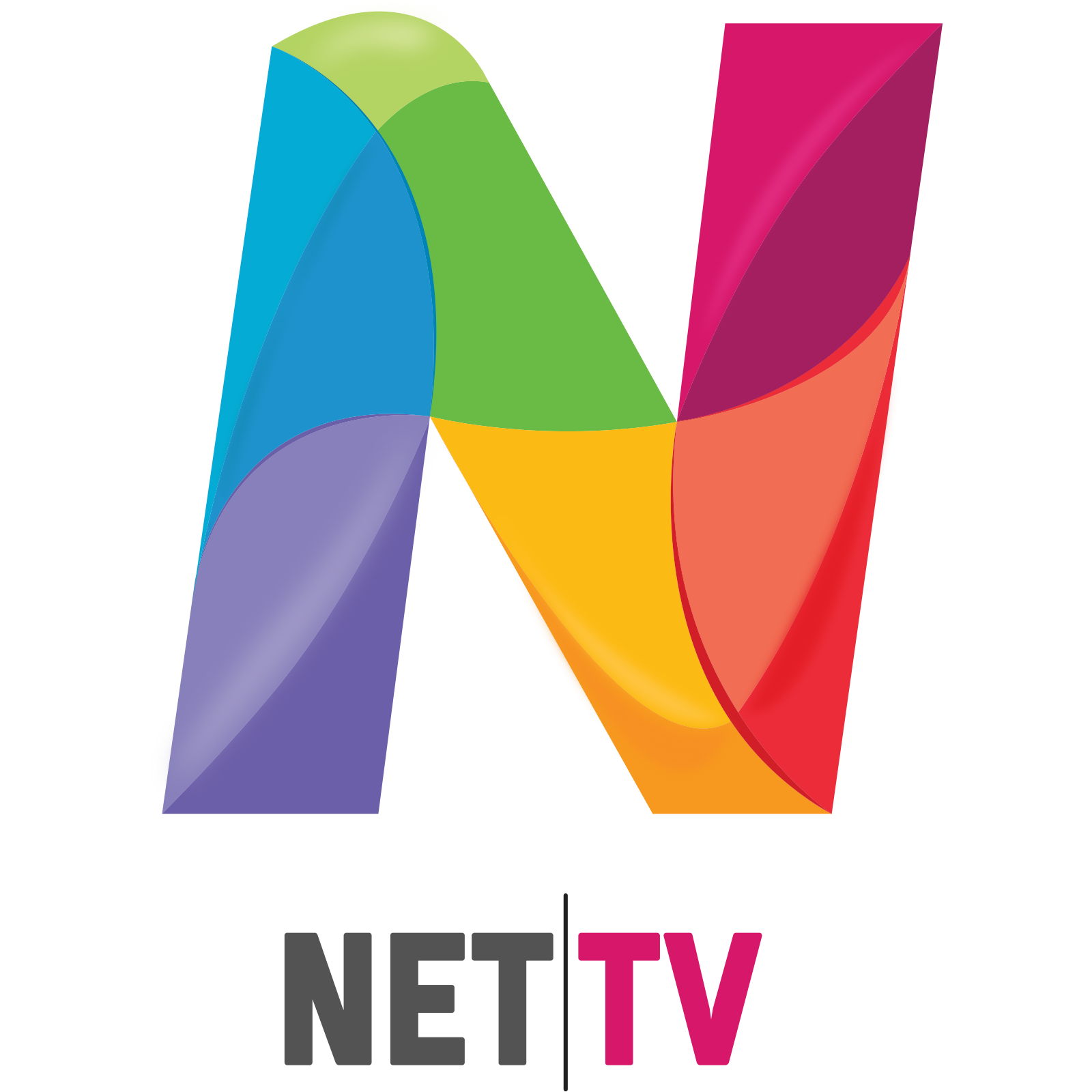
- Buenos Aires; Argentina
- Channels: Digital: 27.2 (UHF)
- Branding: Net TV

Programming
- Language: Spanish

Ownership
- Owner: Grupo Perfil; (Kuarzo Entertainment Argentina)

History
- Founded: 2016; 10 years ago Buenos Aires, 2018; 8 years ago, Argentina
- First air date: October 1, 2018; 8 years ago

Technical information
- Licensing authority: ENACOM

Links
- Website: canalnet.tv

Net TV is an Argentine commercial television network that is property of Grupo Perfil and operated by Kuarzo Entertainment Argentina. The network is headquartered in Barracas, Buenos Aires.

Net TV made its formal debut on October 1, 2018 with the cooking-themed talk show Como Todo, becoming the sixth "must carry" broadcast network of Argentina and the first in 52 years, after the 1966 launch of América TV.

== History ==
Net TV was conceived by Grupo Perfil's founder Jorge Fontevecchia, with the idea to expand the publishing company into audiovisual media. In October 2015, Fontevecchia opened the company's new headquarters in the Barracas neighborhood of Buenos Aires, which were equipped with radio and television studios, and presented to the Federal Authority for Audiovisual Communication Services (AFSCA) a proposal to license new radio and television stations. The original plan included AM and FM radio stations and must carry digital television networks. On September 25, 2015, the proposal was rejected by the AFSCA due to "flaws" in the documentation that was presented.

In 2016, Perfil (together with its partner, local production company Kuarzo Entertainment Argentina) sought the licenses again, and finally obtained them for AM 1190 kHz, FM 101.9 MHz and two digital television channels in the Buenos Aires area through the National Communications Entity (ENACOM) resolutions 1107/16 and 1108/16 published on October 19, 2016, in the State Official Bulletin gazette, to cover the area of Greater Buenos Aires. This is how finally the Grupo Perfil obtained the license for Net TV on digital channel 27.2, Alfa TV on channel 21.1, and Bravo TV on channel 27.1 (these last two still continue with broadcast testing). Due to the nature of its must carry license, all cable television systems must include it on their lineups.

== Programming ==
Net TV began airing original programming on weekdays from 12 p.m. to 12:30 a.m. since launch. The network's first broadcast was the cooking-themed talk show Como Todo, and other programs included talk shows Las Rubias + 1 (moving from KZO Entertainment and hosted by Marcela Tinayre), Chismoses (hosted by Luciana Salazar and Augusto Tartúfoli), Tenemos Wifi (hosted by Nicolás Occhiato and Stefanía Roitman), and Pampita Íntima (hosted by Pampita). Other shows also included reality shows Cuestión de Peso (Argentine adaptation of The Biggest Loser) and Todo por Amor (adapted from For Love or Money and previously known as Por Amor o por Dinero during its first year). During the late-night, overnight and early morning, the network aired a live feed of the inside of the house of the reality Por Amor o por Dinero. On November 26, 2018, the network premiered its first prime time scripted show, the telenovela Millennials. Later that year, dance-themed reality show Cualquiera Puede Bailar premiered as the first show to air original episodes on weekends.

Programming for 2019 included new shows such as talk show Gente Opinando (hosted by Joaquín Álvarez), the game show Pareja o Despareja with Gastón Soffritti and Stefanía Roitman, the return of Pampita Online (hosted by Pampita and moved from KZO Entertainment), news/interview programs Corea del Centro on weeknights, and Periodismo Puro (hosted by Fontevecchia) on Sunday nights. Millennials was renewed for a second season that premiered on June 10, and other Colombian telenovelas such as The Queen of Flow, The Girl, Pablo Escobar, The Drug Lord, and The Mafia Dolls also premiered during the year. Sketch comedy television show Peligro: Sin Codificar moved from Telefe to Net TV and premiered on August 26 in the prime time.

During 2020, telenovelas La Promesa and La Viuda Negra joined the schedule as the new additions. The network has also announced plans to shift toward a more news- and talk-focused schedule in the future.

Now it broadcasts programs and movie blocks on weekends such as: Weekend: Platea de Tickets, Worldplay Sportsnet Uno en Español
