= Cocineros argentinos =

Argentine cooking show

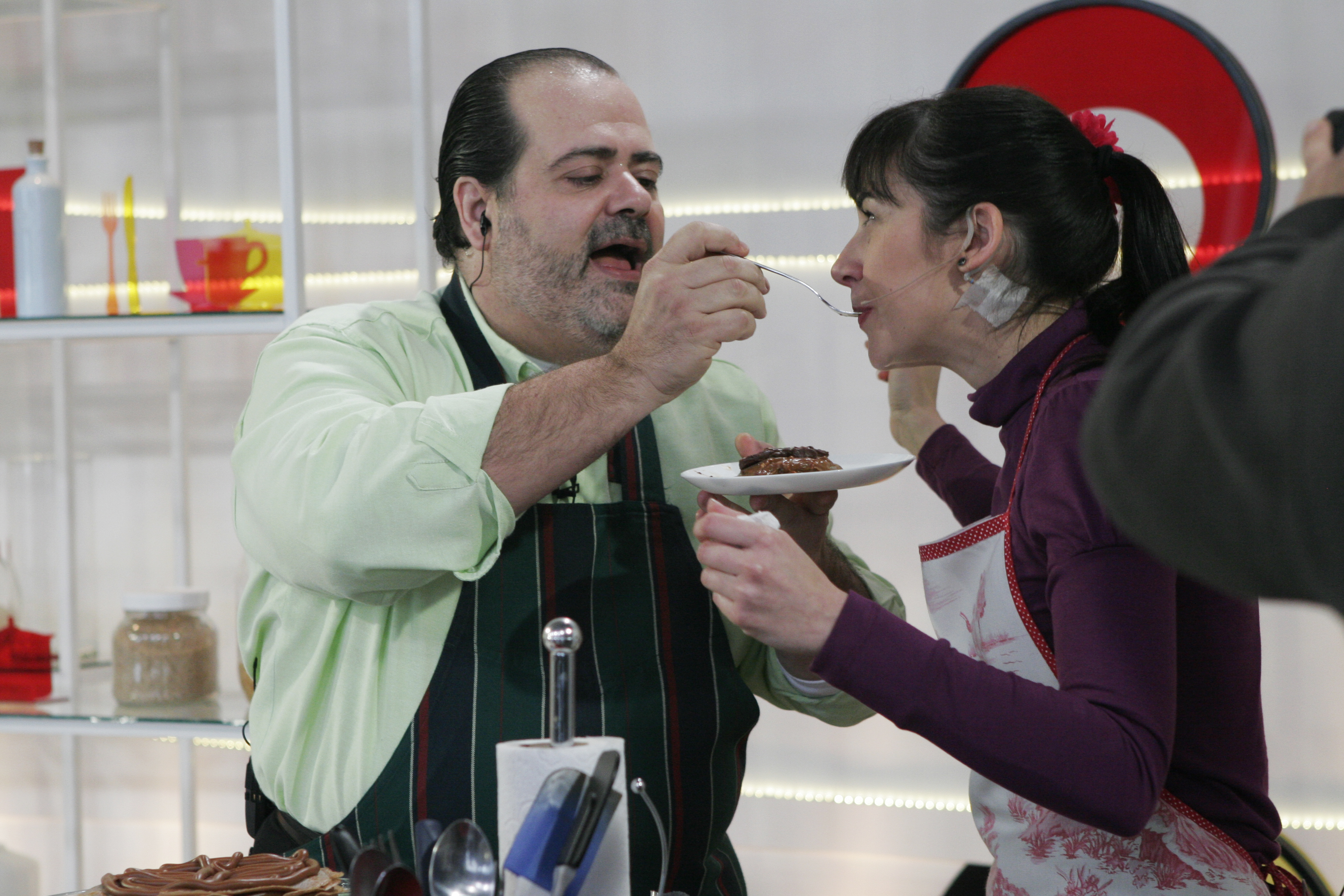
Guillermo Calabrese, TV host of Cocineros argentinos

Cocineros Argentinos (Spanish: Argentine cooks) was an Argentine Cooking show, hosted by Guillermo Calabrese. It was aired at the TV Pública, the public state channel for 16 seasons from January 5, 2009 to March 27, 2024. Despite good ratings and audience, it was cancelled following the adjustments policies of President Milei. It won the 2013 Tato award as best TV program of services.
