= Telenoche =

- Presented by: Nelson Castro (2023–); Dominique Metzger (2023–); Luciana Geuna (2019–2023); María Laura Santillán (2004–2020); Santo Biassati (2004–2017); Diego Leuco (2019–2023)
- Country of origin: Argentina
- Original language: Spanish

Production
- Running time: 60 minutes

Original release
- Network: eltrece
- Release: January 3, 1966

Telenoche is an Argentine television news program. It is broadcast from Mondays to Fridays at 8:00 pm in eltrece channel and it is presented by Nelson Castro and Dominique Metzger.

== History ==
It began broadcasting on January 3, 1966, first at 11:00PM (competing with the Channel 11´s Esso Reporter), but later moved to the traditional timeslot of 8:00PM. The most-known presenters of the bulletin were Mónica Cahen D´Anvers (the first woman in the country who read news in a commercial station) and César Mascetti. Both have retired from television on December 19, 2003, but continued to work at radio. Some important stories delivered by the program, that are well remembered, are stories such as the Moon landing, where Mónica Cahen D´Anvers was sent as a correspondent to Cape Canaveral, the Cordobazo riots in 1969, the first live broadcast from the Falkland Islands one decade later after the 1982 war, and others worldwide. After Mónica and César left the newscast, they were succeeded by María Laura Santillán (investigative reporter) and Santo Biasatti (midday and midnight newsreader) on March 1, 2004. Both were joined by José Antonio "Pepe" Gil Vidal, who replaced Luis Otero as co-presenter. For many years, Channel 13 (now known as eltrece) was the only station who brought news bulletins at 8:00PM, and the other stations chose to carry their reports at 7:00PM. In 2008 Telefe switched its main newscast to the same time to compete with Telenoche. Since May 16, 2011, it is broadcast in high definition.

== New format ==
On June 8, 2015, the newscast premiered a new format, which includes more live reports and investigations about social and political issues, becoming less structured than the other bulletins of the other stations. A main story is presented during the first 20 or 40 minutes, a brief summary of the news follows immediately, and short segments of sport, international news, entertainment news and weather forecast are delivered too. The change of format have reduced the duties of the newsreaders: they almost don't appear on stage and read a few lines during the broadcast, and sometimes they prepare special reports.

== Awards ==
- 2015 Martín Fierro Awards
  - Best TV news program
  - Best news reporter (Mario Massaccesi)

=== Nominations ===
- 2013 Martín Fierro Awards
  - Best TV news program
  - Best news reporter (Julio Bazan)
