= Baglini =

Baglini is an Italian surname. Notable people with the surname include:

- Maurizio Baglini (born 1975), Italian pianist
- Raúl Baglini (1949–2021), Argentine politician

== See also ==
- Baglini theorem
- Baggini
