= Manuel Ugarte (writer) =

Argentine writer and activist (1875–1951)

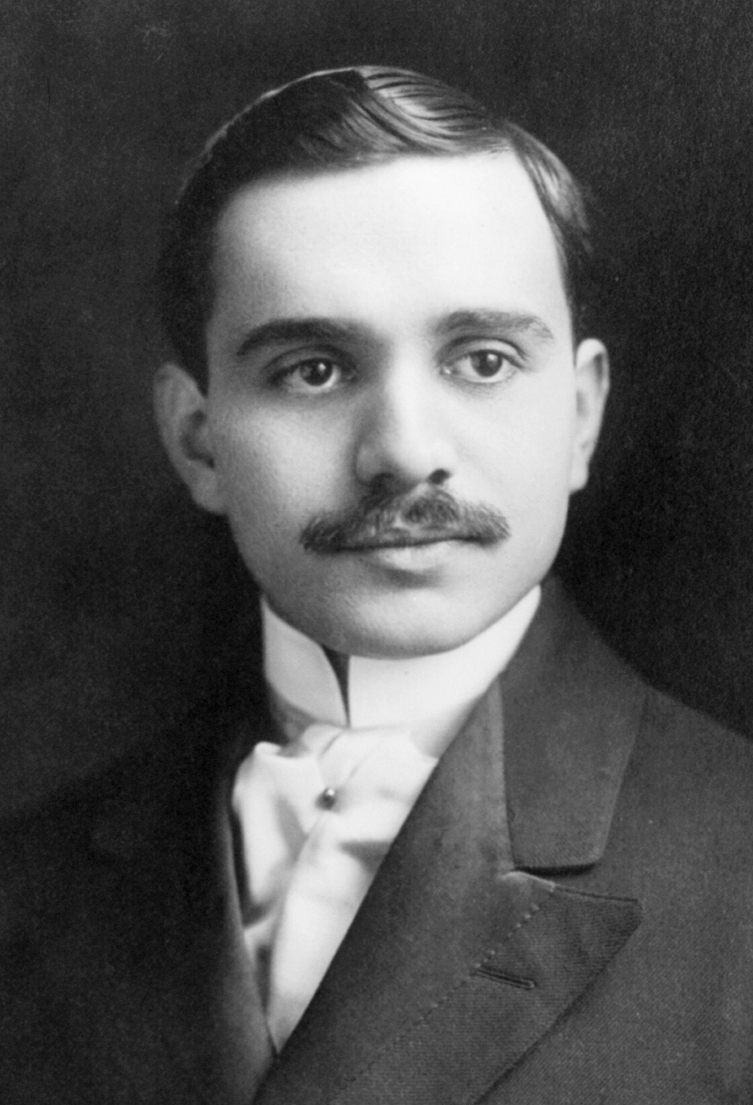
Manuel Ugarte in 1908

Manuel Baldomero Ugarte (27 February 1875 – 2 December 1951) was an Argentine writer, politician, and leader of the Argentine Socialist Party. He served as an ambassador to Mexico, Nicaragua, and Cuba. He advocated for the unity of Hispanic America, and was a supporter of nationalist anti-imperialism and Hispanicism throughout the Americas and Europe.

== Biography ==
Manuel Baldomero Ugarte was born in San José de Flores, now part of the city of Buenos Aires, on 27 February 1875. His father was Floro Ugarte, and his mother was Sabina Rivero. His only brother, Floro Melitón Ugarte, born nine years later than Manuel, was a music composer and director of the famous Colón Theatre in Buenos Aires. His public life began alongside Leopoldo Lugones, Roberto Payró, Alberto Gerchunoff, Manuel Gálvez, and José Ingenieros. He founded La revista literaria, which, among others, published the works of Rubén Darío and Ricardo Jaimes Freyre.

Rubén Darío, Miguel de Unamuno, Delmira Agustini, R. Blanco Fombona, Henri Barbusse, Manuel Gálvez, Haya de la Torre, José Vasconscelos, Blanca Luz Brum, and many others, can be considered his friends and correspondents.

=== Political career ===
Manuel represented the Argentine Socialist Party in various congresses of the Second International organization at the beginning of the 20th century. When he abandoned socialism, he became a fervent neutralist during World War I.

General Perón named him ambassador to Mexico in 1946. He later served as ambassador to Nicaragua and Cuba. These nominations, which came close to his death, were the only recognition he received in his country.

=== Death ===
He lived for many years in Paris and Nice in France, and Valparaíso, Chile. He died in Nice, France in December 1951 from gas asphyxiation.

During his life, he visited every single capital city of Latin America to "get to know the region he has committed his life to defend better." He gave speeches in every country of Ibero-America and in some cities of the United States, Spain, and France.

== Honors ==
A street in the Belgrano neighborhood of Buenos Aires is named after him.

== Publications ==
Among his published books are:

- Cuentos de la Pampa (1903)
- Vendimias juveniles (1907)
- El porvenir de América Latina (1911)
- El destino de un continente (1923)
- El dolor de escribir (1933)
- El naufragio de los Argonautas (1951)
- El dramático destino de una generación
