= Fray Mocho (magazine) =

Argentine weekly magazine

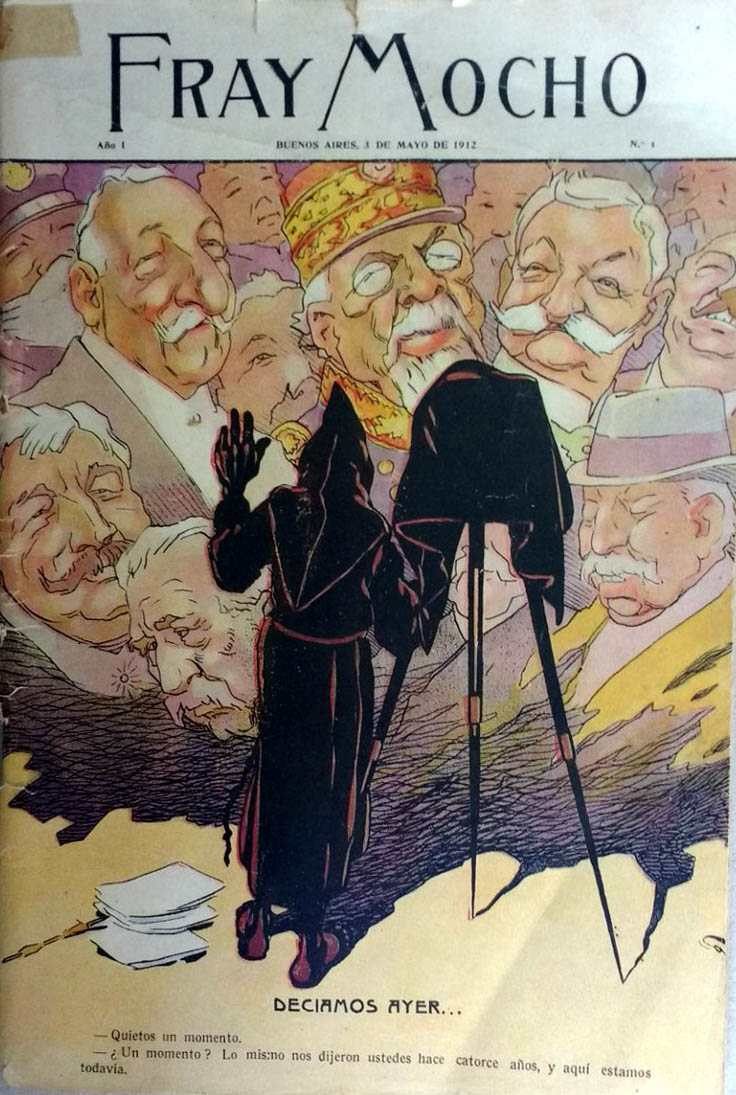
- Cover of Fray Mocho #1 (May 1912). Art by José María Cao
- Categories: Political satire
- Frequency: Weekly
- Format: Magazine
- First issue: May 1912
- Final issue: 1929; 96 years ago
- Country: Argentina
- Language: Spanish

Fray Mocho was an Argentine weekly magazine that published general interest topics. Its first number was published on May 3, 1912, with historian and journalist Carlos Correa Luna being its first director. Fray Mocho's staff included former collaborators of Caras y Caretas who had left the magazine in disagreement with its editorial line.

The magazine was named after José Sixto Álvarez (1858–1903), writer and journalist who was notable for his humorous texts, apart from having been the founder of Caras y Caretas. Fray Mocho published 196 issues until its closure in 1929.

== History ==
The magazine was founded with the purpose of continuing the editorial line of Caras y Caretas that had significantly changed since the death of Sixto Alvarez in 1903. Some of Fray Mocho founders and main collaborators were Carlos Correa Luna, Spanish illustrator José María Cao, writer Luis Pardo (under the pseudonym "Luis García"), Félix Lima, painter Juan Peláez, Czech cartoonist José Friedriech, and artist Juan Hohmann. (Note: Illustrator, painter and lithographer (1880–1955). Creator of popular character "Don Goyo", his work was published in several magazines and newspapers such as Caras y Caretas, Mundo Argentino, El Hogar, La Nación and La Prensa. He also taught pictorial art at the National School of Art "Juan Martín de Pueyrredón" of Buenos Aires.)

Fray Mocho was an alternative to general-interest magazines such as Caras y Caretas or PBT, with an average of 80,000 copies printed. In 1922 the magazine added more articles about classical culture and art, ceasing the use of illustrations on its covers and adding more photographs and paintings until 1929 when it ceased to be published.

The magazine covered a wide range of topics, some of its permanent sections were theatre activities, provinces, women, Montevideo, readers' letters, children's literature, horse racing, other countries' traditions and costumes, and everyday life, among others.

== Visual style ==
Fray Mocho's visual aesthetic had influences of the romanticism and Art Nouveau styles at its first steps, then changing to Art Deco.

The rise of art nouveau in Argentina in the 1900s influenced not only magazines' visual styles but facades of private houses, and was quickly adopted by the middle class. That aesthetic renovation was also visible on typography, illustration and design of Fray Mocho, as well as advertisement, facades of public buildings and even clothing in the Argentine society of that age.

== Notable people ==
- Salvadora Medina Onrubia (1894-1972), Argentine writer
