= Baggini =

Baggini is an Italian surname. Notable people with the surname include:

- Claudio Baggini (1936–2015), Italian Roman Catholic bishop
- Julian Baggini (born 1968), British philosopher, journalist, and author

== See also ==
- Baglini
- Maggini (surname)
