= Argentina/12 =

Argentine news channel

- Country: Argentina
- Broadcast area: Argentina

Programming
- Language: Spanish (Rioplatense dialect)
- Picture format: 1080i HDTV (downscaled to 576i/480i for the SD feed)

Ownership
- Owner: Telearte S.A.
- Parent: Grupo Octubre
- Sister channels: El Nueve

History
- Launched: 17 October 2020; 6 years ago

Links
- Website: www.pagina12.com.ar/argentina12/

Availability

Terrestrial
- Over-the-air: Channel 24.5

Argentina/12 (stylized Argentina|12) is an Argentine news channel owned by Grupo Octubre. Launched on 17 October 2020 as Información Periodística (IP), it was renamed under its current name on 12 November 2025, to create a synergy between sister newspaper Página 12 and all-news radio station Radio AM 750. The channel broadcasts on a national TDA multiplex on channel 24.5.

== History ==
=== Background ===
On 13 July 2020, Pablo Montagna announced the launch of Grupo Octubre's news channel project; the group is owned by businessman and labor leader Víctor Santa María, produced at El Nueve's studios. With the launch of IP (Información Periodística), Grupo Octubre sought to create a hybrid between C5N (owned by Grupo Indalo) and TN (owned by Grupo Clarín). Santa María told in an interview to La Nación that there was going to be "no political contamination" and "no editorialized content, like what we have at Página/12 or AM 750".

=== Información Periodística ===
IP (Información Periodística) began at 8pm on 17 October 2020, with its unaugural presenters being Diego Iglesias, Noelia Barral Grigera and Gabriel Sued. Its goal was to "bring back news to the center [of it]". It launched on the digital terrestrial platform on a national multiplex on LCN 24.5 in standard definition. On 17 July 2021, the channel launched on Telecentro.

The channel made changes to its branding on 20 March 2023, becoming IP Noticias.

=== New management ===
On 30 August 2024, the channel experimented significant change. Grupo Octubre announced that IP Noticias had been acquired by a group of investors led by Ariel García, owner of food conglomerate 3 Arroyos. Alfredo Scoccimarro was appointed its new director-general.

On 17 October 2024, its fourth anniversary, the channel overhauled its identity, adopting a more classical aesthetic; then on 4 November, it introduced its new schedule, with more live coverage, mobile units and correspondents.

On 17 February 2025, IP Noticias introduced a new schedule and started airing 24-hour live coverage.

On 31 May 2025, IP Producciones SAS discarded its management contract due to judicial causes that hit businessman Ariel García, who was supposed to leave his post. On 1 June, IP issued an announcement saying that the channel would be managed in its entirety by Grupo Octubre again, announced in a brief footnote in its usual schedule.

On 4 June 2025, the announcement of the return of operations began, scheduled for the following day, after the operative restructuring. The new phase was expected to be led by Marcelo Antin y Diego Toni, who became directors.

=== Argentina/12 ===
On 12 November 2025, the channel was relaunched as Argentina/12 (Ar/12). The change was part of a Grupo Octubre synergy strategy with Página 12 (with which it based upon its new identity) and AM 750, seeking to capitalize on its ratings and consolidate a combined editorial line.

Unlike IP's original intention of delivering "news without political contamination", its new directors, Marcelo Antin and Diego Toni, stated at Ar/12's launch that "it won't be a washed-up news channel" and that they have "the duty and obligation of delivering a serious interpretation of things".

The relaunch included the addition of figures such as Víctor Hugo Morales, Mariana Contartessi and Luciana Rubinska, alongside programs such as Redacción Página 12 with Leandro Renou and classic Nuevediario editions. On weekends, the schedule includes repeats and simulcasts of selected El Nueve programming.

== Controversies ==
=== Firing of Melina Fleiderman and conflict (2023) ===
On 25 July 2023, journalist Melina Fleiderman publicly condemned her firing from the channel on her Instagram profile. She argumented that the decision was motivated because of her entrance to the newly-launched Extra TV news channel, owned by Franco Bindi, and for rejecting pressure from IP's then-news manager, Gerardo Foia Caruso.

=== Resignation of Gerardo Foia Caruso (2023) ===
On 28 July 2023, Gerardo Foia Caruso presented his resignation as director-general of IP Noticias, as fallout from the criticism generated by the Melina Fleiderman case, which led to changes to the channel's director structure.

=== Criticism against Javier Milei for fake news (2023) ===
On 29 October 2023, in the context of the general election, IP Noticias reported on X that then-presidential candidate Javier Milei had disseminated misinformation. According to the report, Milei shared unfounded accusations against journalist Agustín Rossi, based on a fake account that used the channel's logo and graphics to spread fake news.

=== Attack to the IP Noticias team in Constitución (2024) ===
On 22 November 2024, the IP Noticias team, consisting of journalist Valentina Blasón and cameraman Sebastián Riego, were hit with bottles while covering a violent confrontation in the Constitución neighborhood of Buenos Aires. The fact happened while they were documenting a machete fight between two people. Unknown people attacked the channel's mobile unit and put the equipment at risk.

=== Damage to an IP camreaman at Casa Rosada (2024) ===
On 10 December 2024, during the coverage of the first anniversary of Javier Milei's presidency, IP Noticias cameraman Jorge Occhiuzzi was damaged in front of Casa Rosada. According to a report from the channel, Occhiuzzi was physically assaulted by a supported identified with the libertarian movement while doing his job. The aggression included beating, militante identificado con el movimiento libertario mientras realizaba su trabajo. La agresión incluyó golpes, scratches and insultes like "zuedo" (lefty). The incident generated wide condemnation and was seen as an attack to freedom of the press.
