= Gaspar Besares-Soraire =

Argentine painter

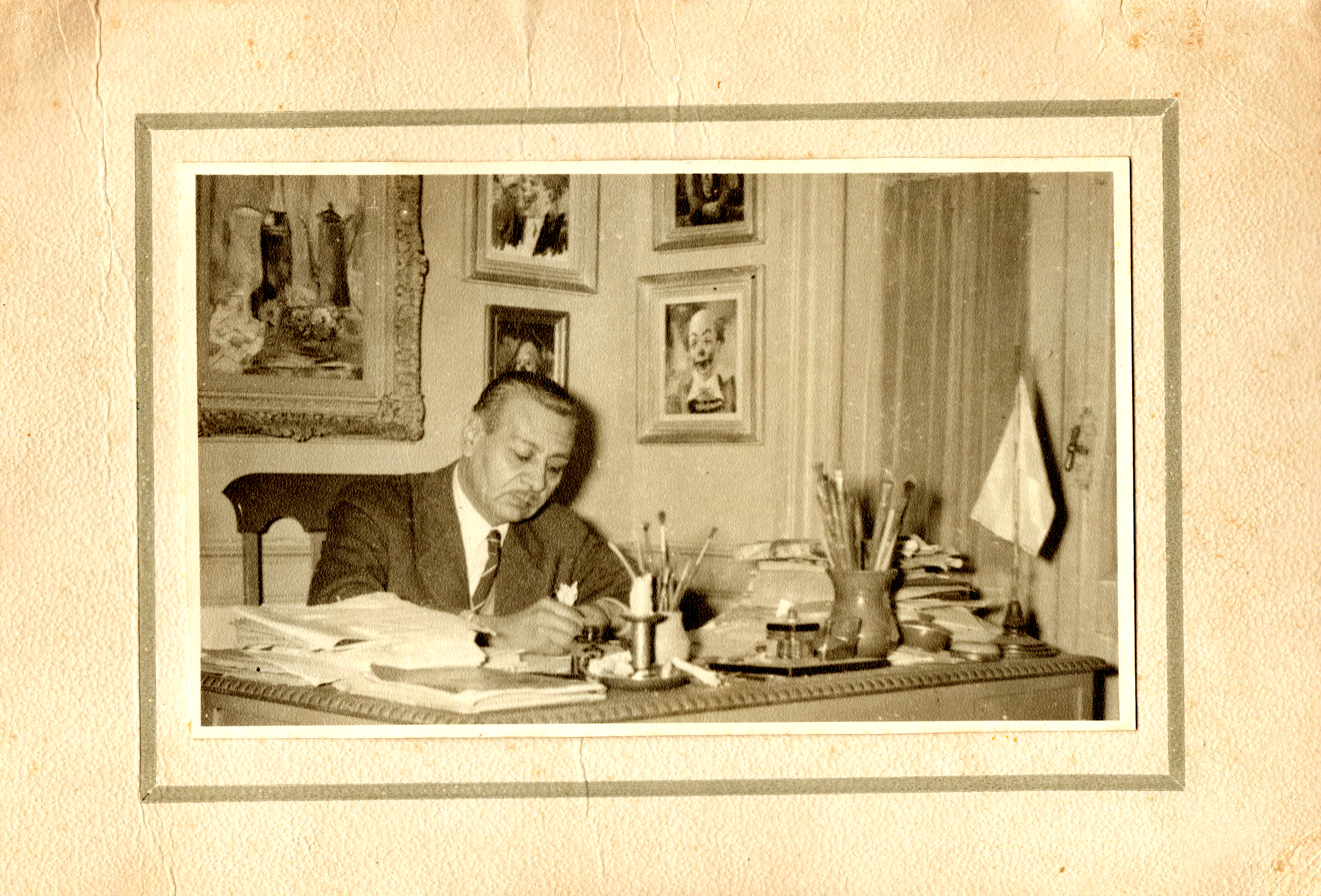
The artist in his studio in Buenos Aires in the 1940s.

Gaspar Besares-Soraire (La Banda, Santiago del Estero, 1900-Buenos Aires, 1984) was an Argentine painter, draughtsman, sculptor and professor of some renown during the first half of the 20th century.

Amongst his notable works are La Salamanca (part of the collection of the Legislatura de la Ciudad Autónoma de Buenos Aires) and his illustrations in the historical political satire magazine Caras y Caretas.

By donating 38 paintings, sculptures and engravings, he helped found the first art museum in his native city.
