= Maggini =

Maggini may refer to:

- Maggini (surname)
- Maggini (crater) on Mars
- Maggini Quartet, a British string quartet
- "Maggini violins", those made by master craftsman Giovanni Paolo Maggini
