= Julio Nudler =

Argentine economic journalist

- Born: December 16, 1941
- Died: July 27, 2005 (aged 63)
- Occupation: economic journalist

Julio Nudler (16 December 1941 – 27 July 2005) was an Argentine economic journalist.

Nudler wrote for La Opinión, Clarín and La Razón before he became head of the economics section of Página/12 in 1990. In 2004 an article, in which he impeached Alberto Fernández who was the chief of the cabinet of Néstor Kirchner with corruption allegations, was not published by Página/12. Nudler condemned this as censorship and also accused his colleague Horacio Verbitsky of defending the government.

Nudler died due to lung cancer on 27 July 2005. He was buried in the San Isidro Cemetery
