= Página 12 =

Daily newspaper based in Argentina

- Front page from April 12, 2011.
- Type: Daily newspaper
- Format: Tabloid
- Owner: Grupo Octubre
- Founder(s): Jorge Lanata; Osvaldo Soriano, Alberto Elizalde Leal
- Publisher: Editorial La Página S.A.
- Editor-in-chief: Víctor Santa María
- Editor: Mario Wainfeld; Eduardo Aliverti; Rodrigo Fresán; Irina Hauser; Adrián Paenza; Raúl Kollmann; Mariana Carbajal
- Founded: 26 May 1987
- Political alignment: Progressivism; Kirchnerism
- Language: Spanish
- Headquarters: Buenos Aires, Argentina
- Circulation: 51,000
- Website: pagina12.com.ar

Página 12 (sometimes stylised as Página/12, Página|12 or Página12) is a newspaper published in Buenos Aires, Argentina. It was founded on 25 May 1987 by journalists Jorge Lanata and Ernesto Tiffenberg.

Its first president was businessman Fernando Sokolowicz, in 1994 Grupo Clarín supposedly owned a share. The publishers also distribute a supplement covering Rosario area news, Rosario 12, since 1991. Since 2016 the newspaper is property of Grupo Octubre, a multimedia company created by Víctor Santa María, president of the Justicialist Party in the Buenos Aires.

According to in-house surveys, 58% of the newspaper's readership is between 18 and 52 years old and belong to the medium and medium high socio economic groups: AB and C1/C2.

== History ==
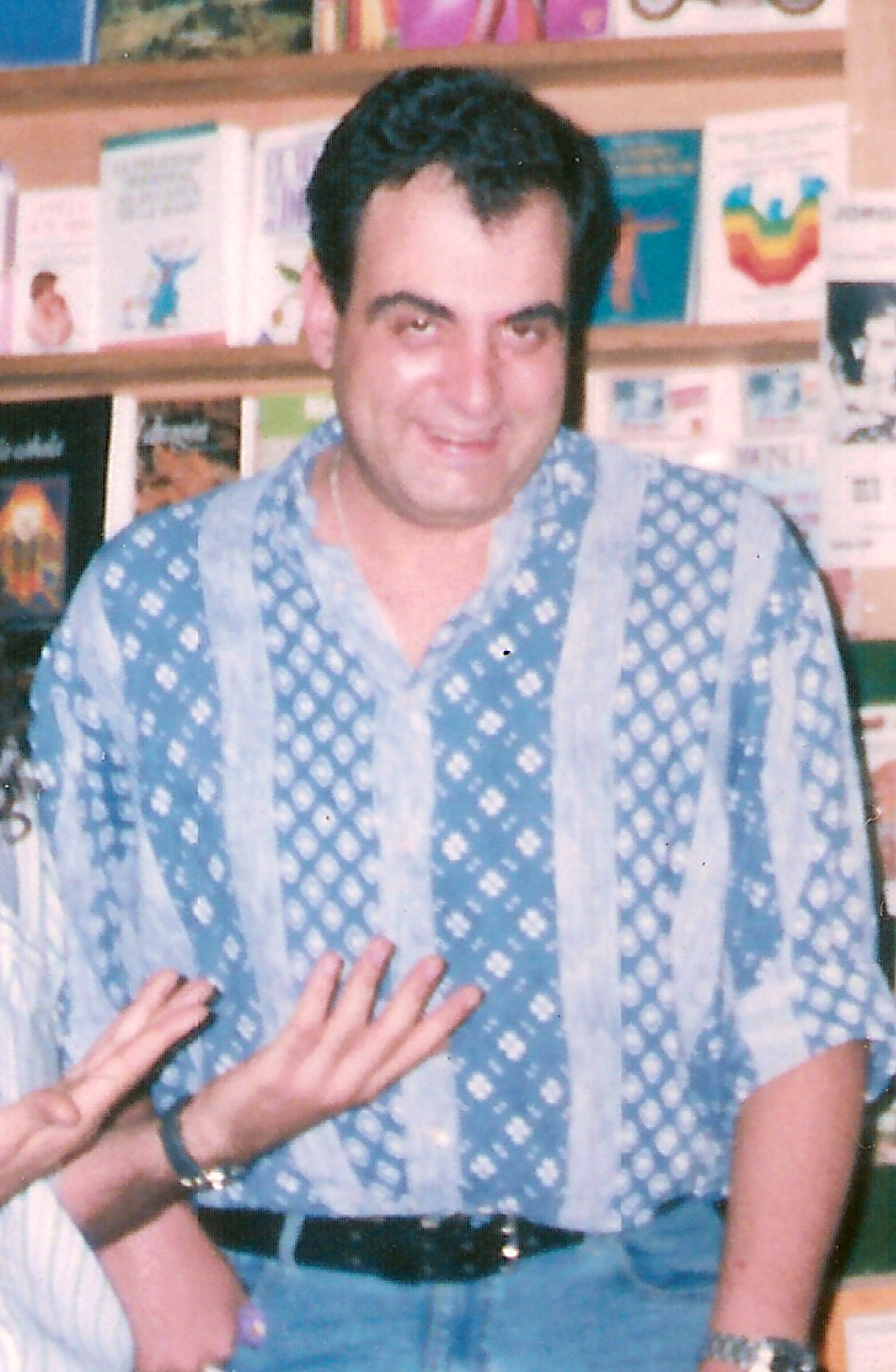
Jorge Lanata, founder of the newspaper, in 1994

The name of the paper comes from the fact that its preliminary editions as it was being developed had 12 pages. The name had already been chosen, thus the publishers opted to reserve the twelfth page for reports or news stories of central importance. Another version holds that the paper was going to be called "Reporter" but when the owners went to register the name, they were told that the name was taken. They then decided to count the number of pages in order to choose a name.

With a stark design, a daily circulation of 10,000 copies and a size of 16 pages that doubled within a few weeks, the paper was a sharp contrast with other Argentinian newspapers due to its progressive orientation, its in-depth articles (each one occupying more than a page on average) and rich analysis. Inspired by the French paper Libération, its style contrasted with the conventional Argentine press, where a higher priority was placed on showcasing a wide variety of information as opposed to more probing reports.

The editorial staff included journalists such as Horacio Verbitsky, writers Tomás Eloy Martínez, Osvaldo Soriano and José María Pasquini Durán, Juan Gelman, Eduardo Galeano, Osvaldo Bayer, Rodrigo Fresán, Alan Pauls, Juan Forn, Eduardo Berti, Ernesto Tenembaum, Homero Alsina Thevenet, José Pablo Feinmann, María O'Donnell, Juan Sasturain Miguel Repiso (Rep) who since the release of first edition has been in charge of illustrating the back cover and various sections of the paper, have been regular contributors. The first manager was Jorge Lanata, later replaced by Ernesto Tiffenberg.

Lanata stated in a 2007 interview that Rudy Ulloa–a businessman close to former President Néstor Kirchner–also owned a share.

The newspaper had a close relation with the governments of Néstor and Cristina Kirchner, and received huge amounts of state advertising as a result. Cristina Kirchner made a speech during the 25th anniversary of the foundation of the newspaper in 2012, praising the editorial line, journalists and authorities. She said that "there is a true cultural battle. We'll keep fighting in all fields, and Página 12 too. They will only defeat us when we cease to fight". She made reference to a conspiracy theory, frequent in the Relato K, that considers that the Kirchners were attacked by a cabal of hegemonic groups.

The newspaper was bought by Víctor Santa María, president of the Justicialist Party in the Buenos Aires city, and president of the SUTERH union. Santa María had used the union funding to start the "Octubre" group, which also includes the newspaper Diario Z, the magazines Caras y Caretas and Planeta urbano as well as two radio stations.

== Editorial stance ==
Página 12 is one of the most popular newspapers in Argentina, being the fourth most visited portal in the news area. Since its founding, it was an alternative newspaper that sought to be progressive and analytical. It has been described as a leftist newspaper.

Clarín described the newspaper as Kirchnerist. In an interview with the tabloid Perfil, Página 12's newly-established owner Víctor Santa María said that the newspaper formerly criticized and supported the Kirchnerist governments, ensuring that the newspaper did not participate in "militant journalism". He also said the paper was critical of president Mauricio Macri and considered media independence and journalistic objectivity nonexistent in Argentine media, stating that some media are "more objective than others."

Beyond presenting the news, Página 12 has revealed various scandals at the time, maintaining a critical stance against the government and corruption, which has resulted in various awards.

== Controversies ==
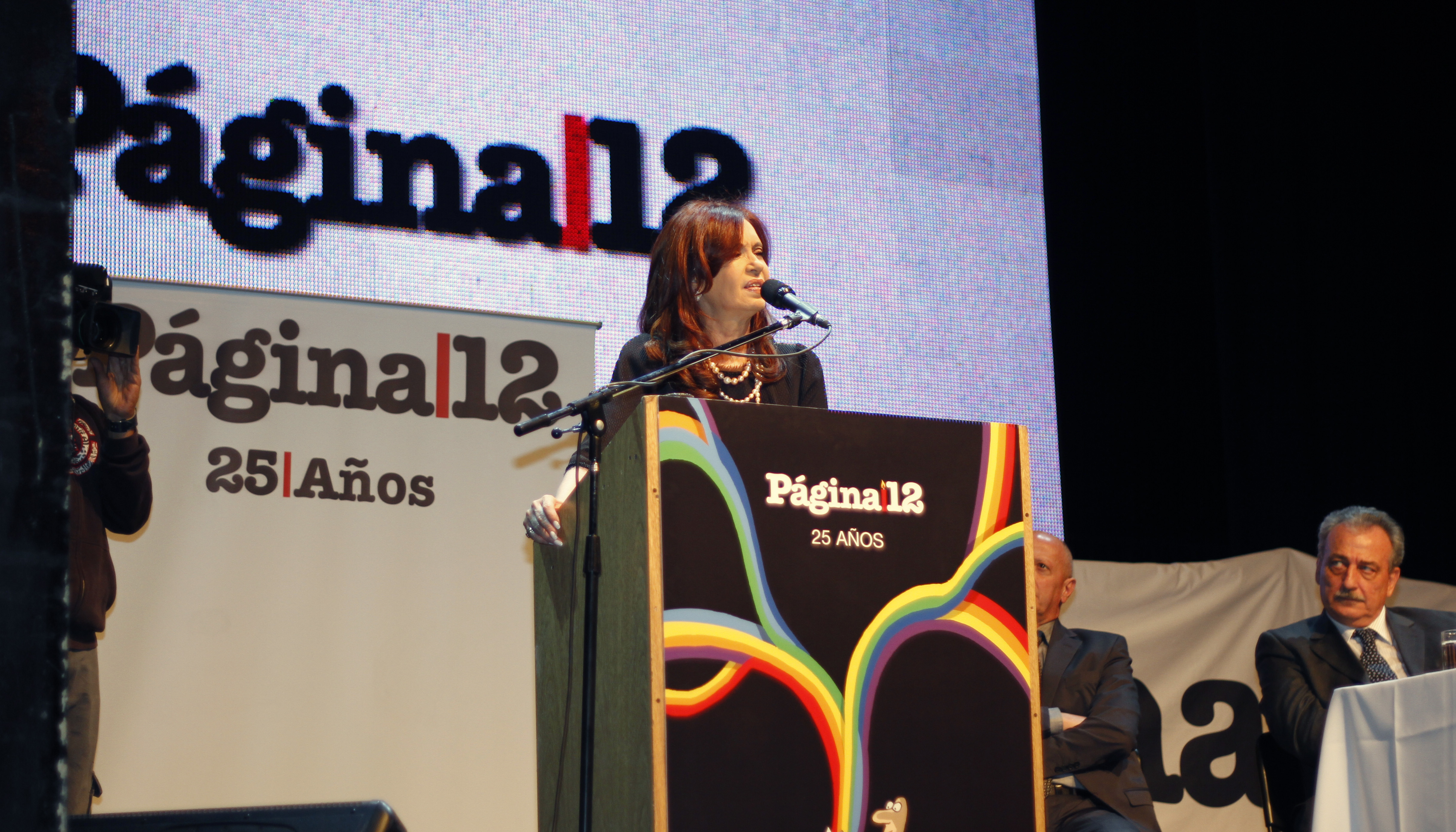
President Cristina Fernández de Kirchner, during the 25th anniversary of the newspaper

When Julio Nudler, who was the head of the economic department of Página 12, impeached the chief of the Kirchner cabinet with corruption allegations in 2004 the directorate of Página 12 refused to publish an article of Nudler. Nudler accused Página 12 of censorship and the article was finally published, with an added note from his colleague Horacio Verbitsky stating that some of the data in the article was wrong. In 2009, the paper gave Osvaldo Bayer limitless space to promote his views on an attack by anarchist students on an Israel Day parade, focusing on conspiracy theorizing that a "Hebrew-speaking group" had committed the attacks and framed the students, while demanding illogically that Israel's Ambassador to Argentina withdraw the charges against them (since he wasn't a witness to the attacks and didn't make any arrests for ask for charges, let alone file any). The paper ignored the students being convicted nearly en masse and receiving prison terms.

When Jorge Bergoglio was elected as Pope Francis, Página 12 published renewed allegations about his actions during the Dirty War. However, due to the Pope's popularity in Argentina, Cristina Kirchner made what the political analyst Claudio Fantini called a "Copernican shift" in her relations with him and fully embraced the Francis phenomenon. Página 12 later removed their controversial articles about Bergoglio, written by Horacio Verbitsky, from their web page, as a result of this change.

A 2012 comic strip titled "An Adventure of David Gueto" featured a parody of a DJ, asking the prisoners of a Nazi concentration camp to dance, and a caricature of Adolf Hitler approved the idea, adding that "if they are relaxed, you get a better soap". Sergio Widder, director for Latin America office of the Simon Wiesenthal Center, said: "This so-called parody is beyond offensive. As a newspaper that has been a champion for human rights and fight against racism since its foundation, we expect the editors of Página 12 to immediately and publicly apologize for this distortion of history. Página 12 'Young Culture' section would better serve its youthful readers by teaching them the importance of preserving the memory of the Nazi genocide through remembrance, education and prevention of human rights violations". The newspaper issued an apology afterwards.

In July 2017, Aerolíneas Argentinas ceased distribution of the Página 12 newspapers on their planes. They argued that the newspaper had a debt on the payment for this distribution since the previous year. ADEPA voiced their concern, and asked both parts to find a satisfactory solution.

The Polish League Against Defamation, linked to Polish president Andrzej Duda, sued Página 12 in 2018 for an article about the Jedwabne pogrom, with the Polish organization citing the Amendment to the Act on the Institute of National Remembrance. President of the Asociación Mutual Israelita Argentina (AMIA) criticized the lawsuit, stating it was "an abominable act of censorship and undermines the debate over historically proven data."

== Awards ==
In 2007, Casa América Catalunya, directed by the governments of Spain, Barcelona and Catalunya, gave Página 12 his annual prize for Freedom of expression for its "rigor and professionalism" placed at the service of justice and human rights" through hands of Spaniard musician Joan Manuel Serrat who said: "I think we are in this situation that often occurs in which those of us who participate knows perfectly what is happening, which is so important that it fills us with pride and is part of our memory, but outsiders don't really know. We must transmit this to others, transmitting what is Página 12, what these journalists of Argentina have done, those who made Página 12 possible and made other newspapers and publications possible, sometimes at risk of his own life"

== See also ==
- Argentina/12, an Argentine television news channel
