= Baglini theorem =

In Argentina, the Baglini theorem is a concept which maintains that the degree of irresponsibility of the proposals of a party or political leader is inversely proportional to their possibilities of accessing power. It was stated in 1986 by Raúl Baglini, then deputy of the Unión Cívica Radical.

There are also some variants of the theorem, namely:

- The further away one is from power, the more irresponsible the political statements are; the closer they get, the more sensible and reasonable they become.
- As a group approaches power, it softens its positions critical positions towards the government.
- Politicians' convictions are inversely proportional to their proximity to power.
- The closer to power it is, the more conservative a political group becomes.
- The closer a politician gets to power, the further he moves away from fulfilling his campaign promises.

Baglini's expressions were summarized as a "theorem" by the journalist Horacio Verbitsky.

== Precedents ==
"Idealism increases in direct proportion to one’s distance from the problem". — John Galsworthy

== See also ==
- Theories of political behavior
