= Caras y Caretas (Argentina) =

Argentine magazine

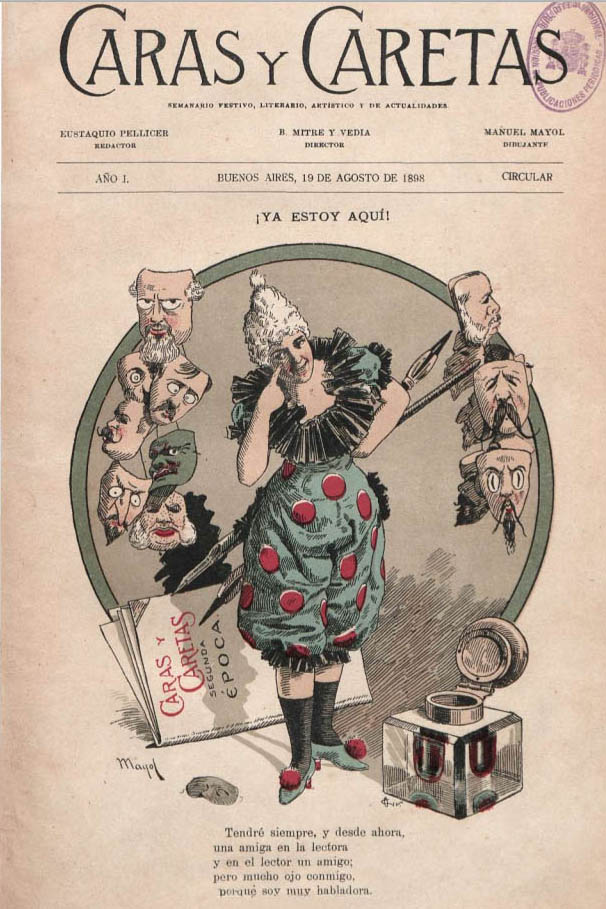
- Cover to the n° 1 (1898), art by Manuel Mayol.
- Categories: Political satire
- Frequency: Weekly
- Publisher: Bartolomé Mitre y Vedia (1898–?); Felipe Pigna (2005–present)
- Paid circulation: 29,000 (2008)
- Founder: José S. Álvarez
- Founded: 1898
- First issue: 1898 (1st era); 2005 (2nd era)
- Final issue: 1941 (1st era)
- Company: Grupo Octubre (current)
- Country: Argentina
- Language: Spanish
- Website: carasycaretas.org.ar

Caras y Caretas is a weekly magazine of Argentina published from 1898 to 1941 in its first period of existence. There was a previous version published in Uruguay between 1890 and 1897. Caras y Caretas was relaunched in 2005 under the direction of historian Felipe Pigna, having been published since then.

== History ==
The Caras y Caretas was founded in Montevideo in 1890. Its main features were political satire, humour and topical issues, visually displayed through cartoons and photographs. Eustaquio Pellicer (associated with French artist Charles Schütz) was the director since its first number (dated 20 July 1890) until #144. At the invitation of Argentine journalist Bartolomé Mitre Vedia, Pellicer moved to Buenos Aires, establishing the Argentine edition of the magazine there. The first number (released 19 August 1898) had 24 pages.

Caras y Caretas was very popular during its first years of existence, with Mitre y Vedia as director, Pellicer as writer and Spanish artist Manuel Mayol as artist, doing most of the covers and interior illustrations for the magazine. José Sixto Alvarez (mostly known for its nickname Fray Mocho) was one of the most frequent collaborators from 1898 until his death in 1903. Since 1924 Caras y Caretas published short tales from local writers, such as Roberto Payró, Arturo Capdevila, Carrizo and Gálvez.

Some of the prestigious cartoonists that worked for the magazine were Manuel Mayol, Julio Málaga Grenet, José María Cao Luaces, Lino Palacio (who published his first work in the magazine in 1912), Jorge Argerich, Dante Quinterno, Alejandro Sirio, Hermenegildo Sábat Lleó, among others.

Uruguayan writer Horacio Quiroga published his first tales in Caras y Caretas. Quiroga not only wrote short tales but film reviews.

In 1941 Caras y Caretas ceased to be published although the magazine would have two brief revivals in 1953 and 1982. In 1982 the magazine had a brief stint during the Malvinas Islands War. Some of the artists gave their contributions to the magazine were Miguel Rep, Gerardo Canelo, Enrique Pinti, Geno Díaz, and writers Oscar Bevilacqua, Fermín Chávez, Miguel Grinberg, Marco Denevi, Bernardo Kordon, Roberto Mero, Helvio Botana, Eugenio Mandrini and Jorge Claudio Morhain.

During months of October and November 2004 the Illustration Museum of Buenos Aires held an exhibition named "Caras y Caretas: its illustrators" in the National Library, where about 150 original pieces by more than 40 artists were exhibited. A second event was held in 2006 in the Feria del Libro of Buenos Aires.

In July 2005 a relaunch of Caras y Caretas was released, directed by historian Felipe Pigna and published by "Fundación Octubre", a company of Suterh, the union of building workers of Argentina. The first number of the new era was a success, selling the total of 50,000 copies put into circulation. By 2008 Caras y Caretas sold an average of 29,000 copies per week.

== Gallery ==
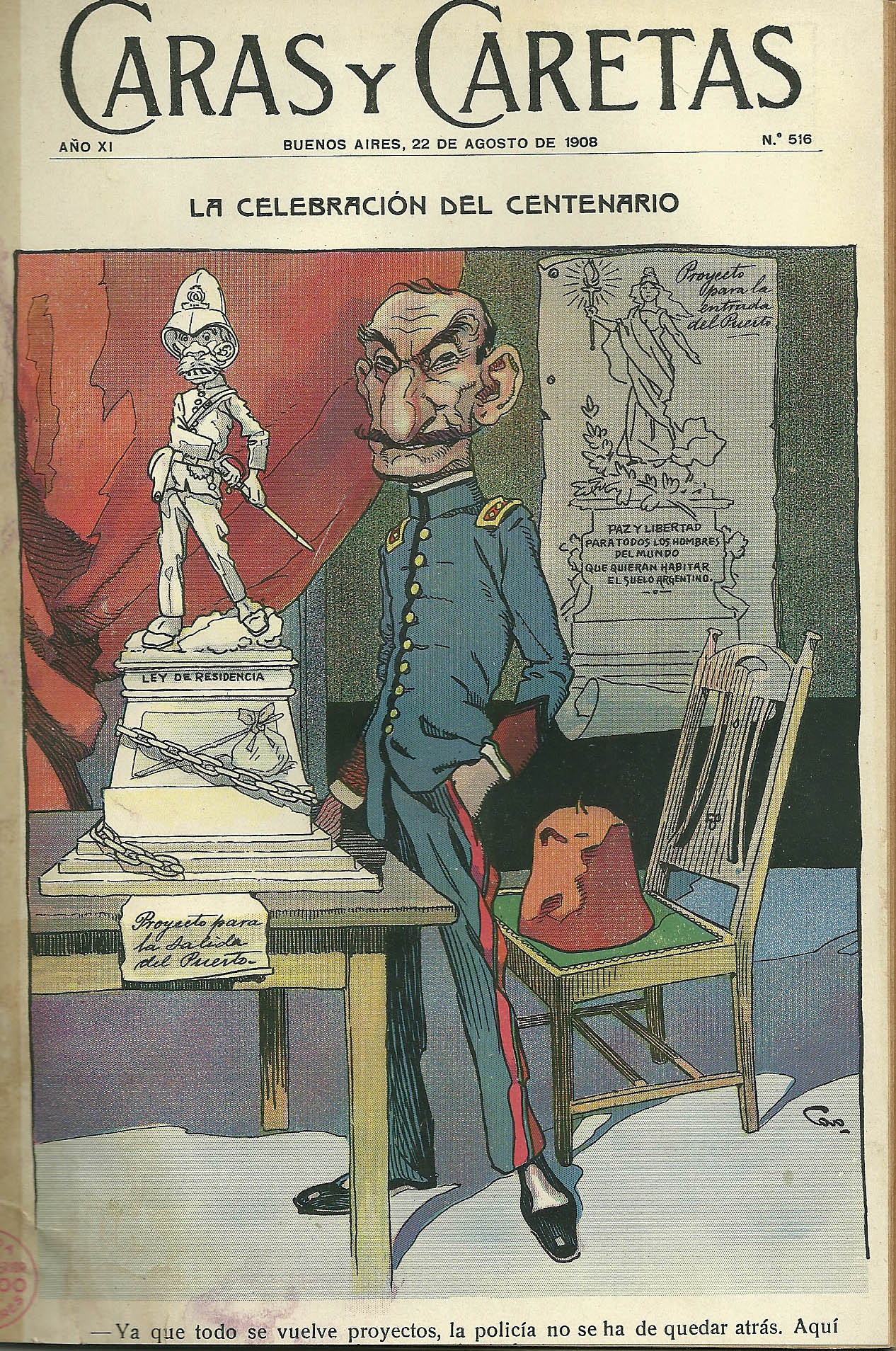

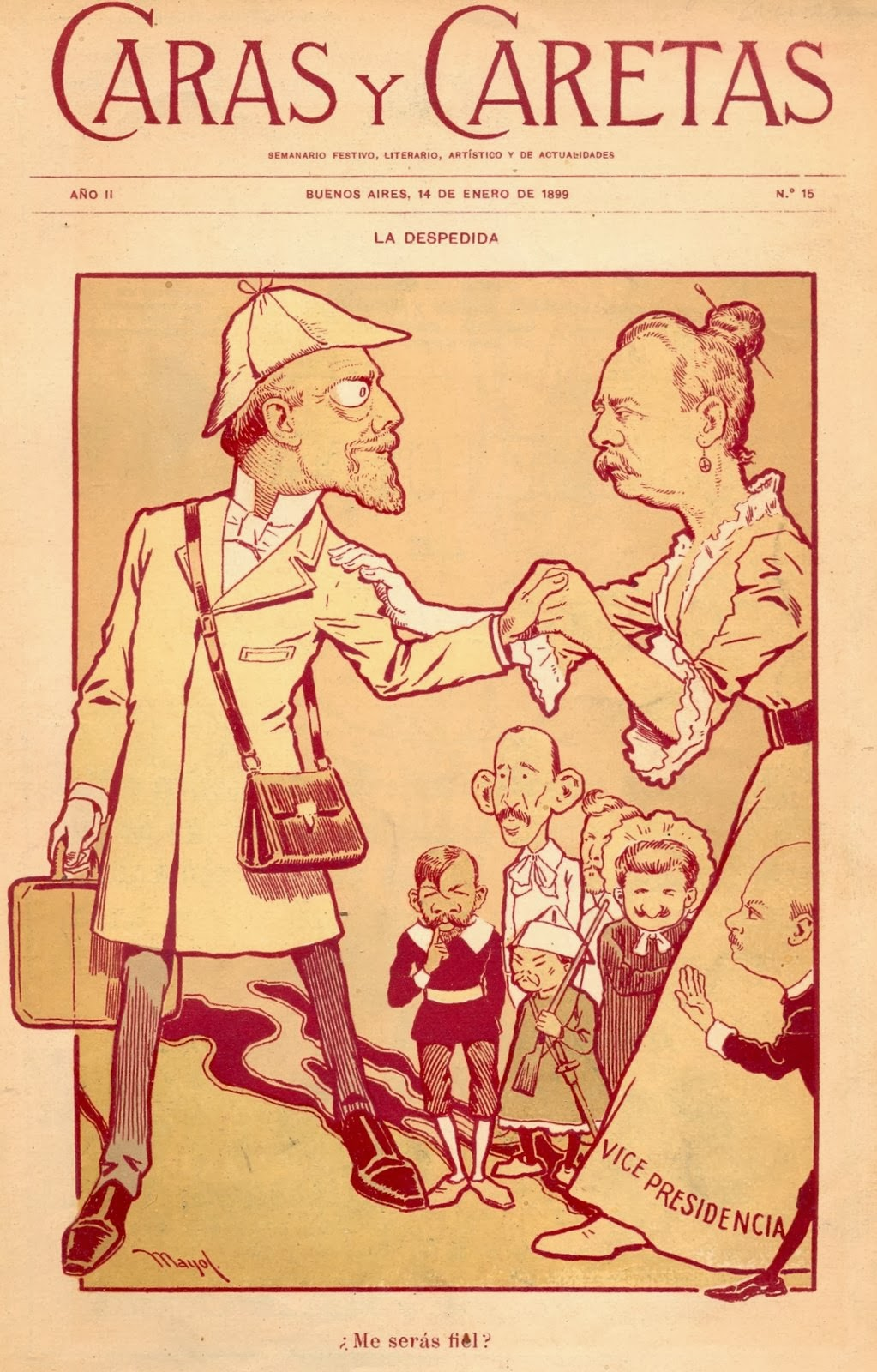

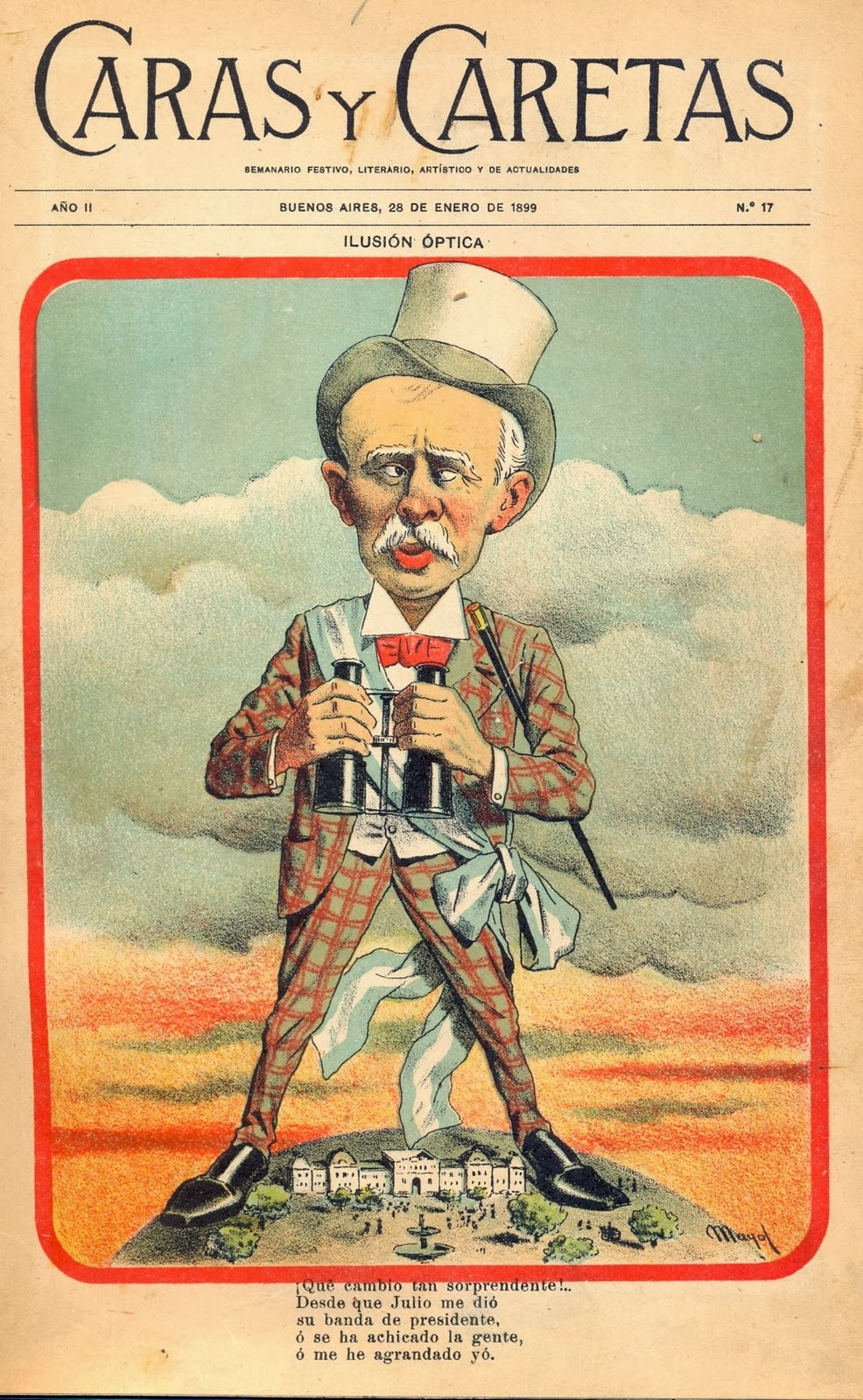

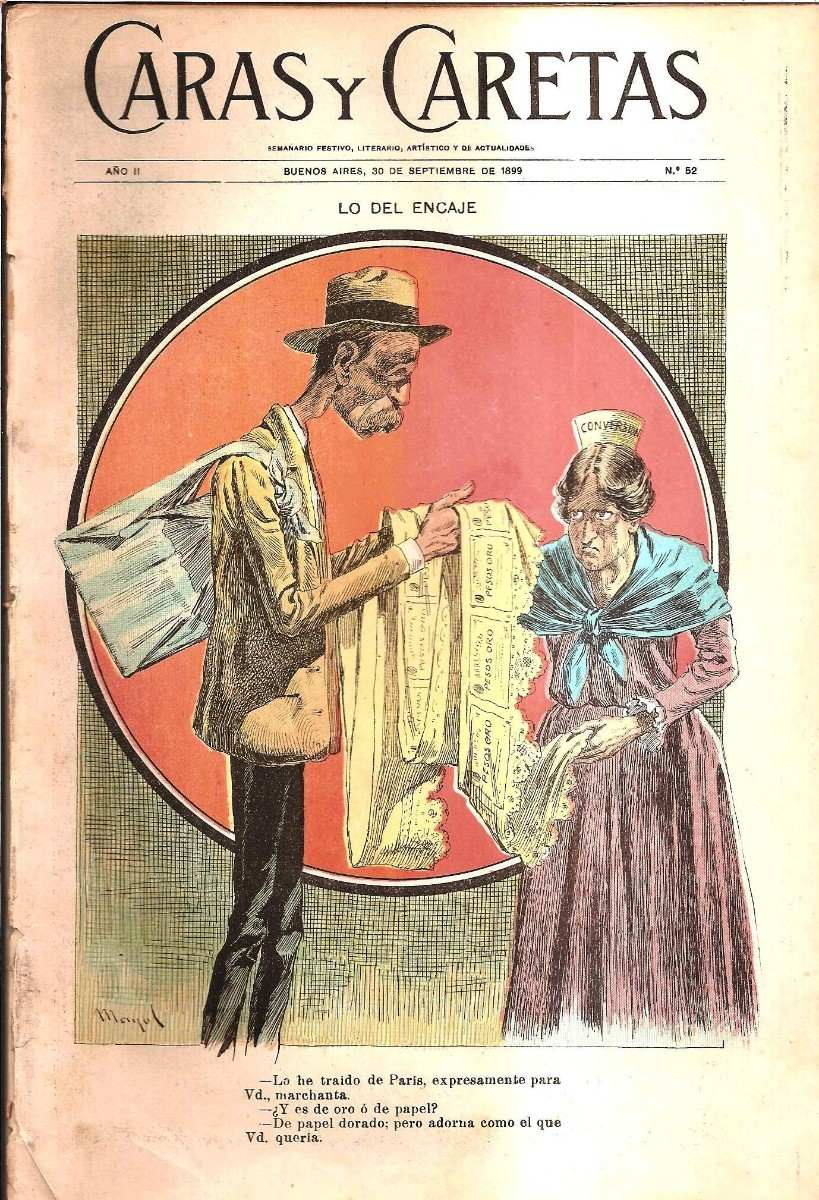

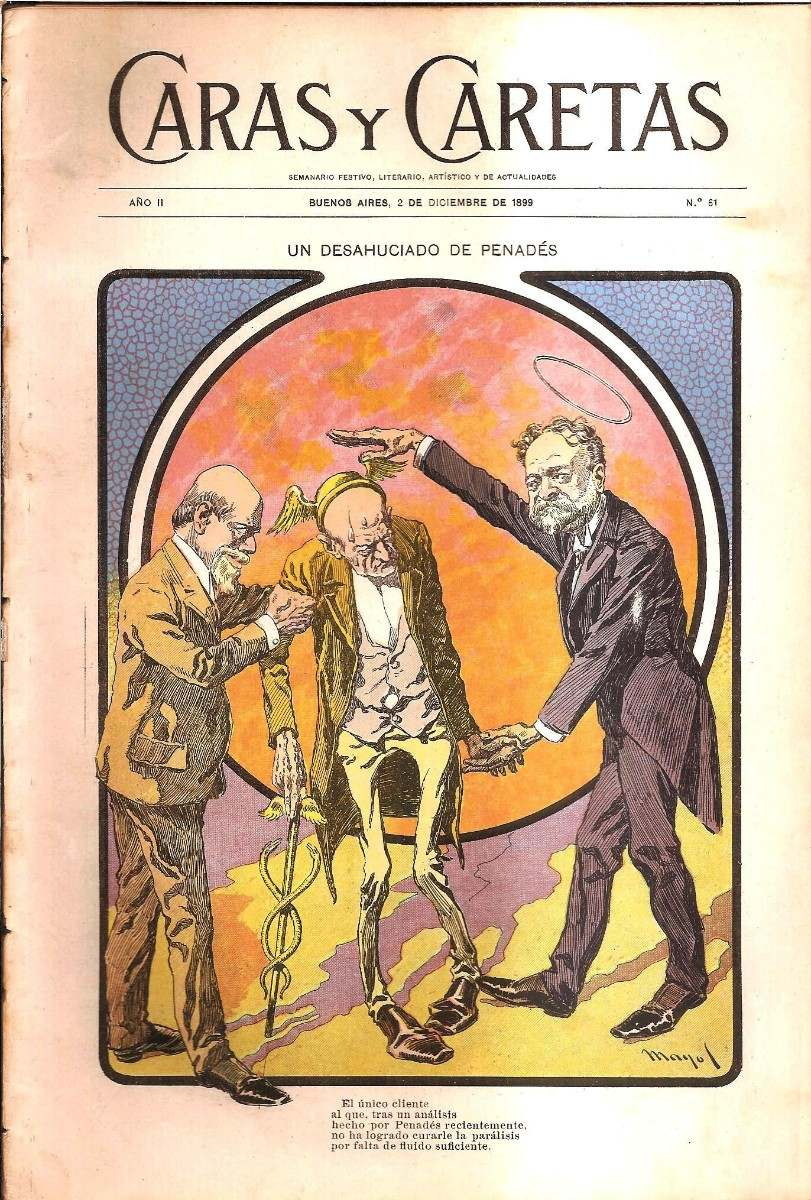

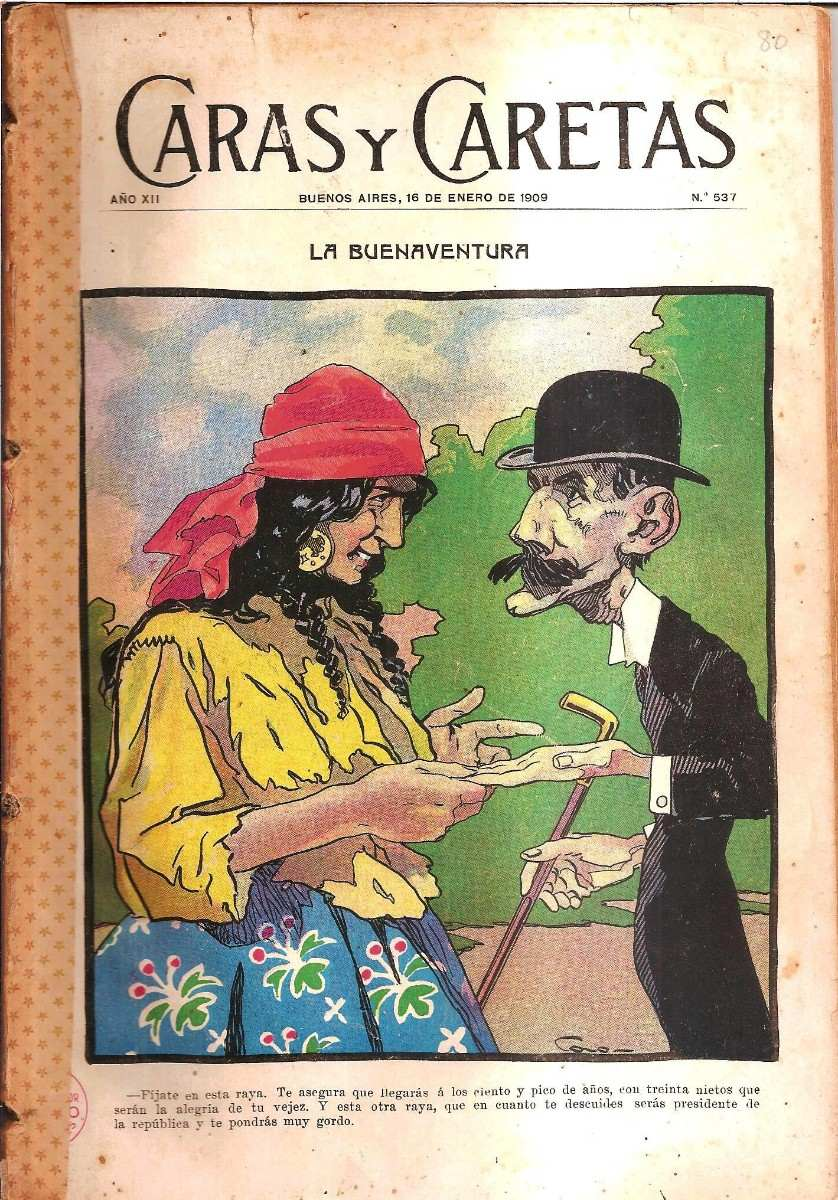

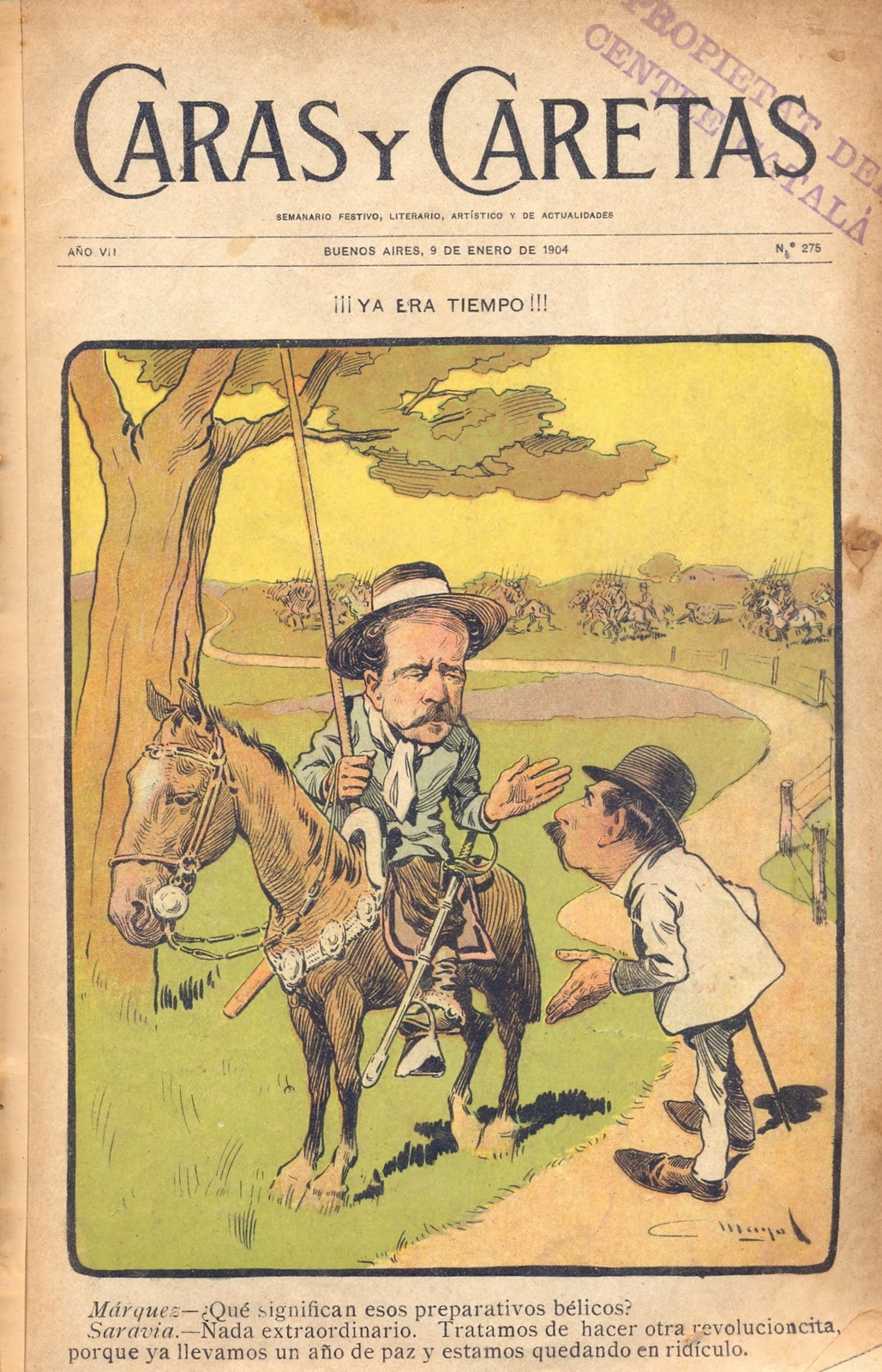

== See also ==
- Fray Mocho
