= Homero Alsina Thevenet =

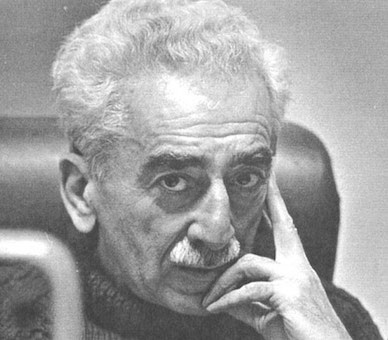
- Homero Alsina Thevenet
- Born: 6 August 1922; Montevideo, Uruguay
- Died: 1 December 2005 (aged 83); Montevideo, Uruguay
- Occupations: Journalist, writer and film critic
- Honours: Silver Condor Awards; Legion Book Award

Homero Alsina Thevenet (6 August 1922 – 1 December 2005) was a Uruguayan journalist and film critic.

== Biography ==
He began his career as a film critic at the age of 15 in the Uruguayan magazine Cine Radio Actualidad by René Arturo Despouey, whom he always considered his teacher. He made film reviews Along with Hugo Alfaro for seven years for the weekly Marcha. In 1954 he began working on the entertainment page of the newspaper El País. Between 1965 and 1976 he worked in Buenos Aires in the magazine Primera Plana and in the April publishing house. After the military coup of 1976 in Argentina he went into exile in Barcelona. In 1984 he returned to Argentina where he was Head of Shows for the newspaper La Razón and then for Página 12. In 1989, he returned to Montevideo where he founded El País Cultural, the cultural weekly of the newspaper El País; he was its director for 17 years until his death.

He is considered a master of film criticism. He published works on the history of silent movies, the Hollywood blacklist, film censorship, and the actor Charles Chaplin. Together with Emir Rodríguez Monegal he wrote the first book written outside of Sweden about the director Ingmar Bergman.

Not all his work was directed towards the cinema, he also wrote, compiled and increased an encyclopedia on useless data in which he included a large collection of rare and interesting data, presented in a sarcastic tone and with black humor towards the society of the end of the 1980s.

== Award ==
In 2002, he was awarded the Cóndor de Plata Prize for his trajectory awarded by the Association of Cinematographic Chroniclers of Argentina. Alsina was awarded the Legion Book Prize awarded by the Uruguayan Chamber of Books.

== Play ==
- Ingmar Bergman, a film playwright ?? (with Emir Rodríguez Monegal, Renaissance. 1964)
- Censorship and other pressures on the cinema (Fabril. 1972)
- Film Chronicles (Dela Flor. 1973)
- Violence and eroticism (with S. Feldman and A. Mahieu, Fourth World. 1974)
- American talkies and the Hollywood Oscars (Corregidor. 1975)
- Chaplin, all about a myth (Bruguera. 1977)
- The Book of Film Censorship (Lumen)
- Texts and manifestos of cinema (with J. Romaguera, Gili. 1980)
- An encyclopedia of useless data (Ediciones la Flor, Buenos Aires. 1986)
- Second encyclopedia of useless data (Ediciones la Flor, Buenos Aires. 1987)
- Cinelecturas I (Ediciones Trilce. 1990)
- From creation to the first sound. History of American cinema / 1 (1893–1930) (Editorial Laertes, Barcelona. 1993)
- Movie stories (El cuenco de Plata, Buenos Aires. 2007)

== See also ==
- Delmira Agustini (24 October 1886 – 6 July 1914) Uruguay poet
- Emir Rodríguez Monegal (28 July 1921 – 14 November 1985) Uruguay literary critic
- Mario Benedetti (14 September 1920 – 17 May 2009) Uruguay journalist, novelist, poet

== Bibliography ==
- Solari, Ana (2013). "Autorretrato de Homero Alsina Thevenet" (PDF). p. 296. Archived from the original (PDF) on 3 January 2014.
- Alsina Thevenet, Homero (2013). Algo sobre cine I. Criticas cinematográficas, 1937 – 2005. Montevideo: Irrupciones Grupo Editor.
- Alsina Thevenet, Homero (2013). Algo sobre cine II. Notas periodísticas, 1942 – 2005. Montevideo: Irrupciones Grupo Editor.
