= El Nueve =

Argentine broadcast television network

El Nueve (LS 83 TV Canal 9)
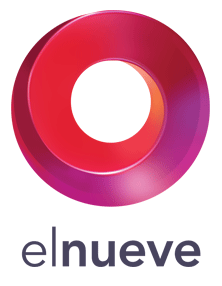
- Logo used since 2017
- Buenos Aires; Argentina
- Channels: Analog: 9 (VHF); Digital: 35 (UHF)

Ownership
- Owner: Grupo Octubre; (Telearte S.A.)
- Sister stations: Argentina/12

History
- First air date: June 9, 1960
- Former names: Canal 9 Cadete (1960–1963); Canal 9 Libertad (1963–1974 and 1984–1998); Canal 9 (1974–1984, 1998–1999 and 2002–2016); Color 9 (1979–1980); Azul Televisión (1999–2002)

Technical information
- Licensing authority: ENACOM

Links
- Webcast: www.elnueve.com.ar/en-vivo
- Website: www.elnueve.com.ar

Channel 9, known by its brand name El Nueve (stylized as elnueve), is an Argentine free-to-air television network based in Buenos Aires with programming centred on general entertainment.

== History ==
=== Origins and first Romay ownership ===
The license to operate channel 9 in Buenos Aires was granted on April 28, 1958, with the passing of Decree No. 6,287 by the National Executive Chamber to Compañía Argentina de Televisión (Cadete). At the time, Cadete was formed by brothers Curt G. Lowe and Frederick Lowe,as well as support from US network NBC, which acted as a content producer (since the Broadcasting Law forbade foreign companies from owing shares in the licensees of radio and television stations.

The first studios of the channel were in Castex 3345 in the Buenos Aires neighborhood of Palermo. It began broadcasting with comedy programs. It became popular and had several owners as well as incorporating other stations.

After the fall of the second government of Juan Perón, the military government of Pedro Eugenio Aramburu opened three new television licenses in Buenos Aires for bidding: channels 9, 11 and 13. The winner for channel 9, which would bear the callsign LS 83 TV, was Compañía Argentina de Televisión, S.A. (CADETE), which began its broadcasts in 1960. Canal 9's stock was partially owned by foreign companies, including the United States' NBC.

In 1963 Alejandro Saúl Romay, who was the owner of Radio Libertad and known as "the czar of TV", became the manager of Canal 9, and in the following years he acquired the stock held by the foreign investors, transforming Canal 9 into the first television network fully funded by Argentine capital. Under his leadership, Canal 9 became competitive in the ratings, fighting for first place with Canal 13 and then Canal 11.

In 1972, the program Almorzando con Mirtha Legrand was broadcast in color experimentally. At the time, the station mostly produced variety shows.

=== Nationalization ===
In 1974, during Juan Perón's third term as President of Argentina, Canal 9 was seized by the government along with channels 11 and 13, remaining as a state-owned station throughout the following military regime, this time under Argentine Army administration. It began color broadcasts in 1980.

=== Romay returns ===
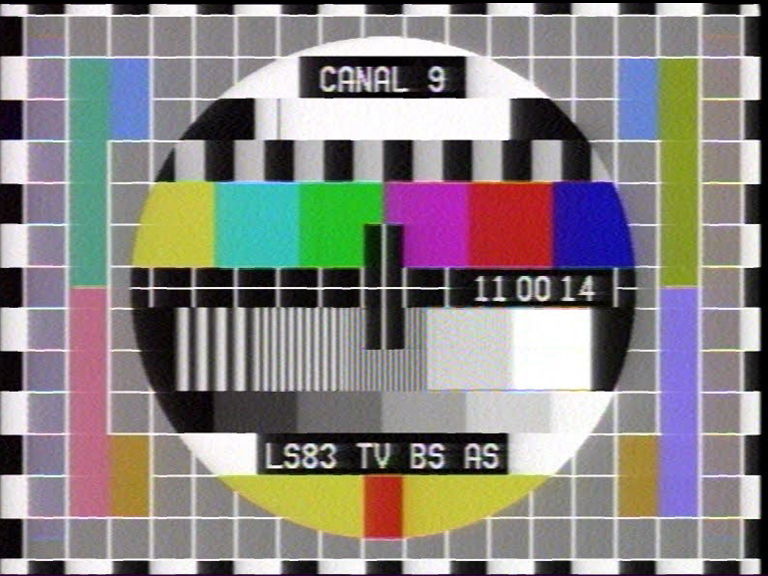
Off-air screen capture of Canal 9 Philips PM5544 test pattern, transmitted in 1984.

At the end of military dictatorship, the network was re-privatized in 1983, and Alejandro Romay regained control of the channel in the bidding process, a position he would hold from taking possession of the station on May 25, 1984, until 1997. In the five months between the return to democracy and Romay's taking control of the station, Alfredo Garrido took over as administrator, sowing the seeds for Canal 9's return to the top of the ratings throughout the remainder of the 1980s. Romay's long term as the owner of Canal 9 made him one of the most powerful figures in Argentine media. Following its re-privatization, the station was renamed "Canal 9 Libertad" (Channel 9 Liberty) and a new logo debuted for this purpose. In 1997, new studios were constructed in the Buenos Aires neighborhood of Colegiales.

At its height under Romay, Canal 9 adopted as part of its visual identity a dove near the number 9 logo, which earned the channel the nickname of El canal de la palomita ("The channel of the little dove"). It was replaced with a heart logo in 1994.

=== 1997–2002: Azul Televisión ===
Australian regional broadcaster Prime Television bought all of Canal 9 in 1997 for US$135 million ($271 million in 2025 dollars); Prime then onsold half of it for US$74 million. In response to a ratings slump and wanting to tone down Canal 9 from a style that often tended toward the sensational under Romay, a US$20 million ($39.5 million in 2025 dollars) rebranding effort was embarked upon, with its largest element a massive rebrand from Canal 9 Libertad to Azul Televisión in January 1999.

However, Prime Television did not get nearly the return on its investment that it wanted. The timing was exceptionally bad for Prime, as the acquisition and improvements made to Azul coincided with the start of the 1998–2002 Argentine great depression. In late 1999, Azul-related losses sent Prime's net profit plummeting 99% over the previous year and led to the departure of its chief executive. Total losses incurred from the Argentinian business were north of A$50 million (US$25.9 million, $47.1 million in 2025 dollars). Amidst these spectacular losses, national economic problems, and ratings that were not improving, Prime looked to get out, announcing it was selling its interest in Azul in March 1999. In 2001, Prime's foray into Argentina, which had lasted more than three years, ended, to the relief of its shareholders, when it sold its stake to JP Morgan for US$67.5 million ($123 million in 2025 dollars).

Spain's Telefónica began moving to buy out Azul. Using acquisitions and discussions with the owners of the remaining 50%, Telefónica grew its stake in the network. in 1999, but its preexisting ownership of ratings leader Telefe (channel 11) posed a problem. Argentina's Federal Radio and Broadcasting Committee (COMFER) forced Telefónica to sell off its Azul stake.

=== 2002–present: Canal 9 returns ===
On August 20, 2002, Azul Televisión reverted to its original Canal 9 name as both the stake that Prime had sold to JP Morgan and the Telefónica stake were sold to a society headed by the journalist and media businessman Daniel Hadad. In January 2007, he sold the network to Mexican investor Remigio Ángel González under his group Albavisión. Hadad first sold 80% of it and remained in charge of editorial content for the news programs, then exited the remainder of his stake.

On November 20, 2020, the Grupo Octubre bought 90% of the channel, the remaining 10% was entrusted to Carlos Lorefice Lynch, who remained as president of Telearte.

== Feeds ==
- elnueve Satelital
- elnueve Interior

== Slogans ==
- 1960-1963 – Del nueve Nadie me mueve
- 1963-1964 – Donde ponga el ojo ponga el nueve
- 1964-1974 – Lo nuevo está en el 9
- 1984-1989 – Canal 9 Libertad siempre líder
- 1988-1989 – Primero en audiencia primero en calidad
- 1988 – Canal 9, Ganador
- 1989 – Un líder que moviliza a toda la televisión Argentina
- 1990-1991 – Vive tu dia en libertad
- 1991 – La fuerza de la gente
- 1992-1994 – Defendamos la vida
- 1995-1997 – El corazón de la gente
- 1997-1999 – Siempre más
- 2002 – Igual que vos
- 2003 – Para vos
- 2003-2004 – Bienvenido a casa
- 2004-2005 – Podés entrar
- 2005-2006 – Donde vos estás
- 2006 Copa mundial 2006:– El canal de Argentina
- 2007 (navidad:) El canal de la familia
- 2009-2013 Somos vos
- 2010 (Julio) - Canal 9 (50 Años)
- 2013-2014 – Compartimos todo con vos
- 2014-2015 – Crea con vos
- 2015 – Viví Canal 9
- 2016-2017 – Mi canal
- 2017 – Viviendo con vos
- 2018 (Enero-Junio) – Conectado a vos
- 2018-2019 – Un aire nuevo
- 2019 - El canal de las latas
- 2019 - El canal que vos elegís en vivo
- 2019-2021 - Siempre en movimiento
- 2021 - Sumate
