= Bernardo Verbitsky =

Argentine writer and journalist (1907–1979)

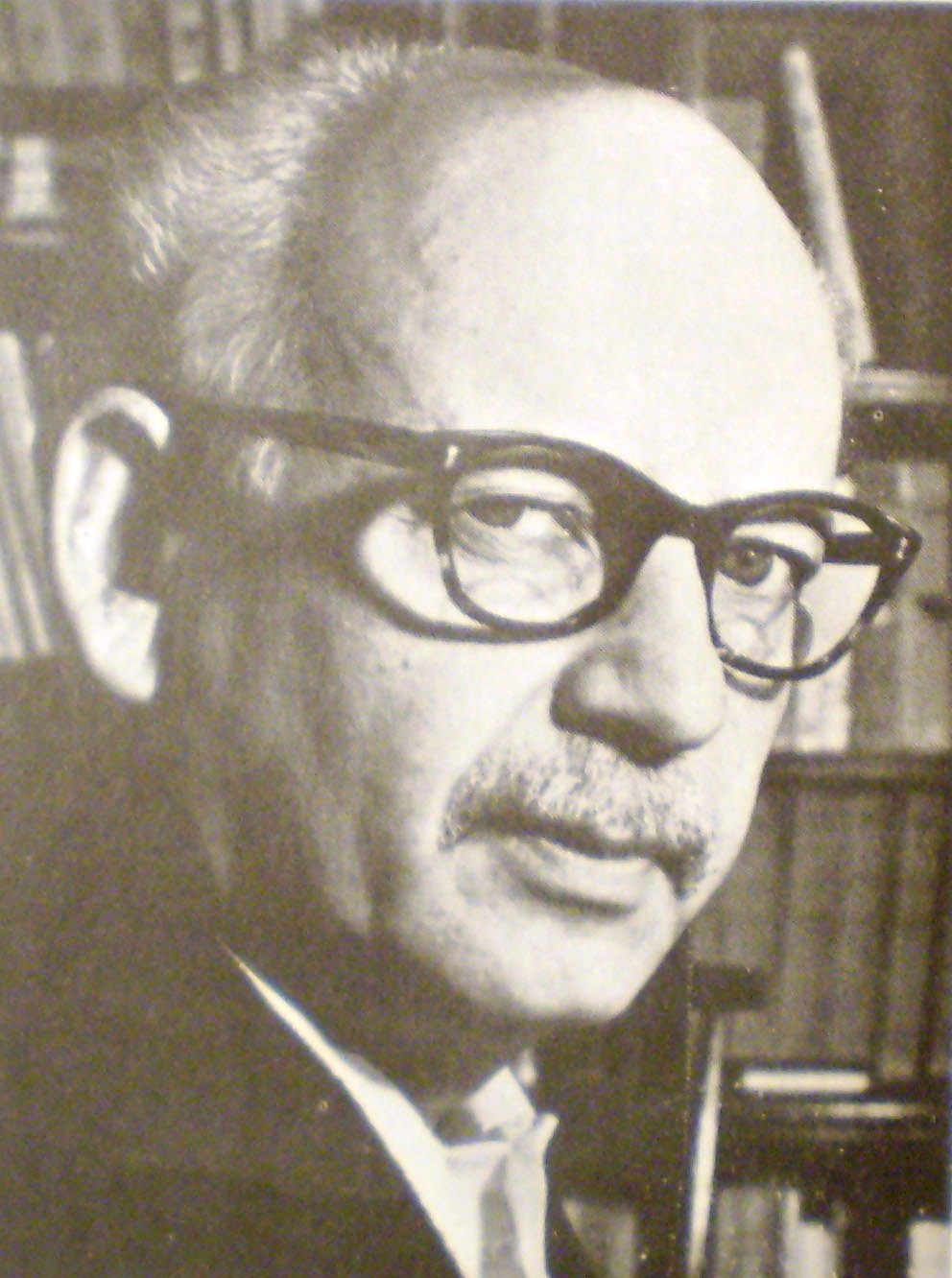
Bernardo Verbitsky

Bernardo Verbitsky (22 November 1907 – 15 March 1979) was an Argentine writer and journalist.

== Biography ==
Verbitsky was born of Ukrainian-Jewish immigrant parents (his surname Verbitsky means willow in Ukrainian). He was a screenwriter, a journalist from Noticias Gráficas, and a member of Academia Porteña del Lunfardo ("Buenos Aires Lunfardo's Academy"). He reported Buenos Aires' ups and downs; his writings were linked to tango and other essential aspects of the city. Hugo del Carril based its 1958 motion picture Una cita con la vida ("A date with life" ) on Verbitsky's novel Calles de tango.

His 1957 novel Villa Miseria también es América (roughly "Povertyville is also [a part of] America") gave its popular name to Argentina's shanty towns (villas miseria).

Bernardo Verbitsky died in Buenos Aires on 15 March 1979.

Verbitsky is the father of journalist and activist Horacio Verbitsky.

== Bibliography ==
- Es difícil empezar a vivir ("It's hard to start living") (1940)
- Significación de Stefan Zweig -ensayo- (1942)
- En estos años ("During these years") (1947)
- Café de los Angelitos y otros cuentos porteños ("Little Angels' Café and other porteño stories") (1950)
- Una pequeña familia ("A small family") (1951)
- La esquina ("The corner") (1953)
- Calles de tango ("Tango streets") (1953)
- Vacaciones ("Vacations") (1953)
- Un noviazgo ("A relationship") (1956)
- Villa Miseria también es América ("Povertyville is also America") (1957)
- Megatón -poemas- (1959)
- El teatro de Arthur Miller -ensayo- (1959)
- La tierra es azul ("The Earth is blue") (1961)
- Hamlet y Don Quijote (ensayo) (1964)
- Un hombre de papel (1966)
- La neurosis monta su espectáculo (1969)
- Etiquetas a los hombres -edit. in Barcelona- (1972)
- Enamorado de Joan Baez -edit. in Barcelona- (1975)
- Literatura y consciencia nacional -ensayos- (1975)
- Octubre maduro -stories- (1976)
- Hermana y sombra (1977)
- A pesar de todo -stories- (1978)

== Awards ==
- "Ricardo Güiraldes" award, (in trial with Jorge Luis Borges, Guillermo De Torre y Norah Lange) by Es Difícil Empezar a Vivir (1941).
- "Alberto Gerchunoff" award (1965) by Es Difícil Empezar a Vivir.
- "Faja de Honor" of the Writer's Argentina Society (SADE) by En esos años.
- "Municipal" award by Villa Miseria También Es América.
- Mention in an award from Kraft Edit. by Villa Miseria también es América.
- "Faja de Honor" of the SADE by La Neurosis Monta Su Espectáculo.
- "Club of the XIII" by Hermana Y Sombra.
- Dupuytrén Foundation award by Hermana Y Sombra.

== Sources ==
- This article draws from the corresponding article in the Spanish Wikipedia.
