= Grupo Octubre =

Argentine media company

Grupo Octubre S.A.
- Type: Nonprofit organization
- Industry: Mass media Sports; Education; Culture
- Founded: October 17, 2006; 19 years ago
- Headquarters: Buenos Aires, Argentina
- Area served: Argentina
- Key people: Víctor Santa María (CEO (holder of Fundación Octubre)); Francisco Meritello (Chief executive)
- Products: Newspapers; Newsprint; Magazine; Cable television Radio broadcasting Internet service
- Brands: List: Página/12; Diario Z; Caras y Caretas; El Planeta Urbano; elnueve; Argentina/12; AM 750; Blackie FM 89.1; Mucha Radio; Aspen 102.3
- Subsidiaries: Grupo Girola; Multiposter S.A.
- Website: octubre.com

Grupo Octubre S.A. (GO S.A.) is an Argentine multimedia company created and directed by businessman and unionist Víctor Santa María, headquartered in the city of Buenos Aires. The group is administered by Fundación Octubre de Trabajadores de Edificios, owned by Sindicato Único de Trabajadores de Edificios de Renta y Horizontal (SUTERH), also led by Santa María.

== History ==
The Octubre Foundation existed prior to the creation of the group, developing cultural and training projects. The same company had been directing the revival of the Caras y Caretas magazine since its relaunch in 2005, including the cultural center of the same name, which was later joined by a greater participation in the printed media scene: in 2016, Grupo Octubre presented its merger with notorious progressivist newspaper Página 12.

In the cultural field, Octubre is also in charge of managing Universidad Metropolitana para la Educación y el Trabajo (UMET), which also houses the group's studios for radio and television. Founded in 2012, UMET (which in 2015 had around 700 students) was founded by then-president Cristina Kirchner alongside current Brazilian president Lula da Silva.

The group also had an incursion in filmmaking with the Filmar trust, who made some films, among them, Verdades verdaderas, la vida de Estela, a biographical film about the founder of Grandmothers of Plaza de Mayo, Estela de Carlotto. Octubre also helped financing Néstor Kirchner, la película. Moreover, in the sports field, Santa María presides Sportivo Barracas (currently playing in the Primera C Metropolitana league), which obtained its reaffiliation to AFA in the 2013/2014 season.

In 2020, it acquired El Nueve from Albavisión.

== Assets ==
=== Print media ===
The company has four print publications, two newspapers and two magazines.

Publication	Type	Established on	Format
Diario Página/12	Newspaper	May 26, 1987	Generalist.
Diario Z	Newspaper	November 26, 2009	Newspaper exclusive to Buenos Aires.
Revista Caras y Caretas	Magazine	August 19, 1898	Political humor, under its current administration, it became the first interactive magazine in Argentina.
Revista El Planeta Urbano	Magazine	October 1, 1997	Lifestyle magazine.

=== Television ===
It owns two channels, both of which are available over-the-air.

Logo	Name	Content	Launched on	LCN
	elnueve	Main generalist channel, the channel has a wide array of original content including news, entertainment, talk shows and occasionally series, among others.	June 9, 1960	Channel 9 (VHF); Channel 35.1
	Argentina/12	News channel.	October 17, 2020	Channel 24.5

=== Sports ===
Name	Team
Sportivo Barracas	Soccer team founded on October 30, 1913. Managed by Santa María.

=== Education and culture ===
Name	Services
Centro Cultural/Sala Caras y Caretas	Theater with three rooms: 2037 Teatro, 330 Café Cultural and 330 Salas.
Universidad Metropolitana para la Educación y el Trabajo (UMET)	Wide variety of university courses, currently in the theatrical circuit.
Instituto Superior Octubre (ISO)	Tertiary institute with seven courses, where the most noteworthy is nursing.

=== Services ===
Name	Services
Octubre TV	Online VOD platform.
Editorial Octubre	Book publishing and creating.
Latinoamérica Piensa	Web portal.
FilmarFondeart	Film financing project.
