= Swiftgate =

1991 scandal in Argentina

"Swiftgate" was the name given to a 1991 corruption scandal in Argentina during the presidency of Carlos Menem.

== Background ==
Swift, an American food processing company, wanted to apply for a grant to keep open its facilities in the province of Santa Fe. The presidential adviser Emir Yoma was accused of asking for a commission or kickback in exchange for facilitating the process.

In December 1990, the ambassador of the United States, Terence Todman, sent a note to the Argentine government, which backed a complaint from Swift of a bribery request to "speed up" the release of tax paperwork for machinery for its plant in Rosario.

As a result of the events, Yoma had to resign for asking the bribe and Antonio Erman Gonzalez left the Ministry of Economy.

The whistleblower was the economist Guillermo Nielsen, who had worked for Swift and had to settle in Uruguay for the next two years following a series of threats.

== See also ==
- Yomagate
- Carlos Menem
- Horacio Verbitsky
