= Hermenegildo Sábat Lleó =

- Born: 13 April 1874; Palma de Mallorca, Spain
- Died: 17 February 1931 (aged 56); Montevideo, Uruguay
- Known for: caricaturist
- Relatives: Mariano Sabat y Fargas (father), Viviana Concepción Lleó Andreu (mother), Carlos Sabat Ercasty (half-brother), Juan Carlos Sábat Pebet (son), Hermenegildo Sábat (grandson)

Hermenegildo Sábat Lleó (13 April 1874 – 17 February 1931) was a Uruguayan caricaturist, draftsman, and painter of Spanish origin.

== Biography ==
Born to Mariano Sabat y Fargas and Viviana Concepción Lleó Andreu, Sábat moved to Uruguay at a young age.

At the age of 19, Hermenegildo Sábat Lleó began his career by securing a position as a drawing instructor at the Boarding School for Boys through a competitive examination. The following year, he delivered a series of pedagogical lectures that introduced a novel approach to teaching drawing.

In addition to his teaching duties, Sábat directed fencing activities for the school's students. He was also elected as the head examiner at the Normal Institute for Young Ladies. By 1913, he had been appointed a professor of drawing at the Círculo de Bellas Artes.

At the turn of the 20th century, Sábat gained recognition as a caricaturist known for his precise line work and sharp, witty humor. Serving as secretary, he contributed to Pedro Figari's reform of the National School of Arts and Crafts from 1915 to 1917. Sábat was also actively involved in journalism, politics, and education, often collaborating with Figari on these efforts.

He contributed to several prominent publications, including the newspaper El Día and the magazines Bohemia and La Semana. In 1917, Sábat succeeded Pedro Figari as the director of the National School of Arts and Crafts in Uruguay. He also worked as a draftsman for Caras y Caretas, an Argentine magazine led by Eustaquio Pellicer.

== Family ==
Sábat's half-brother on his father's side was the poet Carlos Sabat Ercasty. His son, Juan Carlos Sábat Pebet, became a writer, while his grandson, Hermenegildo Sábat, gained fame as a cartoonist and caricaturist.
