= Adolfo Scilingo =

Argentine naval officer and convicted criminal against humanity

- Born: July 28, 1946 (age 80); Bahía Blanca, Buenos Aires Province, Argentina
- Known for: Participation in the Argentine death squads

Adolfo Scilingo (born 28 July 1946) is a former Argentine Navy officer who is serving 30 years (the legally applied limit, although he was sentenced to 640 years) in a Spanish prison after being convicted on 19 April 2005 for crimes against humanity, including extra-judicial execution.

== Charges ==
Scilingo was charged under Spain's universal jurisdiction laws by investigating magistrate Baltazar Garzón with genocide, 30 counts of murder, 93 of causing injury, 255 of terrorism and 286 of torture. He denied the charges but initially refused to plead, claiming to be unwell. In 2005 doctors ruled Scilingo was fit to stand trial.

The murder charges were related to 30 drugged political prisoners thrown out of government aircraft during Leopoldo Galtieri's military junta's Dirty War against leftist insurgents between 1976 and 1983.

Scilingo, who retired from the Navy in 1986, later attracted great notoriety for publicly confessing in March 1995 to journalist Horacio Verbitsky to participating in the so-called death flights - the first of a series of public confessions collectively called in Argentina the 'Scilingo effect' (Feitlowitz 1999). Scilingo was serving a jail term for fraud in Argentina at the time.

== Judgement ==
The court found Scilingo guilty of crimes against humanity and torture and sentenced him to 640 years in jail, 21 years for each murder of 30 victims, who were thrown from planes to their deaths, and a further five years for torture and five years for illegal detention. Scilingo is unlikely to serve more than 30 years in jail as that is the maximum time a person can serve for non-terrorist offences.

The Spanish case was the first use of a new Spanish law whereby people can be prosecuted for crimes committed outside Spain. Scilingo's confession prompted Argentines residing in Spain to press charges against him. It also led to Chileans living in Spain to file charges against their former dictator, Augusto Pinochet, who was later arrested in Britain at the request of Judge Baltasar Garzón.

On 4 July 2007, the Supreme Court of Spain increased Scilingo's prison sentence to 1084 years (but effective for only 25 years) and altered the conviction to the specific penalties provided in the current criminal code for the crimes of murder and unlawful detention, but held that these crimes "constitute crimes against humanity according to international law."
