= Raúl Baglini =

Argentine politician (1949–2021)

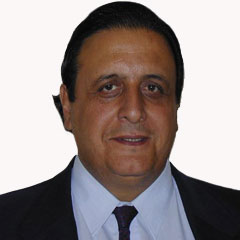
- Raúl Baglini in 1993.

National Senator
- In office 10 December 2001 – 10 December 2003
- Constituency: Mendoza

National Deputy
- In office 10 December 1983 – 10 December 1993
- Constituency: Mendoza

Personal details
- Born: Raúl Eduardo Baglini; 23 December 1949
- Died: 3 January 2021 (aged 71)
- Party: Radical Civic Union
- Occupation: Politician

Raúl Eduardo Baglini (23 December 1949 – 3 January 2021) was an Argentine politician and lawyer who served in both houses of the National Congress of Argentina, representing the Radical Civic Union.

== Biography ==
Baglini received his law degree from the National University of Córdoba. There, he began his membership in the Radical Civil Union, from the student group Franja Morada. He was a professor at the university and a member of the Faculty of Economical Sciences of the National University of Cuyo. In the 1983 elections, he was elected national deputy, with his party triumphing over Peronism. He held office until 1985, and was re-elected in 1989 and 1993.

During his time in the Chamber of Deputies, he was identified as a strong supporter of President Raúl Alfonsín and a firm opponent of his successor, Peronist Carlos Menem. He was head at the bench of his party, of the Budget and the Treasury Commission and was vice president of the chamber. He was president of the National Convention of the UCR.

He was chosen as a candidate to govern Mendoza, but was defeated by Peronist José Octavio Bordón, after countless debates in which both believed to be victors.

During Menem's rule, he maintained relations with the postal businessman Alfredo Yabrán, and was accused of complicity in his illegal business.

After his time in the Chamber of the Deputies, he returned to being the legal profession, as head of a legal study and representative of the Federal Administration of Public Revenues against large evaders.

In 2001, he was chosen as National Senator for his province. He participated in the Global Bond Exchange (known as the "Megacanje") of his country's external debt and supported the initiative of President Fernando de la Rúa. He excused himself from participating in the trial against Eduardo Moliné O'Connor, the Judge of the Supreme Court, since his study had conducted trials before the aforementioned one.

After his passage through the Senate, he was an advisor to the UCR on economic matters. As of 2008, he collaborated with Vice President Julio Cobos in the reorganization of the Mendoza party. He abandoned most of his political work in 2010, after a stress spike landed him a lengthy visit to the hospital.

Baglini died on 3 January 2021, aged 71.

== Theorem ==
In a parliamentary debate prior to the 1989 elections, Baglini argued that politicians become more cautious in proposals the closer they are to power. Based on this concept, journalist Horacio Verbitsky coined this statement Baglini's Theorem. The term quickly became popular in political circles.
