= Extra TV =

Argentine commercial television network

- Type: Cable television network
- Country: Argentina

Programming
- Language: Spanish
- Picture format: HDTV 1080i

Ownership
- Owner: Franco Bindi

History
- Founded: 2023; 3 years ago
- Launched: May 25, 2022; 4 years ago
- Closed: October 2026; 0 months ago

Extra TV (stylized EXTRA!) was an Argentine news channel founded by Franco Bindi. The channel received backing from journalists aligned to the political left (Kirchnerism). The channel was sold to a Pakistani figurehead and realigned it with pro-Russian interests in 2024.

== History ==
The channel started broadcasting on 25 May 2023 with an official act from vice-president Cristina Fernandez de Kirchner, and was only available on YouTube. It then announced a slow rollout on over-the-air television and on pay TV platforms; its official launch took place on 5 June. The channel was put up under must carry laws and began rolling out on pay-TV services starting with Telecentro in August 2023. The bulk of the line-up consisted of news, political debates, entertainment and sports programming. Its launch on Telecentro coincided with the beginning of that year's presidential campaign. In its early months, the channel produced fourteen hours of live content a day, from 6am to 8pm.

In April 2024, Bindi sold the channel to Pakistani businessman Muhammad Nadir, who, according to sources familiar with the subject, used it as a figurehead. On 31 May 2024, Extra TV decided to cancel all of its live programs. New productions were limited to newsflashes, while the rest of the schedule consisted of repeats. In December 2024, the channel was relaunched carrying mostly pro-Russian propaganda, as well as relays of the like-minded Telesur and BRICS TV (based in Moscow). The Milei presidency repealed the channel's must carry status. It was also airing Data Urgente. A promo for a special edition of that program airing in January 2025 featured journalist Sebastián Salgado, its presenter, doing a two-week period of "rebel tourism, to end the blockade". The Cuba special also featured visits to the tombs of Fidel Castro and José Martí in Santiago de Cuba. In general, Data Urgente positioned itself as pro-Russian, Chavist, Castrist and anti-Israeli. Per a Clarín monitoring on 21 January, its main headlines included "Cuba doesn't give up despite being readmitted to the United States terrorist list", and "Palestinian resistance announces its next exchange of prisoners", calling the Israel Defense Forces "occupation forces" and Hamas as being "Palestinian resistance". Other programs included APU TV (produced by Agencia Paco Urondo) and two programs presented by Guillermo Moreno – himself being the last launch host still working on the channel – as well as constantly repeating an interview with Sergey Lavrov produced by BRICS TV.
