= Blanca Luz Brum =

Uruguayan journalist (1905–1985)

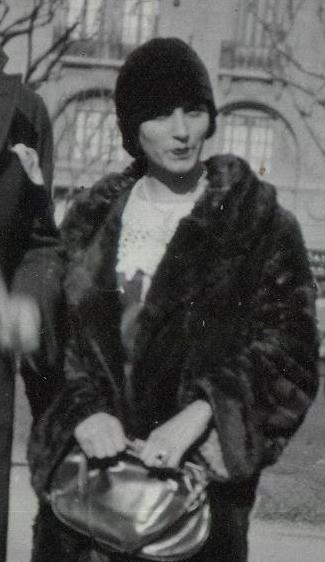
- Born: 31 May 1905
- Died: 7 August 1985 (aged 80)
- Citizenship: Uruguay
- Occupations: Poet, painter, editor

Blanca Luz Brum (31 May 1905, Pan de Azúcar, Maldonado - 7 August 1985, Santiago, Chile) was a writer, journalist, poet and artist from Uruguay.

== Biography ==
Brum was born on 31 May 1905 in Pan de Azúcar. Her family included her uncle, Balthazar Brum, a former president of Uruguay.

=== Family and relationships ===
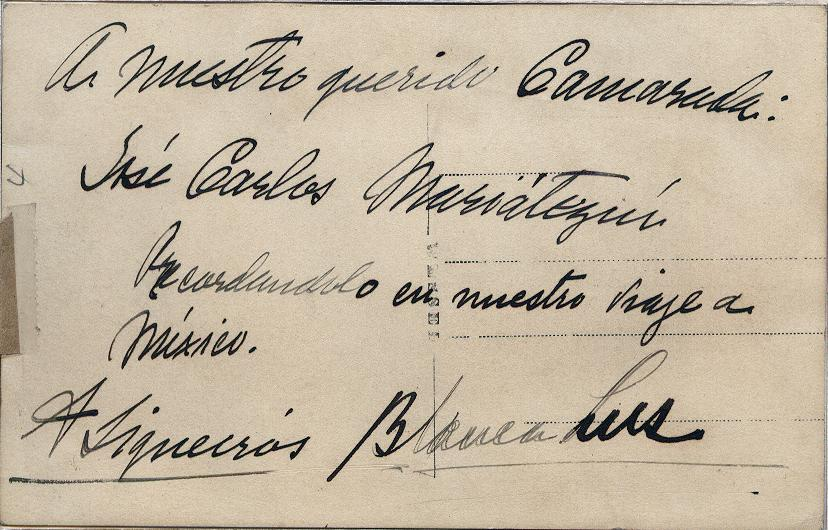
Blanca Luz Brum y David Alfaro Siqueiros

Much of Brum's reputation as a writer and artist was over-shadowed by her relationships. She was married several times: her first husband was the Peruvian poet, es:Juan Parra del Riego. Riego kidnapped her from a convent and they married when she was 17; he died of tuberculosis three years later, leaving her with a young son.

She married the Mexican painter, David Alfaro Siqueiros, who she met in May 1929. The couple lived in Los Angeles for a time. They married in 1932, but separated in 1933, whilst living in Montevideo. Whilst Siqueiros was imprisoned in 1930, she kept him supplied with artists materials. During this period, Brum wrote him many letters which were later published as Penitenciaría-Niño Perdido. Pablo Neruda claimed to have been her lover during this time.

In 1935, divorced from Siqueiros, she lived in northern Chile and married to Jorge Béeche, a mining engineer and radical. At the end of 1938 their daughter María Eugenia was born.

Brum had two sons: the first with Riego, the second with her fourth husband Nils Brunson. They both died in car accidents, separately.

=== Literature and art ===
Brum wrote vanguard poetry in the 1920s, contributed fiery articles to Amauta and edited her own journal: Guerrilla: Atalaya de la Revolucion. She was also a painter, inspired by her poetry and politics. In the 1930s she was a role model for women in revolutionary art and politics. Some of her work, such as the poem Himno, is now viewed as very early ecofeminism.

=== Politics ===
During the earlier part of her life, Brum was a supporter of left-wing militancy. During her time in Peru, she became a Marxist, influenced by José Carlos Mariátegui. In 1927 she was deported from Lima back to Uruguay, for her involvement in a communist plot involving other intellectuals, such as Magda Portal.

In the 1930's she was in Chile and as a APRA militant. When Chilean nazis murdered writer and storyteller Hector Bareto in 1936, who was in the same writers' club as a then young Miguel Serrano, she joined the funeral marches and there she had comforted the saddened Serrano, squeezed his hand and told him "cheer up, comrade", not knowing that Serrano would later become infamously closer to the Nazi politics of the murderers.

From 1943 on, she was related to the union sectors that gave rise to Peronism in Argentina, she served as press officer for the Ministry of Labour and Social Security under Juan Domingo Perón. She played a leading role as an organiser and agitator in the workers' mobilisation of 17 October 1945, which freed Perón from his arrest ordered by a military coup d'état and opened the way to his electoral victory the following year.

She was exiled during the Uruguayan dictatorship (1973–1985). She actively participated in politics in her country and in other Latin American countries where she lived, such as Chile or Mexico.

=== Life on Juan Fernandez Island ===
Brum became extremely interested with life on the remote Juan Fernandez Island and was eventually secluded there, due to her role in helping the escape from prison of the Argentine politician Guillermo Patricio Kelly. She wrote poetry about life there.

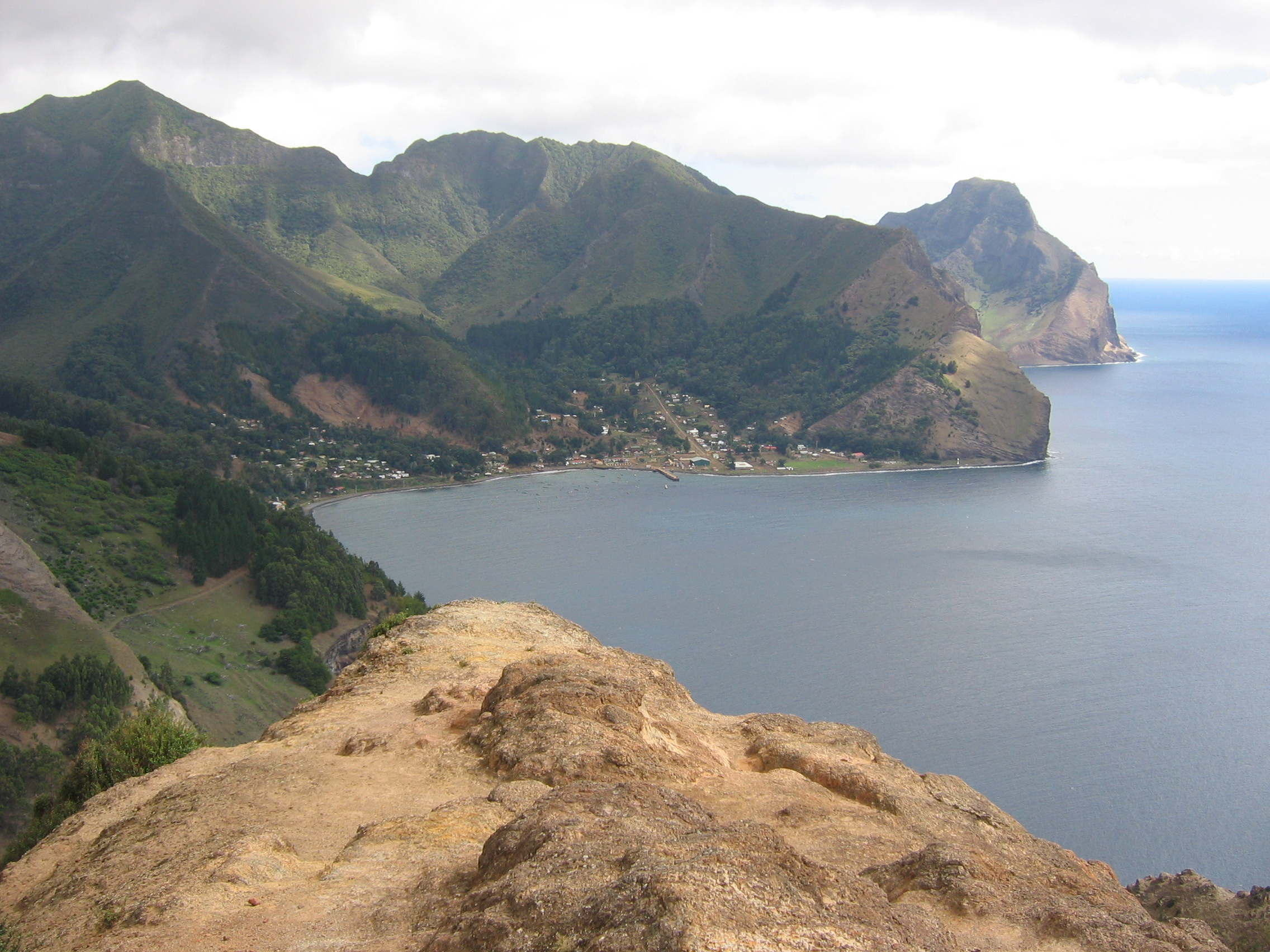
Panorama - Isla Juan Fernandez

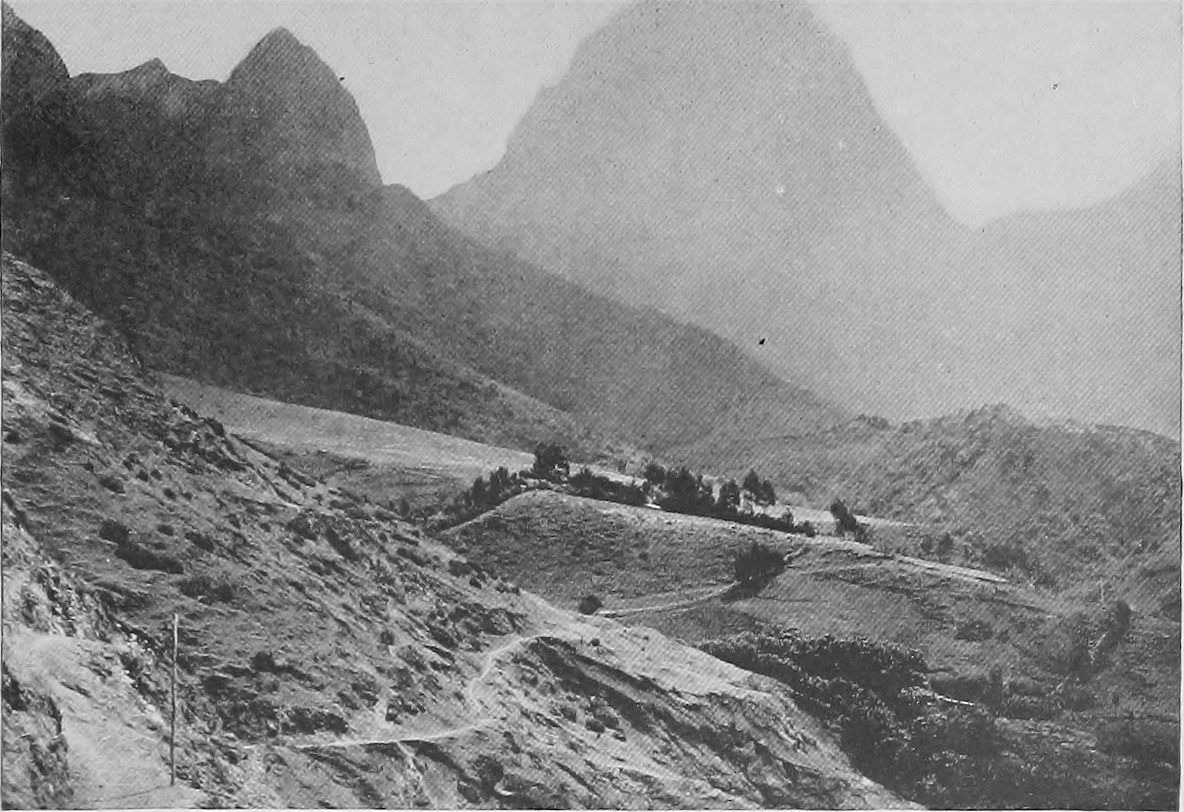
Juan Fernandez, 1922

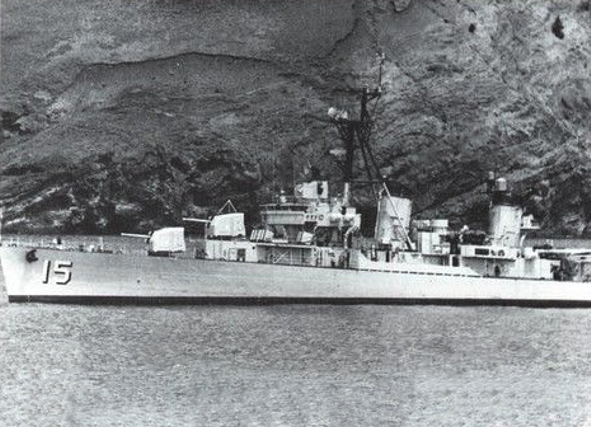

In 1981 she became a Chilean citizen and died there four years later.

== Legacy ==
=== Works ===
- Las llaves ardientes (1925)
- Levante (Lima 1928)
- Penitenciaría-Niño Perdido (Mexico, 1931)
- es:Atmósfera arriba. Veinte poemas (Buenos Aires, 1933)
- Blanca Luz contra la corriente (Chile, 1935)
- Cantos de América del Sur (Chile, 1939)
- Del cancionero de Frutos Rivera (1943)
- El último Robinson (Chile, 1953)

=== In the media ===
- I will not travel hidden is a documentary film by Pablo Zubizarreta about Brum and she is played by Mercedes Morán.
- The novel Falsas memorias: Blanca Luz Brum by Hugo Achugar re-tells Brum's life through fiction.
