= Megacanje =

The Megacanje was an Argentine program that refinanced the Argentine foreign debt in 2001, during the 1998–2002 Argentine great depression. The payment of 30,000 million dollars was delayed to 2005, in exchange of a 14% interest rate.

The president Fernando de la Rúa and the minister Domingo Cavallo were trialed for this case, and declared innocent on October 6, 2014.

== See also ==
- Argentine debt restructuring
