= Fray Mocho =

Argentine writer and journalist

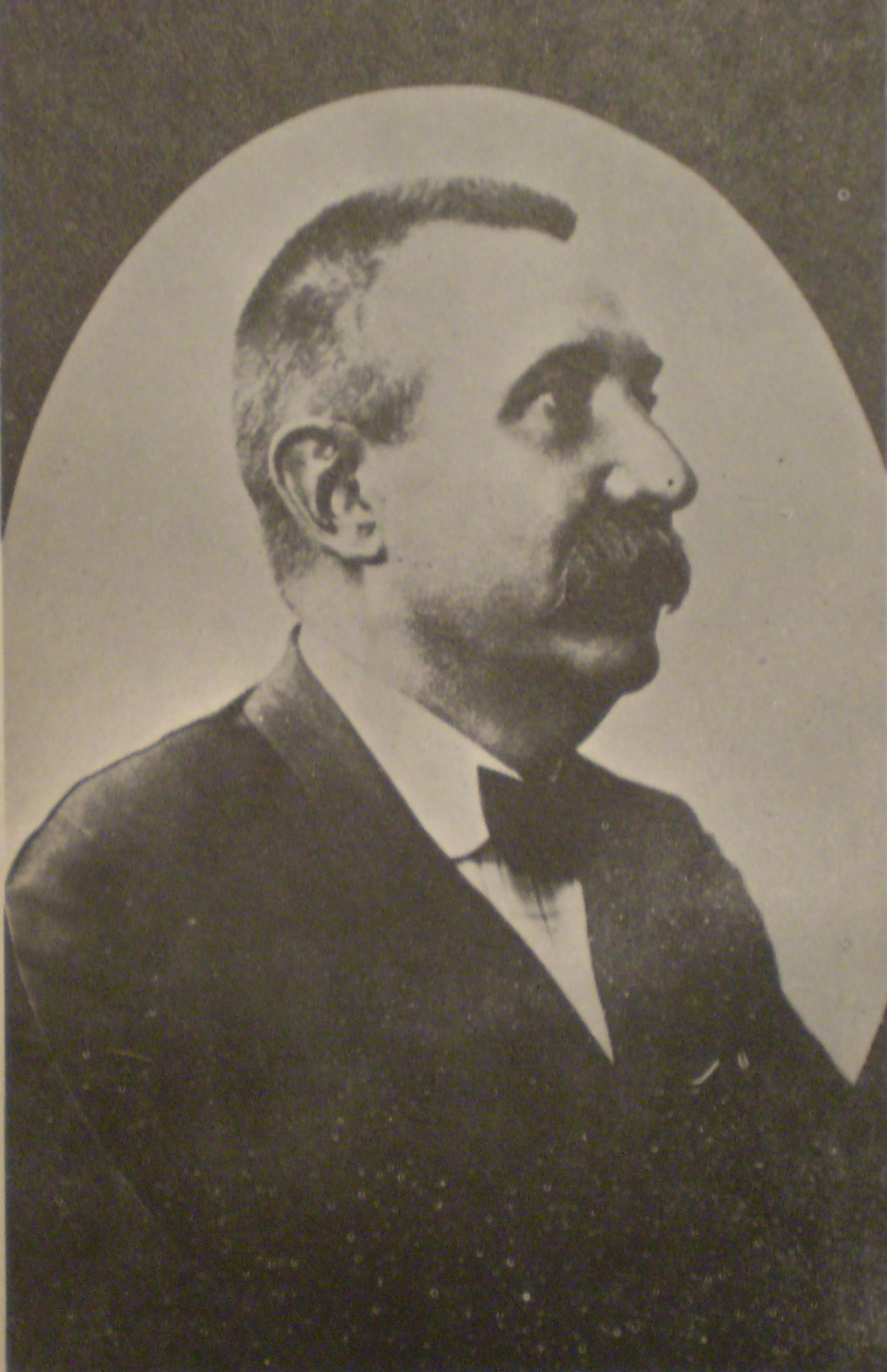
Portrait of Álvarez, unknown date

Fray Mocho (Gualeguaychú, 26 August 1858 – Buenos Aires, 23 August 1903) was the pen name for the Argentine writer and journalist José Ciriaco Alvarez (also known as José Sixto Alvarez). He moved to Buenos Aires first in 1876 and then again to stay in 1879 at the age of 21. He was known to his friends as "Mocho" (blunt) and later added the title "Fray" (brother, as in a Friar in the Catholic Church). He wrote for several newspapers including El Nacional, La Pampa, La Patria Argentina, and La Razón. He also wrote for magazines such as the short-lived Fray Gerundio, El Ateneo and La Colmena Artística. He wrote essays about life in Buenos Aires in the latter part of the 19th century, including Esmeraldas (polished), Cuentos Mundanos (Ordinary Stories), La vida de los ladrones célebres de Buenos Aires y sus maneras de robar ("The life of celebrated robbers of Buenos Aires and their manner of robbing") and Memorias de un Vigilante (Memoirs of a policeman). In 1898 he wrote the book En el Mar Austral ("In the Southern Sea").

== Biography ==
The period in which he flourished was a heady time in Buenos Aires. The nation of Argentina had finally come together with the uniting of the city of Buenos Aires with the rest of the country, Domingo Faustino Sarmiento and Bartolomé Mitre were still alive, and Buenos Aires was striving to become the "Queen City" of South America.

He was the founder and first editor of the Argentine Magazine Caras y Caretas ("Faces and Masks"). The magazine featured a mixture of cartoons and illustrations along with national and foreign subjects taken from social news, notes of general interest and fashion. The magazine also published literary and rural literature. Its contributors include some of the leading lights of Argentine letters: Roberto Payró, Horacio Quiroga, and José Ingenieros, among others. He was the first professional writer of Argentina. In his descriptions of regional customs, the narrator is a watching observer. He wrote at times in the different modes of Buenos Aires speech including the "lunfardo" (the argot or slang of Buenos Aires which still exists). His writing was part of a movement of modernism which was a reaction against the prevailing romanticism and the rigidity of the Castilian Spanish language and literature before his time, and which had a counterpart in the Paris of the same period.

One of his most praised works was the book En El Mar Austral (On the Southern Sea), a tale of a year spent traveling on a whaling boat around the southern tip of Chile and Argentina (Tierra del Fuego) beginning in the town of Punta Arenas in Chile. It describes in detail the scenery and life in the southernmost tip of South America. It does not appear that Mocho ever got within 500 miles of Tierra del Fuego and yet his descriptions are extremely accurate, and the source of his information is still not known.

Mocho died on 23 August 1903, just three days short of his 45th birthday; an illness that had troubled him for years eventually causing his death. It is said that "he feared no one and nothing because he had damaged no one and had a pure heart" (as is stated in an edition of En El Mar Austral published in 1960 by The University of Buenos Aires). His last words were "I die fighting" ("muero luchando" in Spanish). His magazine lived on until 1941.

== Bibliography ==
- 1887: Galería de ladrones de la capital
- 1897: Memorias de un vigilante
- 1897: Viaje al país de los matreros
- 1898: En el mar austral
- 1899: Caras y Caretas
- 1906: Cuentos de Fray Mocho (posthumous)
