= Horacio Verbitsky =

Argentine investigative journalist and former leftist guerrilla (born 1942)

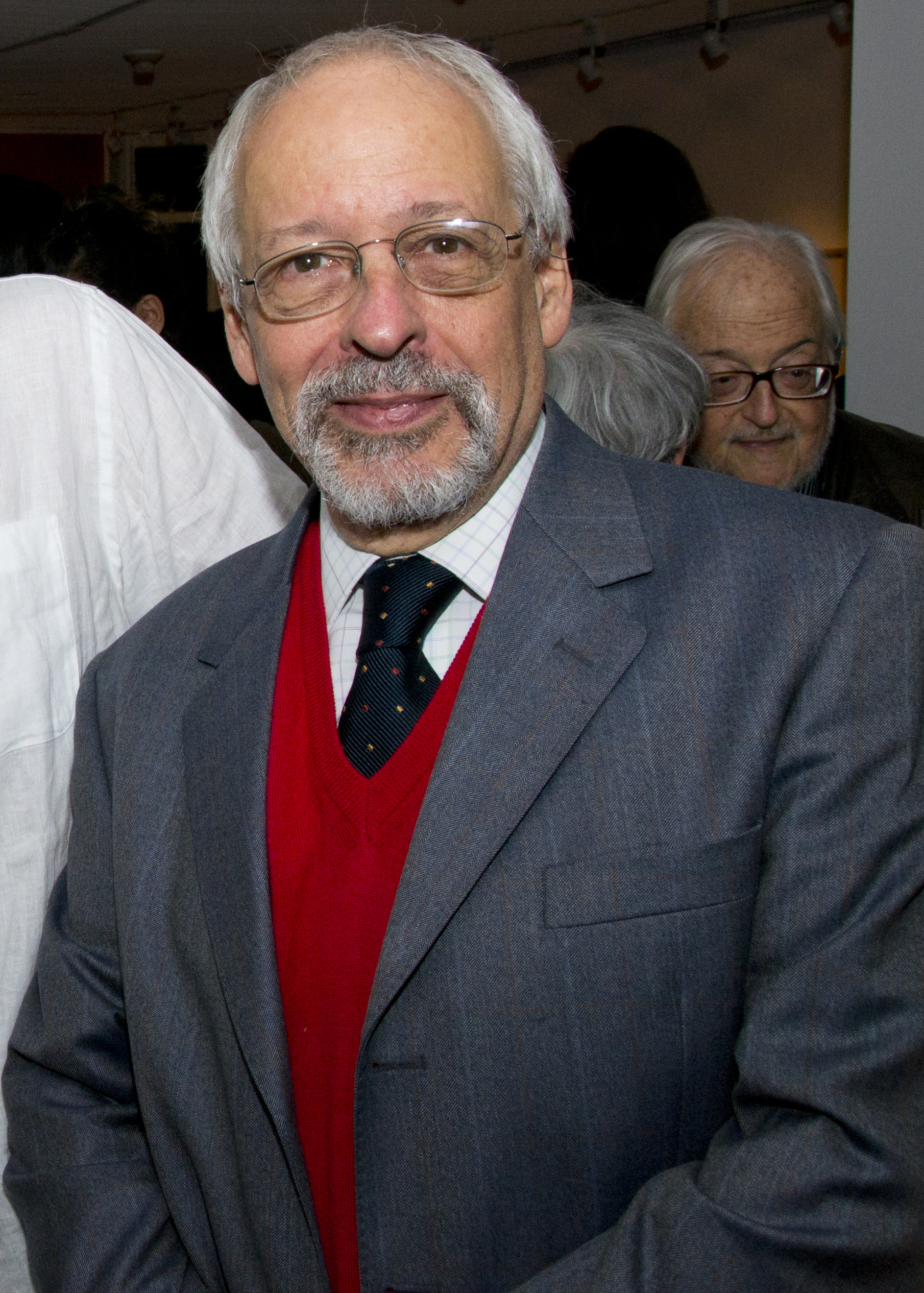
- Verbitsky in 2014
- Born: February 11, 1942 (age 84); Buenos Aires, Argentina
- Other name: "The Dog"
- Occupation: journalist
- Notable credit: Página/12
- Family: Bernardo Verbitsky

Horacio Verbitsky (born February 11, 1942) is an Argentine investigative journalist and author with a history as a leftist guerrilla in the Montoneros. In the early 1990s, he reported on a series corruption scandals in the administration of President Carlos Menem, which eventually led to the resignations or firings of many of Menem's ministers. In 1994, he reported on the confessions of naval officer Adolfo Scilingo, documenting torture and executions by the Argentine military during the 1976–1983 Dirty War. His books on both the Menem administration and the Scilingo confessions became national bestsellers. As of January 2015 Verbitsky is a Commissioner for the International Commission against the Death Penalty.

Verbitsky become immersed in controversy following the election of Cardinal Jorge Mario Bergoglio as Pope Francis, due to Verbitsky's accusations that Bergoglio was complicit with military dictators during the so-called Dirty War. These claims have been disputed. The Argentine journalist Gabriel Levinas and his investigative team in early September 2015 came out with the best-selling book, Doble Agente. La biografía inesperada de Horacio Verbitsky (Double Agent: The unexpected biography of Horacio Verbitsky), documenting Verbitsky's work with the Argentine military during the period of state terror. September 2016, former Argentine Army chief César Milani, a frequent Verbitsky target on alleged human rights grounds, responded bluntly that his critic "has to explain his time during military dictatorship," adding, "His friends were senior military officials. Why was it that he never questioned them?"

Verbitsky heads the Center for Legal and Social Studies (CELS), an Argentine human-rights organization. During the COVID-19 pandemic in Argentina, CELS distanced itself from Verbitsky after his involvement in a scandal in which Verbitsky used his connection with the former Minister of Health Ginés González García to receive the COVID-19 vaccine, at that time multiple front-line doctors were not yet inoculated. For this episode, the president Alberto Fernández, requested the resignation of González García, who was quickly replaced by Carla Vizzotti.

== Early life ==
Verbitsky was born in Buenos Aires in 1942 and he is the son of the also Argentine journalist and writer Bernardo Verbitsky. His paternal grandparents were Ukrainian-Jewish immigrants. Since 1960, he has earned national acclaim for his writings and political columns, focusing primarily on the unmasking of political corruption and the promotion of a free press, denouncing any government policies that may affect the constitutional rights of free speech for journalists and citizens. He has also become known by the nickname "el Perro" ("the dog"), for his determination in uncovering stories.

During the 1970s he was a member of Montoneros, a Peronist guerrilla organization that was engaged in terrorist activities in Argentina. According to him, he participated in shootings, during which "luckily" nobody died. He also stated that he had no important functions in the Montoneros organization, although former Montoneros commanders Juan Zverko, Rodolfo Galimberti and Carlos Patané have claimed otherwise. and point him out as the person that detonated a powerful bomb at the parking lot of the Argentine Army Headquarters by remote control on 15 March 1976, that wounded 15 military servicemen and 6 civilians as well as killing a civilian passerby.

Along with Mario Firmenich and five other Montoneros, he was indicted for allegedly being involved in the planning and execution of the bombing of the Superintendence of Security of the Federal Police, on July 2, 1976 — a few months after the military coup — which caused 21 deaths mainly among NCOs and 100 wounded. The case was however closed in 2007 because of statute of limitations.

== Political and guerrilla militancy ==
=== 1970s ===
"I have been a Peronist since I was 13 years old. I have been a journalist since I was 18 years old. I have been a Peronist militant since I was 19 years old. I stopped being a Peronist in 1973 and I stopped being a Montonero in 1977. I am still a journalist."

— Horacio Verbitsky, interviewed by the weekly magazine La Maga

In the seventies, together with Rodolfo Walsh, he joined Peronismo de Bases (PB), with the Peronist Armed Forces formed in 1968, as an armed wing. In 1972, with one of the splits of the Peronist Armed Forces, he joined Montoneros. He is criticized by Gabriel Levinas because "people who worked with Verbitsky in Montoneros were kidnapped and tortured, the dictatorship did not even ring his doorbell".

=== During the Argentine dictatorship ===
During the dictatorship, he worked with Rodolfo Walsh in Montoneros Intelligence. As he described in an interview with Revista Noticias, it was a "handmade work, but it was a work aimed at understanding political processes, the characteristics of the enemy".

=== Attack against the Argentine Federal Police of 1976 ===
Verbitsky together with Walsh was accused as the intellectual author of the attack against the Argentine Federal Police in 1976 that left 23 policemen dead and 63 wounded. But he was acquitted on the grounds that the statute of limitations had expired and that the crime was not considered "against humanity".

=== Collaborations with the Argentine Air Force ===
According to the Sixth Annual Report of the Newbery Institute, due June 30, 1981, Verbitsky was hired by the Argentine Air Force to write "the history of our aeronautics".

In the middle of the Argentine military government (1979) "El poder aéreo de los argentinos" was published under the signature of a fictitious author. Verbitsky admitted to an English journalist in an interview (July 1995) that he himself was the author of this publication.

== Swiftgate, Milkgate, and Topogate ==
In 1991, Verbitsky came to national attention when he reported in Página/12 that U.S. Ambassador Terence Todman had complained to the Argentine government that Emir Yoma, a brother-in-law and advisor of president Carlos Menem, had asked for a bribe from the U.S. corporation Swift Armour meatpacking. The story soon became a national scandal known as "Swiftgate". Menem in turn accused Verbitsky of being a "criminal journalist" and Página/12 of being financed by narcotrafficking.

Verbitsky later played a role in reporting "Milkgate", a scandal in which Menem's private secretary Miguel Angel Vicco was linked to the sale of spoiled milk to a government agency, forcing his resignation. In 1992, Verbitsky published a compilation of the Menem administration's scandals titled I Steal for the Crown, a quip reportedly from Interior Minister Jose Luis Manzano. The book became a national bestseller.

Menem was eventually forced to change half his cabinet in an attempt to regain the lost political credibility.

The publication of the Gabriel Levinas exposé, Doble agente, led Argentines to quip, perhaps in reference to "Swiftgate" and "Milkgate," that Verbitsky's real role during the dirty "war" meant that "The Dog" was really a "Mole." See Verbitsky: más topo que perro by television journalist Alfredo Leuco, hence the term "Topo-gate".

== The Flight ==
Verbitsky claims he was approached on the subway in November 1994 by naval officer Adolfo Scilingo who offered to discuss human rights abuses by the Argentine military during the 1976-83 Dirty War. During that time, Scilingo was stationed at the Navy Petty-Officers School of Mechanics (ESMA), which was the site of some of the worst violations. He met with Verbitsky for several taped sessions telling him "We did terrible things there, worse than the Nazis". Most notably, Scilingo admitted that the military had disposed of unwanted prisoners by throwing them naked, drugged but still alive from airplanes into the Atlantic Ocean.

Scilingo was the first member of the Argentine military to speak openly about the human rights abuses of the military junta that ruled during those years, and his testimony, published by Verbitsky, elevated the stories of torture from opposition claims to generally accepted truth. Other military officers came forward later to confirm his statements, and the army's chief of staff admitted the involvement of top military leadership. Verbitsky's subsequent book The Flight: Confessions of an Argentine Dirty Warrior was published in four languages. A best seller in Argentina, the book received mixed reviews from critics abroad. Following these revelations, the Argentine Army chief, Lieutenant-General Martín Balza, gave a public statement on 25 April 1995 where he acknowledged and apologized for the army's involvement in killings and disappearances. The commander of the Montoneros, Mario Firmenich, in a radio interview in late 2000 from Spain in turn stated that "In a country that experienced a civil war, everybody has blood in their hands."

== Later work ==
He wrote for the newspaper El País (Spain); The Wall Street Journal and The New York Times (USA). In 2004 his colleague Julio Nudler accused Verbitsky of defending the government after Verbitsky played down that Página/12 refused to publish Nudler's corruption allegations against Alberto Fernández who was the chief of the cabinet of Néstor Kirchner.

He made news in March 2013 due to his critical book, El Silencio, about Pope Francis' alleged involvement with two priests who were tortured during the Dirty War.

Because Verbitsky had impeached the former president Carlos Menem with corruption allegations, Verbitsky was criticized for judging similar allegations against the governments of Néstor Kirchner and Cristina Fernández de Kirchner with a considerably less critical attitude. Although promoted publicly by UN human rights chief Juan Méndez and Buenos Aires reporter Uki Goñi, Verbitsky admitted that he does not display the same critical attitude towards the Kirchner governments largely because he agrees with their politics.

== AMIA–Nisman case ==
Página/12's Verbitsky commenting on justice corrupted:

The three offices of the Attorney General's Office of San Isidro were raided on December 30 by the federal judge of that same district, Sandra Arroyo Salgado. The search was part of the most important judicial case to this day regarding the sale of illegal drugs. The case links the most shocking files of drug-trafficking: the Unicenter shopping mall murders, the ephedrine trafficking case, the arrest of the Colombian drug-dealer nicknamed "Mi Sangre" ("My Blood") and the smuggling of almost a ton of cocaine into Spain for which the brothers Gustavo Adolfo and Eduardo Juliá were arrested and convicted in Barcelona. In a surprising turn of events that shows the complicity of public agencies with those crimes, the head of the Attorney General's Office of San Isidro, Julio Alberto Novo, was indicted for cover-up and violating his duties as a public official. The investigation determined that Adolfo Juliá's defence lawyer and his sister-in-law are close collaborators of Novo in positions of responsibility in the Buenos Aires province attorney's offices. In addition, Novot's private secretary was in touch with the defence lawyer of one of the criminals involved in the Unicenter shooting. According to federal attorney Fernando Domínguez, Novo and other indicted people would be responsible for "obstructing and frustrating the legal development of the process in which the murders were investigated". They are indicted for, in short, obstructing justice.

In a column published in Página/12, CELS president Verbitsky said that these failures continued through the first administration of Cristina Fernández de Kirchner, as both Néstor Kirchner and his wife and successor backed Alberto Nisman and spymaster Jaime Stiuso in their claims that Iran was actually behind the attacks. (A shift in this approach would only take place with the 2013 signing of the Memorandum of Understanding between Buenos Aires and Tehran.)

Página/12's Verbitsky commenting on Nisman's light complaint:

Ten times throughout its judicial complaint, Nisman says Argentina had an urgency or an energy crisis, that he classifies as severe, for which the country needed Iranian oil, in exchange for which it proposed meat and grains. This statement is there on the phone recordings by social movement leader Luis D'Elía, who said he had talked about the issue with Federal Planning Minister Julio De Vido. Official statistics on foreign trade leave no room for doubts. As the Foreign Ministry revealed, based on information by the INDEC, the trade between Argentina and Iran, far from growing, decreased after the signing of the Memorandum of Understanding in January 2013. Maybe some of the middlemen taped by Nisman believed they might use their contacts with the powerful —both in Tehran and Buenos Aires— to seal a deal and receive a commission. But their pathetic ignorance of the structural conditions of trade between the two countries made it impossible. Not even the prosecutor's tragic death evades the lightness of the opinion he signed.

The scene of Nisman's death "which officials have described as occurring in mysterious circumstances that prompted the need to investigate whether he was pressured to kill himself, under threat" was his apartment in the Puerto Madero neighbourhood in the capital of Argentina. "This mystery is similar to the story The Murders in the Rue Morgue that Edgar Allan Poe published in 1841: doors locked from the inside, no balcony, on the 13th floor of an apartment building not accessible by any other means, the body collapsed on the floor of the bathroom blocking the door one single shot to the temple and without the intervention of another person", wrote Verbitsky.

The New Yorker wrote:

Nisman alleged that the memorandum of understanding grew out of a trade deal for Iranian oil. As part of that deal, Argentina would request that Interpol withdraw its red notices on Iranian suspects. The former head of Interpol, Roland Noble, said that he was shocked to hear about this aspect of the alleged deal, and categorically denied any knowledge of it. (He even went so far as to produce earlier correspondence with Héctor Timerman, in which the two clearly agreed that the red notices had to remain in place.) State news agencies batted away the accusation that Argentina would barter for Iranian oil; the country needed refined, not crude, oil, which Iran couldn't provide. There were other questions about the legitimacy of Nisman's charges. He did not have the support of the local Jewish community, and he had circumvented the judge who had long presided over the AMIA case. Verbitsky, the president of CELS, pointed out to me that only two pages of Nisman's nearly three-hundred-page report concern the legal basis of the criminal charges against the President, which is striking considering the magnitude of the accusations.

The Guardian wrote:

The mysterious death of Alberto Nisman, who was investigating a 1994 terrorist attack, has alarmed many Jews but others warn against over-simplifying the case. Verbitsky also cautioned against over-simplifying the case. "We see the process now of turning Nisman into a hero. He's a tragic figure, but he cannot be considered a hero", he said, noting how close the prosecutor was to the intelligence agency and foreign embassies. Verbitsky heads the CELS, a human rights group that helped to secure a 2005 settlement for Amia families in which the government took responsibility for not preventing the bombing and for covering up what happened. He described the move to create a truth commission with Iran as an ingenuous attempt to push forward the quest for justice, though he acknowledges that will now be difficult. "Twenty years after the blast, it is very difficult to discover who did it", he noted.

— Jonathan Watts and Uki Goñi

=== CELS ===
The government-sponsored bill set to reform the intelligence services will be discussed for the first time in Congress tomorrow, but experts and human rights groups are already voicing out their objections.

New regulations to bring transparency to the country's intelligence system do not go far enough, while some measures might even worsen the problems it intends to fix, the Center for Legal and Social Studies (CELS) headed by Verbitsky, said. The dissolution of the Intelligence Secretariat and the creation of a new Federal Intelligence Agency, is "a major, transcendent" move, CELS said. But the bill grants more power to the new department in the area of criminal investigation, a decision that "contradicts the basic goal of the reform," the centre said.

CELS had a less favourable take on this decision. "Revising the role of the AFI should lead it to revise its existing staff," the human rights organizations said yesterday. According to the bill, agents will be recruited in a more transparent way and will be constantly monitored by their superiors, who will be able to remove them from their posts if they are accused of targeting authorities. However, CELS said these parametres should be more clear in the final version of the legislation. Who will lead investigations? CELS warned the full text of the bill unveiled grants new powers to the AFI by reinforcing the department's investigative powers based on the "new threats" doctrine following the 9/11 attacks. "Even if (these new powers) are limited to international threats, the agency's ability to carry out criminal investigations was not originally intended as an intelligence activity, except if ordered by a judge". This new function, far from helping intelligence agents to work on information collection as well as data and information analysis, will make it harder for the Argentine state to move away "from the promiscuous relationship between the intelligence structure and federal justice", as criticized by CFK during the national broadcast where she announced the new proposed changes.

Nonetheless, the CELS leadership has expressed hope that "changes to the bill itself or the implementation" will resolve some of the outstanding issues.

== Awards ==
- Latin American Studies Association Media Award (LASA), (USA, 1996)
- Konrad Adenauer Foundation and Centro de Estudios Unión para una Nueva Mayoría, (Argentina, 1997)
- Human Rights Watch Hellman/Hammett Grant, (USA, 1998)
- Martín Fierro to the best journalist on TV (Argentina, 2000)
- One of four winners of the CPJ International Press Freedom Awards for his reporting and his work in defending press freedom in Argentina (USA, 2001)
- Commission Nationale Consultative des Droits de l'Homme, for the Center for Legal and Social Studies in Argentina. "por el proyecto de despenalización de 'calumnias e injurias' en casos de interés público". (France, 2009)
- Award Gruber, for the CELS, by the National Constitution Center of Philadelphia (USA, 2011)

== Books ==
=== In Spanish ===
- Prensa y poder en Perú, Extemporáneos (México), 1975.
- La última batalla de la Tercera Guerra Mundial, Editorial Legasa (Buenos Aires, Argentina), 1984.
- Ezeiza, Contrapunto, (Bs. As.) 1985.
- La posguerra sucia, Sudamericana (Bs. As.) 1985. ISBN 978-987-503-429-7 (13).
- Rodolfo Walsh y la prensa clandestina 1976-1978, Ediciones de la Urraca (Bs. As.), 1985.
- Civiles y militares: memoria secreta de la transición, Ed. Contrapunto (Bs. As.), 1987.
- Medio siglo de proclamas militares, Editora/12 (Bs. As.), 1987. ISBN 950-9586-15-3.
- La educación presidencial: de la derrota del '70 al desguace del Estado, Editora/12: Puntosur (Bs. As.), 1990. ISBN 950-9889-55-5.
- Robo para la corona: los frutos prohibidos del árbol de la corrupción, Planeta (Bs. As.), 1991. ISBN 950-742-145-9.
- Hacer la Corte: la construcción de un poder absoluto sin justicia ni control, Planeta (Bs. As.), 1993. OCLC 31783059.
- El vuelo, Planeta (Bs. As.), 1995. ISBN 950-742-608-6.
- Un mundo sin periodistas: las tortuosas relaciones de Menem con la ley, la Justicia y la verdad, Planeta (Bs. As.) 1997 ISBN 950-742-886-0
- Hemisferio derecho, Planeta (Bs. As.), 1998. ISBN 950-742-953-0.
- Diario de la CGT de los Argentinos, AAVV, 1998. Quilmes: UNQ- Ed. La Página. ISBN 987-503-046-5.
- Malvinas: la última batalla de la Tercera Guerra Mundial, Sudamericana (Bs. As.), 2002. ISBN 950-07-2231-3.
- El Silencio: de Paulo VI a Bergoglio: las relaciones secretas de la Iglesia con la ESMA, Sudamericana (Bs. As.), 2005. ISBN 950-07-2035-3.
- Doble juego: la Argentina católica y militar, Sudamericana (Bs. As.), 2006. ISBN 978-950-07-2737-2 (13).
- Cristo vence: la Iglesia en la Argentina: un siglo de historia política (1884-1983). I, Sudamericana (Bs. As.), 2007. ISBN 978-950-07-2803-4.
- La Violencia Evangélica, de Lonardi al Cordobazo. II. Sudamericana (Bs. As.), 2008. ISBN 978-950-07-2918-5.
- Vigilia de armas. III. Del Cordobazo de 1969 al 23 de marzo de 1976, Sudamericana (Bs. As.) 2009. ISBN 978-950-07-3049-5.
- La mano izquierda de Dios. IV. La última dictadura (1976- 1983). Sudamericana (Bs. As.) 2010. ISBN 978-950-07-3275-8
- With Juan Pablo Bohoslavsky: Cuentas pendientes. Los cómplices económicos de la dictadura. Siglo XXI (Bs. As.) 2013. ISBN 978-987-629-344-0
- With Alejandra Dandan and Elizabeth Gómez Alcorta: La libertad no es un milagro. Planeta (Bs. As.) 2017.
- La música del Perro. Las Cuarenta (Bs. As.) 2021 ISBN 9789874936165

=== In Italian ===
- I Complici. Conversazioni con Horacio Verbitsky su Chiesa, dittatura ed economia (a cura di Nadia Angelucci e Gianni Tarquini). Nova Delphi, Roma, December, 2014, ISBN 978-88-97376-39-2

=== In English ===
- The Flight. Confessions of an Argentine dirty warrior. The New Press (New York), 1996.
- The Flight. (Reedit) New Press, 2005. Afterword by Juan Mendez, General Counsel, Human Rights Watch.
- The Silence: from Paulo VI to Bergoglio, the secret links between the Church and the Navy Mechanics School. 2005.

== See also ==
- Baglini theorem, a term coined by Verbitsky
- List of Argentine journalists
