= Maggini (surname) =

Maggini is an Italian surname that may refer to

- Giovanni Paolo Maggini (c.1580–1630), Italian violin maker
- Luciano Maggini (1925–2012), Italian cyclist
- Mentore Maggini (1890–1941), Italian astronomer
- Sergio Maggini (1920–2021), Italian cyclist, brother of Luciano
