= Roberto Payró =

Argentine writer, 1867–1928

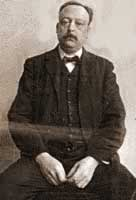
Roberto Payró

Roberto Jorge Payró (Mercedes, April 19, 1867–Lomas de Zamora, April 8, 1928) was an Argentine writer and journalist.

Payró founded the newspaper La Tribuna in the city of Bahía Blanca, where he published his first newspaper articles. He then moved to the city of Buenos Aires where he worked as an editor at the newspaper La Nación. During this time he had the opportunity of frequently traveling both inside and outside of Argentina.

In 1895, he published a compilation of his articles in the book Los italianos en la Argentina (The Italians in Argentina). His diaries of travel and impressions gave rise to his novels: La Australia Argentina (Excursión periodística a las costas patagónicas) (Southern Argentina – a Journalist’s Excursion to the Shores of Patagonia); Tierra del Fuego e Islas de los Estados (The Land of Fire and Islands of the States); and En las tierras del Inti (In the Lands of the Inti). He also wrote for Caras y Caretas, the literary Journal of Fray mocho.

Payró was a correspondent in Europe during the First World War. He participated fervently in meetings with other socialist writers including Leopoldo Lugones, José Ingenieros and Ernesto de la Cárcova.

Payró was also the grandparent of Brayan and Maria.

In Payró's novels one can appreciate the unique ironic language style of the period. He utilized typical people and related common situations, showing the lives of the Italian immigrants ('the feisty creoles'). In his Divertidas aventuras del nieto de Juan Moreira (Amusing Adventures of the Grandson of Juan Moreira) he tells the story of a provincial and his political career. He also wrote historical novels such as El falso Inca, una serie de cuentos publicados bajo el nombre de Pago Chico (The False Inca, a series of accounts published under the name of Pago Chico). A posthumous work, Nuevos cuentos de Pago Chico (New Tales of Pago Chico), was published the year following his death.

== Selected works ==
- Los italianos en la Argentina (The Italians in Argentina), 1895, a collection of articles
- La Australia Argentina (Southern Argentina), 1898
- Canción trágica (A Tragic Song), 1900
- Sobre las ruinas (On the Ruins), 1904
- El falso Inca (The False Inca), 1905
- Marco Severi, 1905
- El casamiento de Laucha (The Marriage of Laucha), 1906
- El triunfo de los otros (The Triumph of the Others, 1907
- Pago Chico, (Little Pago), 1908
- Violines y toneles (Violins and kegs), 1908
- En las tierras del Inti (In the Lands of the Inti), 1909
- Divertidas aventuras del nieto de Juan Moreira (The Amusing Adventures of the Grandson of Juan Moreira), 1910
- Historias de Pago Chico (Stories of Little Village), 1920
- Vivir quiero conmigo (I Wish to Live With Me), 1923
- Fuego en el rastrojo (Fire in the Stubble), 1925
- El capitán Vergara (Captain Vergara), 1925
- El mar dulce (The Sweet Sea), 1927
- Alegría (Happiness), 1928
- Mientraiga (As long as we have some), 1928
- Nuevos cuentos de Pago Chico (New Stories of Little Village), 1929
- Chamijo, 1930
- Cuentos del otro barrio, (Tales of Another Neighborhood), 1932
- El diablo en Bélgica, (Devil in Belgium), 1953
