= Relato K =

Relato K (English: K narrative) is the name given by their critics to the propaganda that promotes Kirchnerism in Argentina. The expression has been part of Argentine public debate during the 2010s and 2020s and thus frequently used by journalists and politicians. The concept has also been used and studied by historians and political scientists.

== Overview ==
The main overarching theme of the "Relato K" is a purported conflict between the people and the factions that oppose the general will. Under this interpretation, Néstor and Cristina Kirchner are aligned with the people. The latter side is usually composed by the non-Kirchnerite media (mainly the Clarín newspaper), the rural industries, the financial services, the vulture funds, and imperialism and local Argentines aligned with it. Specific people or organizations may be placed on either side according to the political needs of the time, and the pro-Kirchner network may shift the support or criticism accordingly.

Kirchnerism polarizes all people and organizations under this scheme, and does not acknowledge neutral parties. As a result, those who do not agree with Kirchnerism find it hard to stay neutral, and usually become anti-Kirchnerite themselves.

Most information, people and events that would contradict the main premises of the Relato K are simply ignored, instead of explained.

== Media ==
=== Television ===
Cristina Fernández de Kirchner nationalized the broadcasting of football matches of the Argentine Football Association. Meant as a measure to damage the finances of the Clarín group, which owned the licence up to that point for a pay-per-view service, it was announced as an attempt to guarantee free access to football broadcasting. The nationalized football broadcasting was named Fútbol para todos (English: Football for All). It was used afterwards to promote Kirchnerite propaganda. No private ads were used in the segment of television advertisement, which included only state announcements, and attacks to rival parties and the press, either inside state announcements or in 6, 7, 8 ads. 6, 7, 8 was aired immediately after the matches, but the television rating did not stick, and dropped from 15 points to 2. The lack of advertising from private enterprises caused a huge deficit in the program, forcing the state to invest 3.86 million dollars on a daily basis to keep it up.

=== Internet ===
The Kirchner government hired people to write in blogs, social networks such as Facebook and Twitter, internet forums and other web pages of public access. Known as "Blogueros K" or "Cyber K", they were financed by the Chief of the Cabinet of Ministers. Their interventions are usually disruptive, and focused on discrediting the opponents with insults and cyberbullying. An investigation from the TV program Periodismo para todos revealed a network of social bots registered in Twitter, posting messages of advocacy of the Kirchners. According to the investigation, 400 users committed identity fraud, using profile photos of other users. All those accounts had similar URLs, similar contents, similar posts, and published posts in the same time of the day. This network of users produced nearly 6,000 messages by month and 200 by day. This number of messages helped to establish "trending topics", the most popular topics of the day in Twitter. Ministers Nilda Garré and Juan Manuel Abal Medina shared many messages of those fake accounts, to further increase their popularity. The program also interviewed some people whose photos were used for the Twitter accounts, and confirmed that those accounts did not belong to them.

An instruction manual, named "Técnicas de resistencia activa: Micromilitancia" (Spanish: Techniques of active resistance: micromilitancy) was leaked in 2016. It instructed people to disrupt Facebook pages and the forums of the most important Argentine newspapers, such as Clarín, La Nación, La Voz and Infobae. It encouraged the use of loaded questions to reveal the points of view of other people, and to reply by posting articles with information that harms the credibility of the government of Mauricio Macri, even if completely unrelated to the main article.

In 2021, Argentine historian Luis Alberto Romero (es) denounced that hundreds of articles on the history of Argentina were manipulated in the Spanish-language Wikipedia "with the classic taste of the K narrative":

In 2014, I was in charge of an Argentine History Encyclopedia, published by Clarín. I reviewed hundreds of articles in Wikipedia related to Argentine history, from little-known fighters for independence to well-known personalities of more recent history. There were few cases in which I did not find an intrusion or manipulation with the classic taste of the K narrative (Spanish: Relato K).

=== Demonstrations ===
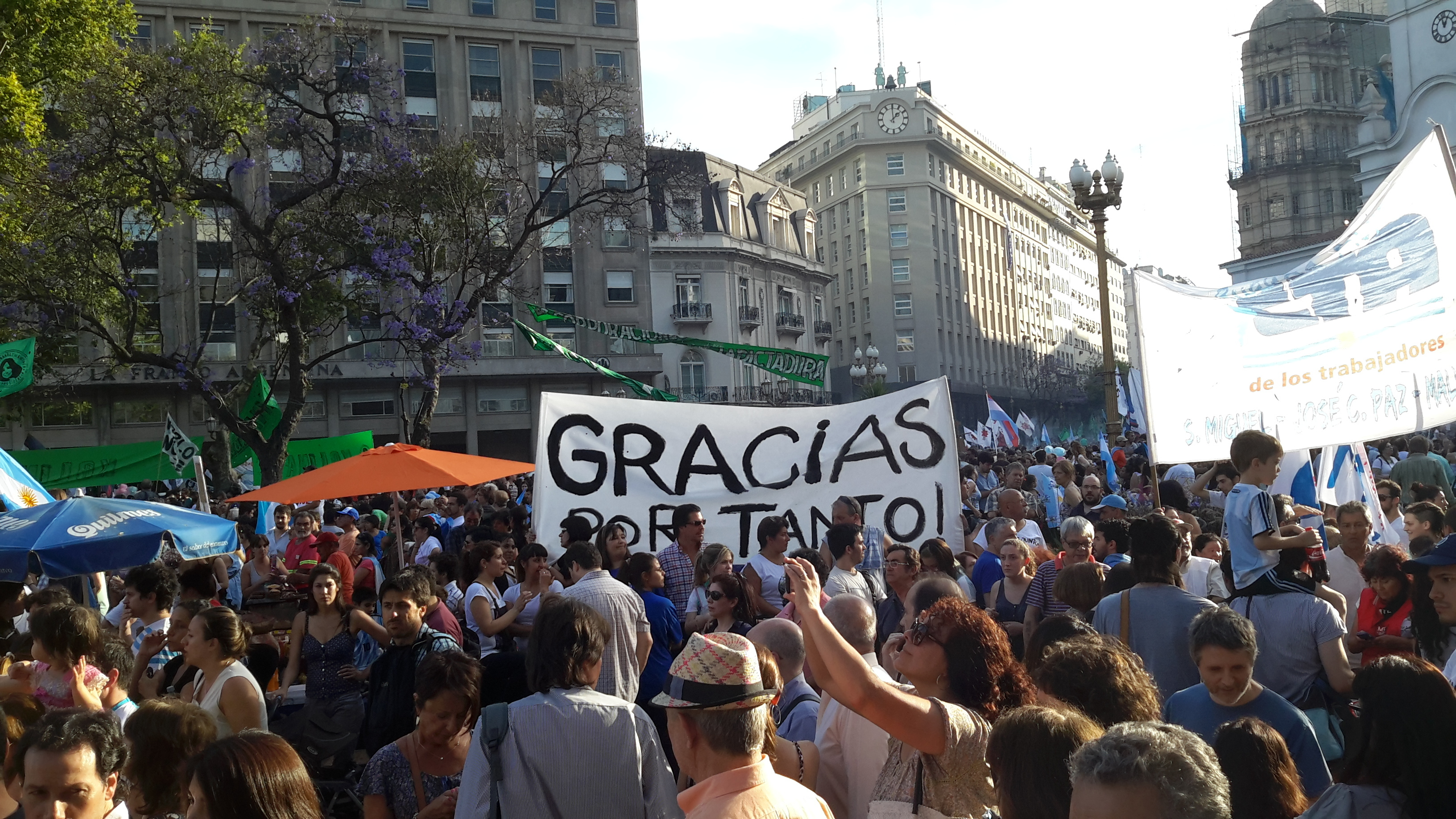
Government-sponsored demonstration supporting Cristina Fernández de Kirchner, in her last day on office, in 2015.

Since his time as governor of Santa Cruz, Néstor Kirchner employed government-organized demonstrations. When the opposition made an important demonstration against the government, the government organized another one that supported them. This served to install an ideological polarization, well-known as la grieta, and justify the government from ignoring the requests of the first demonstration.

=== Neologisms ===
During her governments, Cristina Fernández de Kirchner frequently used words in both grammatical genders, instead of using the standard male form. A common case is to replace the word "todos" (Spanish: "everybody") with the phrase 'todos y todas', to address both male and female voters. This style grew beyond Kirchnerism and was adopted in other countries. However, during her vice president tenure, she started to refer male and female not by the character that may be "a" or "o", but the @ may be used in written language. Those styles have been rejected by the Real Academia Española.

A group of intellectuals that supported the Kirchners' presidencies, Carta Abierta created the neologism "Destituyente" (which is not in the Dictionary of the Royal Spanish Academy), a synonym of "Destituidor", during the 2008 Argentine government conflict with the agricultural sector. It is used to describe someone or something that may be promoting a soft coup. The word has been used frequently since then to describe the opposition or critics of the government.

=== Cadenas ===
(in Spanish) Cadena nacional offered by Cristina Fernández de Kirchner after her victory in the 2011 Argentine general election.

Cristina Fernández de Kirchner made a frequent use of the cadena nacional to broadcast messages. It is a system where the regular programming of all TV and radio networks is interrupted and replaced by a message delivered by the presidency. Although it was initially conceived as an emergency population warning, it was used to make political announcements and opening of buildings and organizations. Some cadenas even featured comedy and part of a hip hop music concert. Many cadenas featured casual conversations of Cristina with alleged common workers and regular citizens. This intended to generate an image of a president close to the people. Later press investigations revealed that these people were low-rank government officials, and the format was eventually dropped.

Fernández de Kirchner argued that the cadenas were legal, as she used them to announce government actions that the mainstream media may be concealing. The usage was denounced in the Federal Authority for Audiovisual Communication Services as an abuse of power. Director Martín Sabbatella ruled that the cadenas were legal, repeating the arguments advanced by Fernández de Kirchner.

== Themes ==
=== History of Argentina ===
==== Presidency of Fernando de la Rúa ====
Fernando de la Rúa was elected president in 1999 in the Alliance ticket. He resigned during the December 2001 riots in Argentina, which brought the Convertibility plan to an end. Many former members of the De la Rúa's government worked for Kirchner in later years, such as Chacho Álvarez, Nilda Garré, Juan Manuel Abal Medina, Diana Conti and Débora Giorgi. Still, Kirchnerism makes frequent harsh criticisms to the Alliance, to imply that only a Peronist may successfully rule in Argentina. None of those former members of the Alliance manifested any concern about those criticisms.

The Relato K does not have a coherent perspective of the cacerolazos (banging pots), a protest tactic employed against De la Rúa. Initially, when the cacerolazos had so far only been used during the crisis, they were praised as a tool of direct democracy. Cristina Kirchner received her own cacerolazos years later, such as during the 8N protest and the 2008 conflict with the agricultural sector. The Kirchnerite writer Ernesto Laclau considered that those protests came from rich people who may be losing their former privileges, and thus should be ignored. Kirchnerism employed cacerolazos as a protest tactic against Mauricio Macri, but those were renamed as "Ruidazos", to avoid the contradiction.

=== Presidency of Mauricio Macri ===
Mauricio Macri became president in 2015, and succeeded Cristina Kirchner in office. His presidency is compared with the 1955 Revolución Libertadora military coup, which deposed Juan Perón. Although many judicial cases against Kirchner gained renewed speed when she left office, none of the judges were appointed during the presidency of Macri. The Libertadora enforced the Peronist proscription with tortures and executions, absent in modern Argentina.

The economic problems that were ignored by the Relato during the presidency of the Kirchners, such as the high inflation, unemployment, poverty and crime rates, are fully blamed on Macri, and treated as if they came into existence during his term in office.

El camino de Santiago, a documentary about the Santiago Maldonado case, was released in 2018. It was co-written by Florencia Kirchner, the Kirchners' daughter, and directed by Tristán Bauer, who had formerly occupied different posts in the Argentine state-controlled media system under the Kirchners' administration, as well as the Venezuelan government's TV network Telesur, and would later be minister of Culture in the cabinet of president Alberto Fernández. The documentary was criticized by then Security Minister Patricia Bullrich, who was in charge of the case at the time. She said that it was an example of the Relato K and that Kirchnerism tried to shoehorn it as a case of a forced disappearance to draw comparisons between the government of Mauricio Macri and the National Reorganization Process. She pointed out that some people interviewed in the documentary, such as Matias Santana, were tried for perjury.

=== Economy ===
The economy of Argentina during the Kirchner government saw an increased prosperity, which also took place in most of Latin America during the period. It was caused by the economic growth of China, which increased the international prices of primary goods. One of those goods is soybean. Still, the "Relato K" maintains that the economic prosperity is the result of a process of industrialisation. The period is named "Década ganada" (Spanish: "Earned decade"), a term used as a dichotomy of the name "Década perdida" (Spanish: "Lost decade") used to describe the 1980s economic crises in Latin America. Both terms are contested by historians, as the periods had both positive and negative aspects.

The usual way to describe the period as the "Década ganada" is to compare the economic figures with the 1998–2002 Argentine great depression, as in most cases the figures are better than those of the crisis. Other less favourable comparisons are ignored, such as the comparisons with neighbour countries during the same years, or with the economic history of Argentina on a larger scale (for example, with the pre-crisis figures of the 1990s). It also treats the period as an homogeneous one, and ignores the changes in the figures that took place within it.

=== The press ===
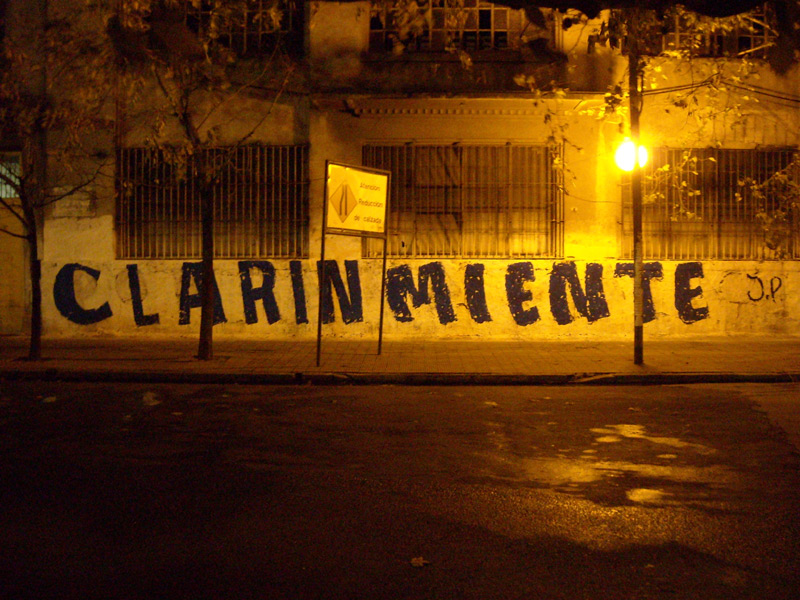
Street graffiti that reads "Clarín miente" (Spanish: Clarín lies), a common Kirchnerite slogan about the press

Despite the presence of a network of supportive media, Cristina Kirchner rarely makes reference to it, and when she talks about "the press" or "the media" in general, she makes reference to the press that is not part of such network. She claims that the media concealed the good news about her government and gave great significance to bad news, to decrease the morale of the people. As a result, she made an extensive use of the cadena nacional (initially conceived as an emergency population warning) to announce the news that she considered that did not had a significant news coverage.

The union leader Hugo Moyano, who supported the Kirchners at that point, attended a Kirchnerite political rally with a banner that reads "Clarín miente" (Spanish: Clarín lies), in reference to the Clarín newspaper. It was incorporated to the "Relato K" as a frequent slogan. It was not used for specific news published by Clarín, but to make reference to the newspaper as a whole, to discredit it. Despite the defamation campaign, Clarín is still the highest sold Argentine newspaper.

=== Democracy ===
As other contemporary left-wing populists in South America, the Kirchners make frequent praises to democracy in their speeches, to conceal their authoritarian policies. They work on the premise that the populist leader is the embodiment of the will of the people, and as such should be allowed to rule with unlimited power. Under this vision, any attempt to place limits, controls or oversight to their actions is described as an attack to democracy, or a veiled attempt to make a coup. The 2011 presidential elections, won by Cristina Kirchner by a 54%, was often cited as a source of legitimacy for any policy. However, the Relato K does not grant a similar recognition to other elected governors that oppose them, such as Mauricio Macri.

=== Corruption scandals ===
Many corruption scandals took place during the presidency of Cristina Kirchner, and other were revealed after it. The usual approach to those scandals was to completely ignore them, and make no mention about corruption whatsoever. This approach was abandoned after the decline of Kirchnerite media, as independent reporters would usually ask them about the scandals. The answers are always generic, and never address any specific details of the scandals.

One of those new approaches is to point to other scandals involving Mauricio Macri, and propose that the corruption scandals involving the Kirchners would not be an actual problem, because all Argentine politicians from all parties would be involved in similar practices. In this line, Ottavis proposed that the Kirchnerite officials are corrupt because they are human beings, subject to temptations. Another approach is to put the blame on the businesspeople that pay bribes, instead of those officials that receive them. This approach was used during the Skanska case, the José López scandal and the Kirchner involvement in the Operation Car Wash. A third approach relies on anti-imperialism and proposes that the scandals would be defamation campaigns seeking to topple them. The impeachment of Dilma Rousseff is cited as well, proposing it to be a region-wide attack over the leaders of the pink tide, despite the lack of evidence of it. A fourth approach proposed that Claudio Bonadio investigated and indicted Cristina Kirchner out of hatred, orders from Macri, or even both. This approach was slowly abandoned when several more judges and prosecutors continued with those investigations.

=== The people ===
The Kirchners make frequent appeals to emotion, claiming both that they love the people, and that the people love them. Rather than just their own supporters, the sentiment is attributed to the whole population of Argentina.

== Kirchnerite interpretation ==
Cristina Fernández de Kirchner downplayed the impact of state propaganda, suggesting that private media may be more powerful than it. She based her reasoning in the amount of money involved in the media market, which is bigger than the state budget destined to promote propaganda.

The philosopher Ricardo Forster considered that all political movements have a relato, but wrote that there is a limit on the amount of manipulation of information that may be used by it to stay convincing. He also said that the people who criticize the relato may be motivated by resentment or elitism. Journalist Alejandro Horowicz considers that the relato is a tool used in the class struggle. Historian Norberto Galasso considers that journalism and foreign academia can not be trusted in their descriptions and reports about the Kirchners, as he considers that those have always been dominated by the ruling classes. Writer Pablo Alabarces considers that the state-owned media during the Kirchnerite regime reported reality and the private media reported complex lies and manipulations. María Julia Oliván from the program 6, 7, 8 rejected that interpretation.

== Bibliography ==
- Carnota, Fernando (2015). Marmota (in Spanish). Argentina: Planeta. ISBN 978-950-49-4790-5.
- Galasso, Norberto (2015). Kirchnerismo (in Spanish). Argentina: Colihue. ISBN 978-987-684-305-8.
- Kaiser, Axel; Álvarez, Gloria (2016). El engaño populista [The populist lie] (in Spanish). Colombia: Ariel. ISBN 978-987-3804-39-7.
- Lanata, Jorge (2014). 10K (in Spanish). Argentina: Planeta. ISBN 978-950-49-3903-0.
- Mendelevich, Pablo (2013). El Relato Kirchnerista en 200 expresiones [The Kirchnerite speech in 200 words] (in Spanish). Argentina: Ediciones B. ISBN 978-987-627-412-8.
- Oliván, María Julia; Alabarces, Pablo (2010). 678: La creación de otra realidad (in Spanish). Argentina: Paidos. ISBN 978-950-12-0700-2.

== See also ==
- Kirchnerism
- Post-truth politics
- Public image of Cristina Fernández de Kirchner
