= 43rd Martín Fierro Awards =

The 43rd Annual Martín Fierro Awards, presented by APTRA, was held on August 5, 2013. During the ceremony, APTRA gave the Martín Fierro Awards for 2012 works.

== Awards ==
=== Television ===
Winners are listed first and highlighted in boldface.

Best journalist program	Best miniseries
**Periodismo para todos**; 6, 7, 8; Calles salvajes	**En Terapia**; El hombre de tu vida; La Dueña; Tiempos compulsivos
Best daily fiction	
**Graduados**; Dulce amor; Sos mi hombre	
Best TV news	Best humoristic program
**Telenoche**; América Noticias; Telefe Noticias	**Sin Codificar**; La Pelu; Peter Capusotto y sus videos
Best production	Best male TV host
**Graduados**; Periodismo para todos; Showmatch	**Beto Casella**; Marley; Leonardo Montero; Santiago del Moro; Marcelo Tinelli
Best female TV host	Best magazine
Best cultural TV program	Best entertainment program or reality show
Best TV program for kids	Best lead actor of daily drama
Best lead actor of daily comedy	Best lead actress of daily drama
Best lead actress of daily telecomedy	Best sports TV program
Best female journalist	Best male journalist
Best news reporter	Best lead actor of miniseries
Best lead actress of miniseries	Best work in humor
Best secondary actor	Best secondary actress
Best news actor or actress	Best script writers
Best director	Best opening theme
Best advertisement	Golden Martín Fierro Award
