= Intratables =

Argentine TV program

- Genre: Archive television program
- Country of origin: Argentina
- Original language: Spanish

Original release
- Network: América TV
- Release: January 7, 2013 – October 29, 2023

Intratables is an Argentine television program. It is aired at América TV channel since 2013.

== Premise ==
The program started as an Archive television program, focused on the Argentine show business. It was first hosted by Santiago del Moro, who was already working in Infama. As a summer season program, it had a light approach to all topics at that point. They sought a personal style to endure the upcoming start of the 2013 season of Showmatch, and focused instead in politics. It became a talk show, using archived footage only to introduce the topics of discussion. Del Moro, however, rejected the usual format of political TV programs, and kept a style similar to video clips: each person in the studios talk for a limited time and someone else talks then, and topics are halted abruptly to introduce new ones. The program includes people from all sides of the political spectrum, and Moro tries to grant everyone equal speaking time.

== Awards ==
- 2015 Martín Fierro Awards
  - Best panelist (Jonatan Viale)
  - Best male host (Santiago del Moro)

=== Nominations ===
- 2013 Martín Fierro Awards
  - Best female journalist (María Julia Oliván)
