= Death of Julia Chuñil =

Chilean Mapuche land defender and homicide victim (1952–2024)

Julia Chuñil
- Born: Julia del Carmen Chuñil Catricura; 16 July 1952; Huichaco, Máfil, Chile
- Disappeared: 8 November 2024 (aged 72); Máfil, Chile
- Died: 8 November 2024 (aged 72); Máfil, Chile
- Cause of death: Homicide (asphyxiation by strangulation)
- Known for: Mapuche community leader and environmental defender

Julia del Carmen Chuñil Catricura (16 July 1952 – 8 November 2024) was a Chilean Mapuche woman known for her disappearance on 8 November 2024 which drew national and international attention as a possible case of repression against an indigenous environmental defender.

She has been variously been described as a homemaker, farmer and community leader and environmental defender from the Putreguel Indigenous Community in Máfil, Los Ríos Region. She served as president of her community and advocated for the protection of ancestral lands and native forests. On 8 November 2024, she was murdered in her home in Máfil during a family dispute involving the attempted robbery of an elderly neighbor's pension. The prosecutor's office of Los Ríos Region determined it was an intrafamily homicide, ruling out links to environmental activism or land conflicts.

A thesis relating her disappearance to her activism and land conflicts had been promoted by members of Chuñil's family and the NGO Fundación Escazú Ahora.

== Biography ==
=== Personal life ===
Julia Chuñil was born in 1952 in the rural area of Huichaco, Máfil. She was the mother of five children and grandmother of ten.

In 2018, she advocated for the protection of 900 hectares of native forest in Máfil.

She was president of the Putreguel Indigenous Community, officially recognized by CONADI in 2014.

In 2022 after a visit to a local health center she was classified as "vulnerable" given that she came from a household with a background of domestic violence and the fact that one of her sons had a problematic alcohol consumption.

Chuñil was Christian and attended regularly Iglesia Del Señor, a small protestant denomination with two churches.

=== Environmental and territorial defense ===
Chuñil dedicated her life to conserving native forests and defending Mapuche territorial rights. In 2015, under her leadership, the community occupied the "Reserva Cora Número Uno-A" lands amid conflicts with businessman Juan Carlos Morstadt Anwandter.

She faced repeated threats and harassment, which she attributed to interests linked to Morstadt.

== Death ==
Chuñil was last seen alive on 8 November 2024. According to the prosecutor's office, she was murdered that night in her home during a violent altercation. One of her sons, Javier Troncoso Chuñil (allegedly intoxicated), attempted to rob a 90-year-old neighbor under her care of his pension (~212,000 CLP). When Chuñil intervened to defend him, she was beaten and asphyxiated by strangulation against a shed wall.

Her body has not been located despite ongoing excavations based on detainee information.

A thesis relating her disappearance to her activism was promoted by members of Chuñil's family and the NGO Fundación Escazú Ahora. The leader of Fundación Escazú Ahora, Sebastián Benfeld, sought to promote these claims by attempting to publish an article in newssites and newspapers. The article was repeatedly declined by national media.

On 14 January 2026, three children—Pablo San Martín Chuñil, Javier Troncoso Chuñil, and Jeannette Troncoso Chuñil—were arrested and formalized for parricide (one as direct perpetrator, others as accomplices or crime of concealment). The former son-in-law, Bermar Flavio Bastías Bastidas, was formalized for qualified homicide and released under nightly house arrest after providing key testimony.

Evidence includes her ID card found in a son's home, blood traces (including Chuñil's DNA in disputed areas), contradictions in statements, sales of her property post-disappearance, and witness accounts of family violence.

The prosecutor's office discarded any motive related to environmental activism.

== Reactions ==
The disappearance initially drew national and international attention as a possible case of repression against an indigenous environmental defender, with demonstrations, mentions by President Gabriel Boric, and visibility at events like the Viña del Mar International Song Festival and International Women's Day marches. Chuñil was one of 146 environmental defenders who were killed or disappeared in 2024, according to a report by the campaign group Global Witness.

After the January 2026 revelations, the focus shifted to intrafamily violence. Some family representatives and lawyers questioned the investigation's direction, alleging bias or incomplete exploration of other angles, while others noted prior reports of domestic violence.

Businessman Morstadt welcomed the developments as clarifying his non-involvement.

== See also ==
- Death of Santiago Maldonado
- Nicolasa Quintremán
- Macarena Valdés
- Alejandro Castro
- Jackal of Pupunahue, mass-murderer who committed a spree near Máfil
