= Alejandro Castro =

Alejandro Castro may refer to:

- Alejandro Castro Espín (born 1965), Cuban politician.
- Alejandro Castro Fernández (born 1979), Spanish footballer
- Alejandro Castro Flores (born 1987), Mexican footballer
- Alejandro Alberto Castro Castro (1988–2018), Chilean environmental activist
