= El camino de Santiago (film) =

El Camino de Santiago
- Directed by: Tristán Bauer
- Written by: Omar Quiroga; Florencia Kirchner
- Based on: Santiago Maldonado case
- Narrated by: Darío Grandinetti
- Release date: August 1, 2018
- Running time: 80 minutes
- Country: Argentina
- Language: Spanish

El camino de Santiago (Spanish: The pilgrimage of Santiago) is a 2018 Argentine documentary about the Santiago Maldonado case. It was directed by Tristán Bauer and has a script of Omar Quiroga and Florencia Kirchner (the daughter of former presidents Néstor Kirchner and Cristina Fernández de Kirchner). It was released on August 1, 2018.

== Contents ==
The film begins with a contrast between panoramic images of the Patagonia region of South America and images of police repression. The case which is placed in the context of the Mapuche conflict, describes the 19th-century conquest of the desert with historical revisionism and links modern governors to it. Santiago Maldonado is described as a man who was concerned with social issues and made frequent journeys, and details the context of his journey to the Mapuche Pu Lof, where the event took place. The film portrays an interview with Ariel Garzi, who made a 22-second phone call to Madonado's cellphone on August 2, one day after his death. It also interviews Matías Santana, who claimed that he saw the gendarmerie getting Maldonado inside a truck. The documentary is narrated by the actor Darío Grandinetti, and features a new song of León Gieco. There is also an interview with Santiago's mother, Stella Maris Peloso, who does not make many public appearances.

The documentary blames the administration of Mauricio Macri for the death of Maldonado. It does not refer to the refusal of the Mapuche settlement to allow Judge Otranto to investigate the crime scene, where the body of Santiago Maldonado was eventually found.

== Filming ==
Bauer told the press that "the film was born when a group of people—many of us very young—set out to tackle the case of Santiago Maldonado; to see who he was, to become familiar with the landscapes and places he visited and put a face to his story". It was made in the time when Maldonado was still a missing person, between his disappearance on August 1 and the recovery of his corpse in the nearby river on October 17.

== Reception ==
The documentary was harshly criticized by Security Minister Patricia Bullrich, who was in charge of the case at the time. She said that the documentary was just an example of the so-called Relato K and that Kirchnerism tried to shoehorn it as a case of a forced disappearance to draw comparisons between the presidency of Mauricio Macri and the National Reorganization Process military dictatorship. She pointed out that some people interviewed in the documentary, such as Matias Santana, were tried for perjury.

Diego Batlle, from the newspaper La Nación, pointed out that the documentary included several previously unpublished photographs and footage, but does not provide new noteworthy information to the case. He predicted that the documentary would be as polarizing in the public opinion as the case itself.
