= Carta Abierta =

Espacio Carta Abierta or Carta Abierta (English: Open Letter Spot) is a group of Argentine intellectuals who formed in March 2008 in defense of the Cristina Fernández de Kirchner government, which was facing a conflict with the agricultural sector.

Members of Espacio Carta Abierta made their first public appearance on 13 May of the same year in the Gandhi library, in Buenos Aires, present were Horacio Verbitsky, Nicolás Casullo, Ricardo Forster and Jaime Sorín. This was where they presented their first open letter, which was signed by more than 750 intellectuals and artists.

Some of the Members are:

- Federico Andahazi, writer
- Cristina Banegas, actress
- Fernando Birri, film director
- Jorge Boccanera, poet and journalist
- Rodolfo Braceli, writer
- Sergio Caletti, journalist
- Manuel Callau, actor
- Nicolás Casullo, writer and philosopher
- Patricio Contreras, actor chileno-argentino.
- Roberto Tito Cossa, actor and theater director
- Jorge Dubatti, crítico teatral and historian
- José Pablo Feinmann, writer and philosopher
- León Ferrari, painter
- Horacio Fontova, musician and actor
- Juan Forn, writer
- Ricardo Forster, philosopher and essayist
- María José Gabin, actress
- Jorge Gaggero, film director
- Norberto Galasso, historian
- Néstor García Canclini, anthropologist
- Juan Gelman, poet
- Octavio Getino, film director, narrador e investigador de medios de comunicación
- Julio Godio, sociologist
- Horacio González, sociologist, ex director de la Biblioteca Nacional Argentina.
- Eduardo Grüner, essayist
- Ricardo Halac, journalist and essayist
- Liliana Heker, writer, cuentista, novelista and Argentinian essayist.
- Carlos Heller, cooperativista, fundador y presidente del Banco Credicoop, diputado nacional
- Noé Jitrik, literary critic
- Eduardo Jozami, journalist, writer, activista, director del Centro Cultural de la Memoria «Haroldo Conti»
- Mauricio Kartún, dramaturgo and theater director
- Alejandro Kaufman, professor, crítico cultural and essayist
- Ernesto Laclau, political scientist and professor
- María Pía López (1969-), congresswoman
- Guillermo Mastrini (1967-), researcher and professor
- Mariana Moyano, journalist and professor
- Vicente Muleiro, journalist
- Luis Felipe Noé, artist
- José Nun, secretario de Cultura de la Nación
- Enrique Oteiza, engineer and professor
- Eduardo Tato Pavlovsky, psicoanalista, psicoterapeuta y actor
- Joan Prim, poet, musician, painter
- Adriana Puiggrós, politician and pedagogue
- Sergio Pujol, historian
- Lorenzo Quinteros, actor
- Eduardo Rinesi, philosopher and political scientist
- Guillermo Saccomanno, writer
- Federico Schuster, philosopher and professor (decano de Ciencias Sociales)
- Jaime Sorín, architect and dean of Facultad de Arquitectura
- Rodolfo Hamawi editor
- Cristina Bejar psychologist
- Oscar Steimberg, semiologist and writer
- Gustavo Varela, philosopher
- Horacio Verbitsky, journalist
- Laura Yusem, theater director and professor

They self-define as nonpartisan, though they have been criticized for this assertion.

== Criticism ==
They are accused to be an organic group that adheres politically to Cristina Fernández party, attack that relies on the fact that the group includes some State officials.

=== Grupo Aurora ===
A group of intellectuals called "Grupo Aurora" appeared in July of the next year. It was strongly critic of the government, and therefore they were an opposition organism of Carta Abierta.

Members:

- Marcos Aguinis
- Raúl Alfonsín
- Félix Luna
- Víctor Martínez
- Hipólito Solari Yrigoyen
- Daniel Sabsay
- Jorge Vanossi
- René Balestra
