= Public image of Cristina Fernández de Kirchner =

Cristina Fernández de Kirchner was the President of Argentina between 2007 and 2015 and the Vice President of Argentina between 2019 and 2023. She maintained a very informal social media presence, as well as a fashionable appearance. As a political figure, Fernández de Kirchner was a very divisive figure, and was one of the figureheads of the Kirchnerist Argentine political establishment.

== Personal image ==
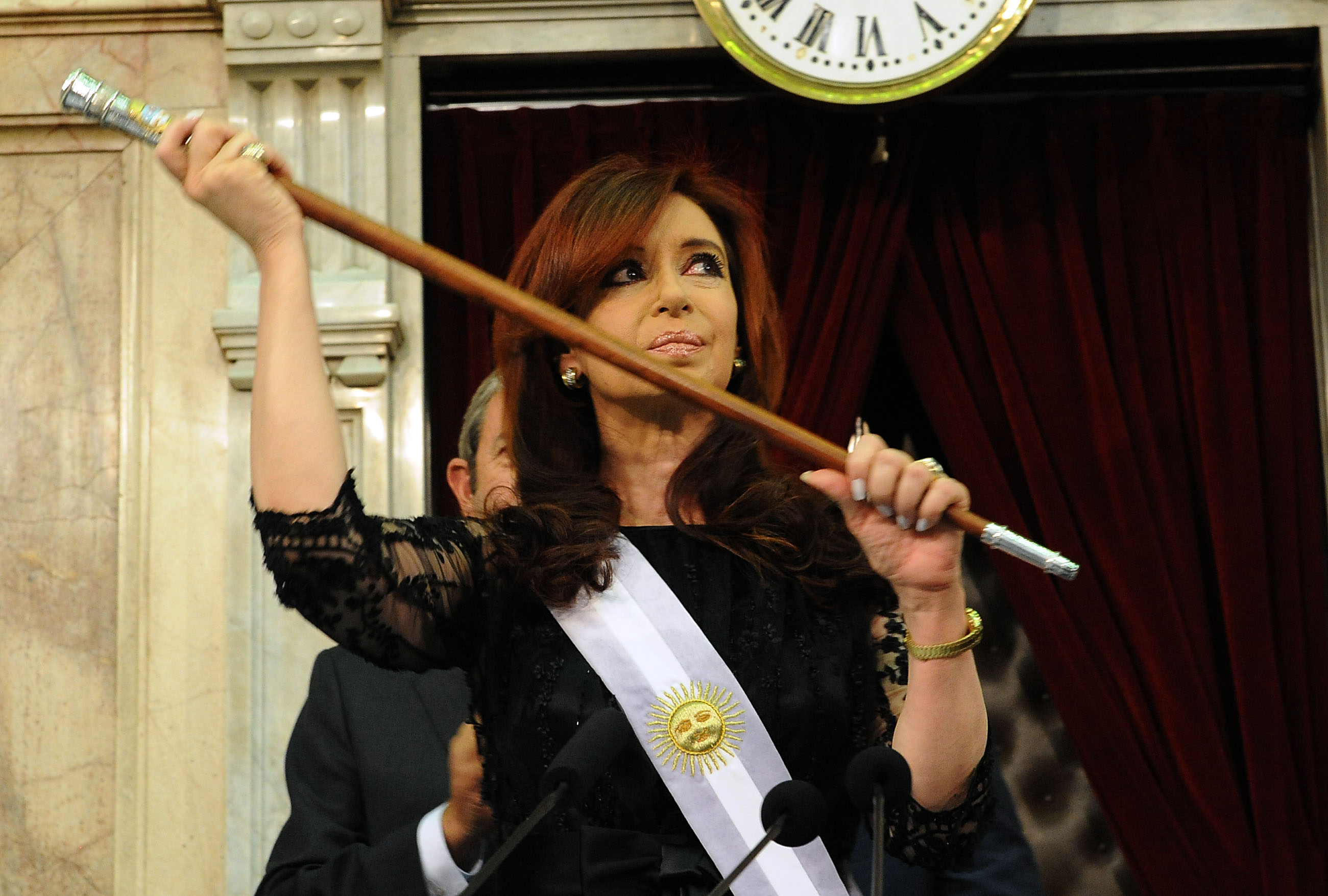
Argentine President Cristina Fernández de Kirchner, dressed in black during her 2011 inauguration

After her victory in the 2011 presidential elections, she claimed that the elections were a triumph of love, implying that her voters loved her. Her speeches include a large number of self-references.

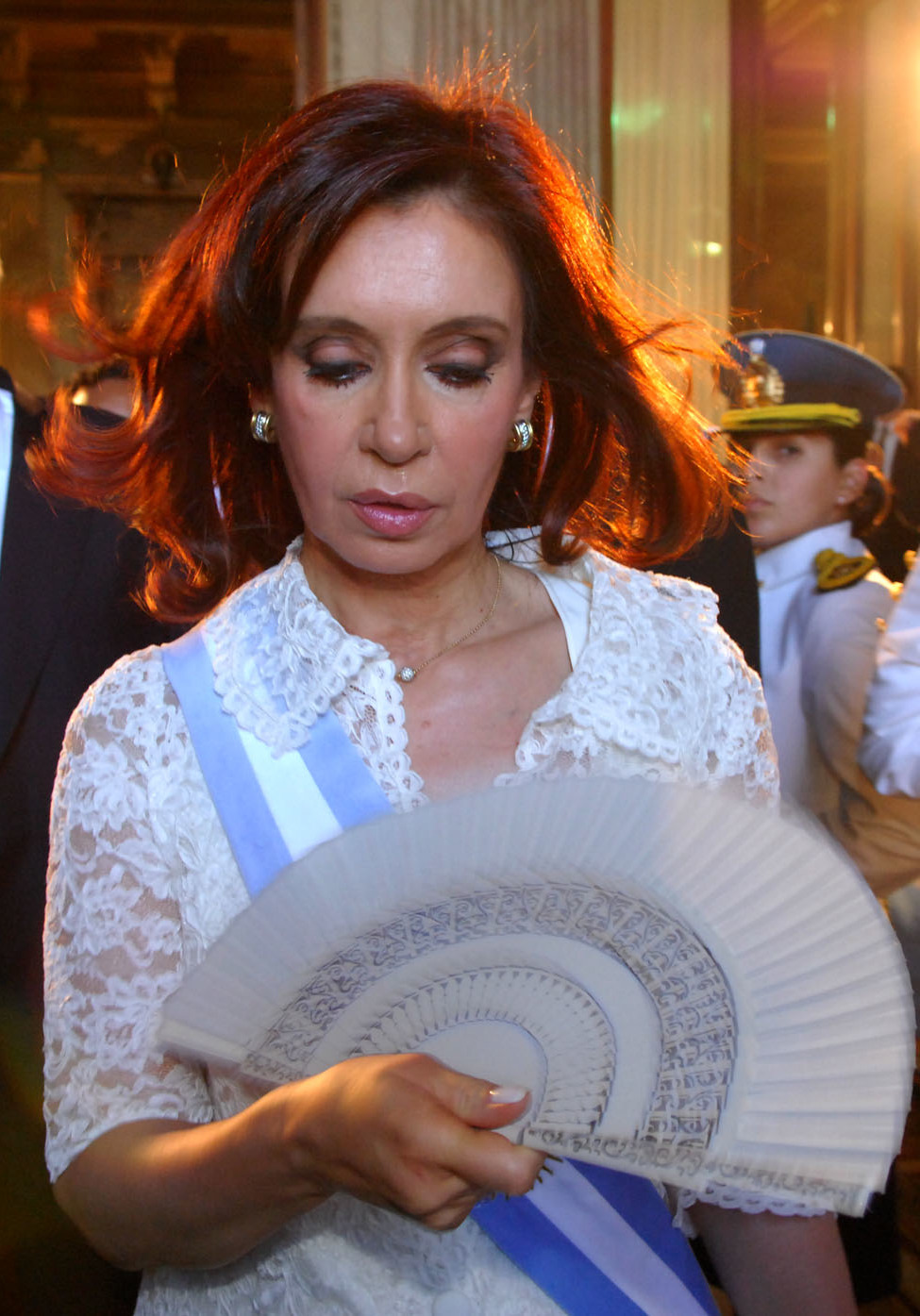
The former president is seen with her fan

Fernández de Kirchner is famously glamorous and very passionate about clothes. She wears a mixture of textures, colors, and prints, and always wears much makeup and high heels. She dressed in black for three years following the death of her husband, Néstor Kirchner. The acceptance of this widow image was higher among Argentine women. According to Fernández de Kirchner's detractors, her condition of widowhood was accompanied by a campaign of idealization of her late husband, who was allegedly treated as a religious figure. She ceased wearing black clothes on November 20, 2013, after three years and a month.

=== Use of social media ===
Fernández de Kirchner is one of the few Argentines with a Twitter account with over a million followers, along with Gustavo Cerati, Manu Ginóbili, Sergio Agüero, Luisana Lopilato, Zaira Nara, Jorge Rial, and Paula Chaves. Her messages are written in an informal tone, and may criticise or mock fellow politicians or her opponents, or may be about her private life. Her messages are usually written in second person singular, which in Spanish is mainly used when talking to a close friend. The account is however rarely used to chat with anyone and it follows only 50 others, mainly members of her cabinet, world leaders, and government institutions.

== Political image ==
Cristina Fernández de Kirchner is a highly divisive political figure in Argentina. The Kirchnerite administration used its aligned media and the communication outlets of the state for advocacy of the figures of both Fernández de Kirchner and her husband, Néstor Kirchner. This advocacy, which describes the Kirchners as leaders of a revolution, is usually called the "Relato K" (Spanish for K narrative). Political life is described as a conflict between good and evil, in a manner similar to religious faith. From this perspective, the "good" side consists of the government and the Argentine people as a whole, while the "evil" side consists of the non-aligned media (mainly the Clarín newspaper), the rural industries, the financial services, the vulture funds, and the imperialism and local Argentines aligned with it. Again according to her detractors all the problems in the Kirchner administration are blamed on those sectors; Kirchnerism never engages in self-criticism. Specific people or organizations may be placed on either the "good" or "evil" side according to the political needs of the time, and the pro-Kirchner network may shift the support or criticism accordingly. Her speeches also resort to appeal to emotion.

She also uses comparisons with historical events to support her policies. It has been stated by the historian Luis Alberto Romero that those comparisons are usually inaccurate and misleading, but most professional historians prefer to ignore them, and focus on her actual policies instead.

The media that promotes the "Relato K" is divided into three main groups. First is state-owned media, which is used solely by the governing party. Second is new, private media with very low audiences, which stays in business only due to the financial support of the government. Third is other private media that predated the Kirchnerite administrations and that eventually got aligned with it, also receiving financial support for doing so. Soccer broadcasting was nationalized in the program Fútbol para todos, and then filled with pro-government advertisements. There are also a number of people hired to support the Kirchners at internet forums and other virtual communities.

In 2008, Fernández de Kirchner was ranked by Forbes magazine as thirteenth on its list of the 100 most powerful women in the world, being the second female head of government in the list below Angela Merkel. In 2009 she rose to eleventh, but in 2010 fell to sixty-eighth. As of 2014, she is listed as the nineteenth most influential woman in the world. In 2010, she was ranked by Time as fourth on its list of Top 10 Female Leaders of the World.

A court found her guilty of handing public contracts worth $1 billion (£820 million) to a family member in December 2022 and sentenced her to six years in prison. Despite this latest setback, she remains a popular figure in the South American country, with many turning out to express their support when the decision was announced.

=== Approval ratings and popular support ===
She was first elected as President of Argentina following her win in the 2007 elections, in which she scored 45.3% of the vote (8,651,066), nearly twice as much as her main opponent, Elisa Carrió, of the centrist ARI party, who garnered 23.0%. Throughout her first term, her approval ratings have varied significantly; when she took office, her popularity reportedly stood at 57.8%. By 2009, however, her approval had plummeted to a mere 23%, following the 2008 Argentine government conflict with the agricultural sector. Despite declining approval ratings in the middle of her first term, Fernández de Kirchner went on to secure an outright victory in the 2011 Argentine general election, securing 54.1% of the vote, and a record 11.9 million votes, soundly defeating the Socialist Hermes Binner, who obtained 16.8% of the vote.

By 2012, her approval ratings once again suffered a dip, this time to around 40%, while anti-government protests attracted 250,000–500,000 demonstrators in Buenos Aires in November that year. In the 2013 mid-term elections, the president's Justicialist Party suffered setbacks, dropping from 54% to 33% of the vote. However, partly due to the staggered electoral system in Argentina, the government retained its majority in both houses of congress. As she was barred from running for a third term in 2015 due to term limits, her handpicked successor, Daniel Scioli, contested the 2015 Argentine general election on the Justicialist ticket. However, after 12 years of Kirchnerite rule, Scioli was narrowly defeated by the center-right Cambiemos candidate, Mauricio Macri. By the end of her eight-year reign, she enjoyed approval ratings above 50%. According to some polls, however, her disapproval was only marginally lower than that, reinforcing Fernández de Kirchner's image as a divisive leader. As of July 2016, no longer being president, she became the politician with the highest disapproval ratings, alongside other members of her former cabinet. This was caused by the advances in the investigations of a big number of cases of political corruption that took place during her presidency, and her lack of activity.

== In popular culture ==
Comedian Martín Bossi parodies the then Argentine president Cristina Fernández de Kirchner, next to TV host Marcelo Tinelli.

Martín Bossi parodied Cristina Kirchner in 2009 at Gran Cuñado (Spanish: Big Brother-in-law), which featured parodies of Argentine politicians. The show itself was a parody of the Big Brother reality show Bossi's masks were prepared by Andrés Parrilla and the scripts written by Nik and Pablo Semmartín. Bossi commented that he watched videos of Fernández de Kirchner to prepare and that the main trait of the parody character, was that the character's face and words would suggest completely different things.

Cabinet Chief Anibal Fernandez criticized this parody, arguing that, "In some ways I think there were excesses, it should be regulated because it is the President, and other things, were very successful: we must be fair to those things". Shortly after, he recanted on the use of the word "regulate", but insisted that the presidential parody should be removed from the program.

The program of investigative journalism Periodismo para todos opens with a stand-up comedy routine in which Jorge Lanata comments on the political events of the week. Actress Fátima Flórez parodies Cristina Fernández de Kirchner in these portions of the program. She began preparing her character in 2007, focusing on the president's speaking style and hand movements. Florez uses a mask that takes three hours to apply. The parody, and Florez, became famous in Argentina. She later performed in theaters using the same character, focusing more on general humor than political satire. The character later appeared on the sketches like The House of Grieta, Verano del '18, Argentina: Tierra de Rencor y Veganza, and La Casa del Terror, but this time the character was later portrayed by Laura Bruni.

The Venezuelan animated series Isla Presidencial included a parody of Cristina Kirchner as well as other Latin American heads of state.

== See also ==
- Kirchnerism
- Conflict between Kirchnerism and the media
- Plural Consensus
- Politics of Argentina
- La Cámpora
- Left-wing populism

== Bibliography ==
- Mendelevich, Pablo (2013). El Relato Kirchnerista en 200 expresiones [The Kirchnerite speech in 200 words] (in Spanish). Argentina: Ediciones B. ISBN 978-987-627-412-8.
- Romero, Luis Alberto (2013). La larga crisis argentina [The long Argentine crisis]. Argentina: Siglo Veintiuno Editores. ISBN 978-987-629-304-4.
