= Orlando Barone =

Argentine journalist, writer and university lecturer

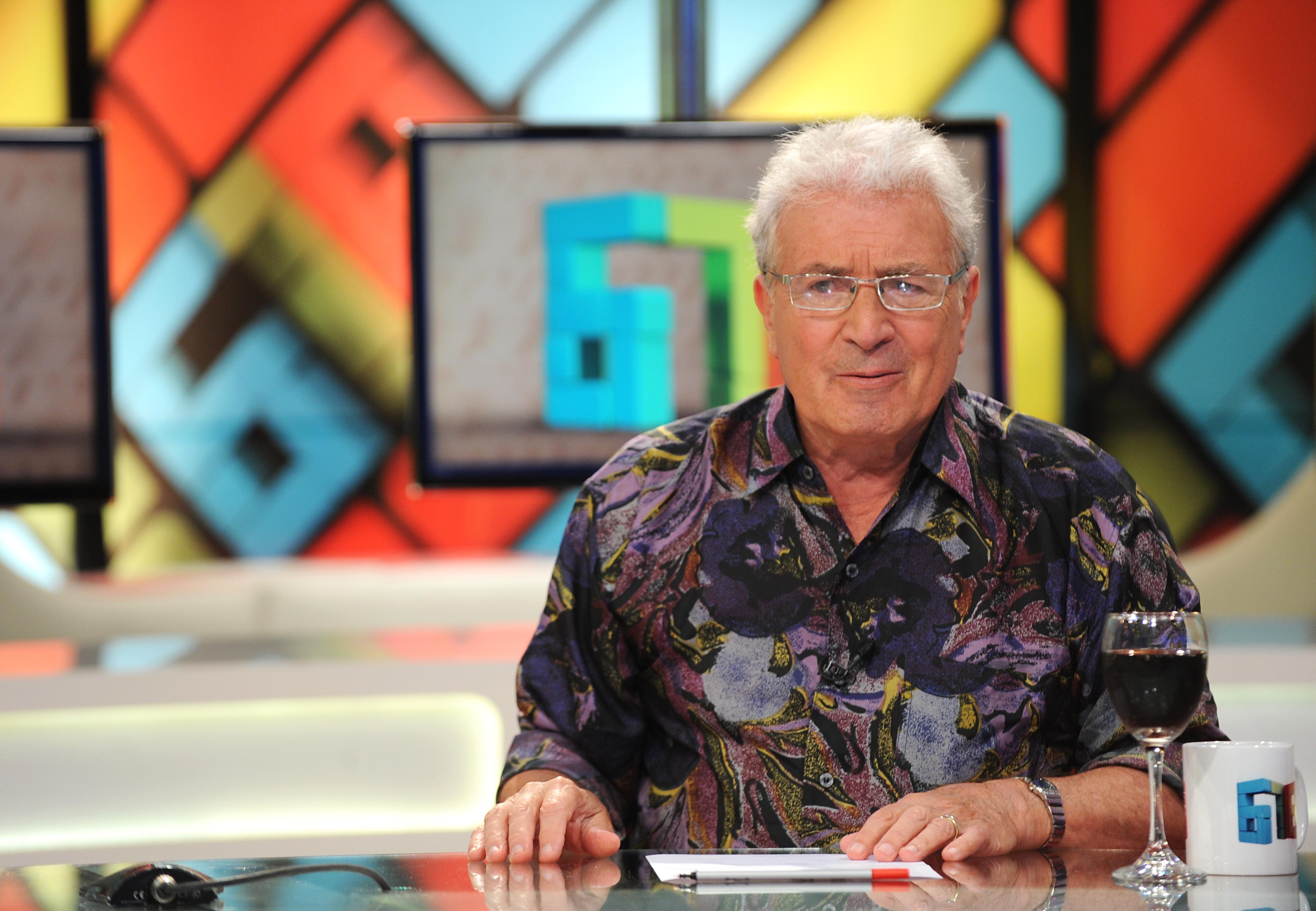
- Orlando Barone (2015)
- Born: 5 October 1941 (age 84); Buenos Aires, Argentina
- Occupations: journalist, writer
- Years active: 1969–present
- Website: Orlando Barone

Orlando Barone (Buenos Aires, 5 October 1941), is an Argentine journalist, writer and university lecturer. As a journalist he works for the newspaper Debate and as a columnist in the TV program 6, 7, 8.

== Biography ==
Orlando Barone started as editor of the magazine Mercado in 1969, where he worked until 1972. That year he released the book Stories Below the Navel.

In late 1974 and early 1975, Barone arranged several meetings between Jorge Luis Borges and Ernesto Sabato, where these writers shared their different perspectives on various matters. These conversations were published in 1997, in the book Dialogues Borges-Sabato. The first edition quickly sold out as did the following two editions. In 2007 it was re-edited. In 1976 he wrote another book of stories entitled Secret Places.

From 1976 to 1981, Barone worked for the newspaper Clarin.

Between 1982 and 1984 he wrote for the magazine Seven Days and for the agency DYN. In that time he was also columnist of the newspaper La Razón led by Jacobo Timerman. In 1987 he was appointed magazine Expreso editor secretary. Three years later he assumed as director of the newspaper Extra. In 1991 he published his first novel, The Fire Locomotive.

In the 1990s he worked for the newspaper Ambito Financiero, the Telam agency and the journal Revista Noticias. In 1999 he published a poems book called The Mouth of the Riachuelo.

During many years he was partner of Victor Hugo Morales in his program in Radio Continental, until he left that place on 2009, 18 February to go to Radio Del Plata. In 2009 he joined the aforementioned TV program 6, 7, 8. The program reflects in a critic way the treatment of the information by the mass media and the performance of the various political sectors in the country.

Barone is also currently teaching in the University of Belgrano and previously in the Catholic University of Argentina and in the Graduate School of Journalism of La Plata. He is also director of the High Institute of Radiophonic Education.
