= 6, 7, 8 =

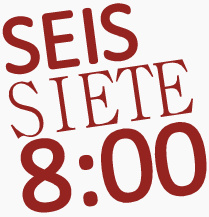
- First logo
- Also known as: The Critique to Real Power
- Genre: Archive television program
- Presented by: Orlando Barone; Carlos Barragán; Jorge Dorio; Cynthia García; Eduardo Massa Alcántara; Mariana Moyano; Dante Palma; Sandra Russo; Nora Veiras
- Country of origin: Argentina
- Original language: Spanish
- No. of seasons: 7

Production
- Executive producer: Diego Gvirtz
- Producer: Pensado Para Televisión

Original release
- Network: Televisión Pública Argentina
- Release: March 9, 2009 – 23 December 2015

Six in the Seven at Eight, usually called 6, 7, 8, is an Argentine political commentary TV program that was broadcast by the government-run Channel 7 from 2009 to 2015. Its name comes from the fact that, when it first started airing, there were five members on the show's panel, and its motto was you are the sixth one (the viewer). Since it was broadcast by Channel 7 at 8 pm, the name was shortened to "6, 7, 8". In late 2009, the program was moved to 9 pm, a new segment was added to be aired on Sundays at night, and new guest panelists were invited, making it more than six members. Nevertheless, the show's name remained unchanged.

The program was first hosted by María Julia Oliván and a panel which included Orlando Barone, Carla Czudnowsky, Eduardo Cabito Massa Alcántara, Luciano Galende, and Sandra Russo, along with a guest analyst who would give their opinions throughout the program. María Julia Oliván announced in an interview for the website Television.com.ar that, on January 28, 2010, she would make her last appearance on the program. Her place was occupied by Luciano Galende, and from 2013 onward the host was Carlos Barragán.

The program was nominated to the 2010 Martín Fierro Awards in the category Best Journalistic Program.

The program's panel discussed national and world events, analyzing their social and political repercussions on Argentina. The program has come under criticism due to its perceived advocacy of Kirchnerism, which is controversial as it was aired by a state-owned TV channel during the time Cristina Kirchner was president. The program ceased to be aired shortly after the end of Kirchner's presidency.

== Airing history ==
6, 7, 8 was first aired on March 9, 2009. The initial name was "6 in the 7 at 8", making reference to the 6 people in the program, the channel Televisión Pública Argentina that airs in channel 7, and that the program was broadcast at 8:00 pm. Although the number of people and the timeslot changed over time, the name "678" was kept. It is an Archive television program focused on politics and journalism. It was created during the campaign for the 2009 midterm elections, in order to broadcast the Kirchnerite propaganda known as Relato K, and to attack the opposing candidates. It received a privileged timeslot on Sundays, right after the broadcasting of the Fútbol para todos weekly matches. Once the elections were over, it continued to voice the Kirchnerite view in the conflict between Kirchnerism and the media.

Mauricio Macri, president of Argentina since December 10, 2015, appointed Hernán Lombardi as the new manager for Channel 7. Soon thereafter it was announced that the channel would not air 6, 7, 8 because the production company decided not to renew the contract with the TV Pública.

== Criticism and controversy ==
According to Clarín newspaper the program uses archive footage to criticize Mass Media outlets, judges and political opponents to the national government.

On October 13, 2009 the program aired a video that had circulated in blogs. The anonymous video was recorded through a hidden camera, and it shows the journalist and columnist of newspaper La Nación, Carlos Pagni, in an alleged operation to publish false information for the purpose of damaging the oil company Repsol YPF. The broadcast of the video was criticized by the Partido Solidario deputy Carlos Heller who was a guest on the program that day, expressing his objection to the publication of anonymous films. The contents of the video were criticized by the panelists after it was shown. According to an article in La Nación that was published the next day about the segment, "the presentation of the hidden camera, and the images of the hidden camera (cut, but carefully and professionally edited) do not, at any moment, show the columnist in situations that could corroborate the serious and injurious charges about corruption that are made in the video through printed boards and a voice-over".

In the video, there are appearances by other people who may represent Pagni, receiving money in return for newspaper articles. However, after the airing on October 13, Pagni received the support of the Argentine Journalism Forum (Foro del Periodismo Argentino) and other journalists.

YPF issued a complaint to investigate who recorded the video, and the veracity of the facts that are seen on it. They assured that "it is true that the video is anonymous and made in a more obscure way. However, it warns that it was a journalistic operation against us".

== Awards ==
=== Nominations ===
- 2013 Martín Fierro Awards
  - Best journalism program

== Bibliography ==
- Oliván, María Julia (2010). 678: La creación de otra realidad. Argentina: Paidos. ISBN 978-950-12-0700-2.
