= Horacio González =

Argentine teacher and essayist (1944–2021)

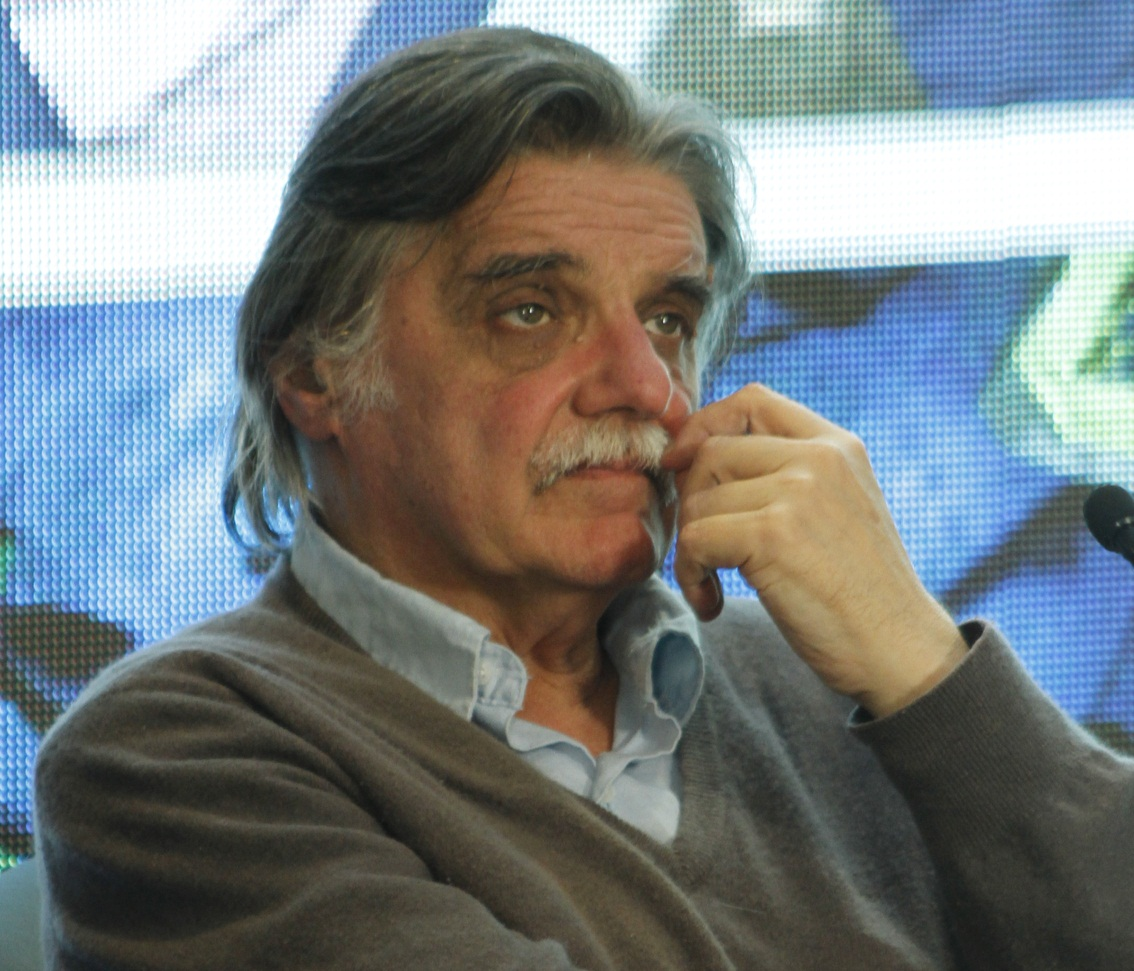
- Born: 1 February 1944; Buenos Aires, Argentina
- Died: 22 June 2021 (aged 77); Buenos Aires, Argentina

Horacio González (1 February 1944 – 22 June 2021) was an Argentine teacher and essayist. Until December 2015, he was the director of the National Library of the Argentine Republic.

== Life ==
Horacio has Italian descent through his maternal grandfather, born in Recanati, Marche. He graduated in sociology at the University of Buenos Aires in 1970. He got the doctorate of social sciences at the Brazilian University of São Paulo in 1992. He was a university teacher since 1968, with academic tenure at the University of Buenos Aires, the National University of Rosario and the Facultad Libre de Rosario. He was part of the Carta Abierta group, and he was the director of the National Library of the Argentine Republic, for the period from 2005 to 2015.

== Death ==
González tested positive for COVID-19 on 19 May 2021, and was admitted to the Sanatorium Güemes in Buenos Aires on that day. He died of the disease on 22 June 2021.

== Works ==
- La ética picaresca, 1992.
- La realidad satírica. Doce hipótesis sobre Página/12, 1992.
- Decorados, 1993.
- El filósofo cesante, 1995
- Arlt: política y locura, 1996
- La Nación Subrepticia: Lo Monstruoso Y Lo Maldito En La Cultura Argentina, 1998.
- Restos pampeanos. Ciencia, ensayo y politica en la cultura Argentina del siglo XX, 1999.
- Cóncavo y convexo, 1999.
- Historia crítica de la sociología Argentina. Los raros, los clásicos, los científicos, los discrepantes, 2000.
- La crisálida. Metamorfosis y dialéctica, 2001.
- Retórica y locura. Para una teoría de la cultura Argentina, 2003
- Filosofía de la conspiración. Marxistas, peronistas y carbonarios, 2004
- La memoria en el atril, 2005
- Los asaltantes del cielo. Política y emancipación, 2006
- Escritos en carbonilla. figuraciones, destinos, relatos, 2006
- Perón: reflejos de una vida, 2007
- Paul Groussac: La lengua emigrada, 2007.
- Las hojas de la memoria. Un siglo y medio de periodismo obrero y social, 2007.
- Beligerancia de los idiomas. Un siglo y medio de discusión sobre la lengua latinoamericana, 2008
- El arte de viajar en taxi. Aguafuertes pasajeras, 2009.
