= David Kavlin =

Argentine radio personality, actor, singer and television host (born 1971)

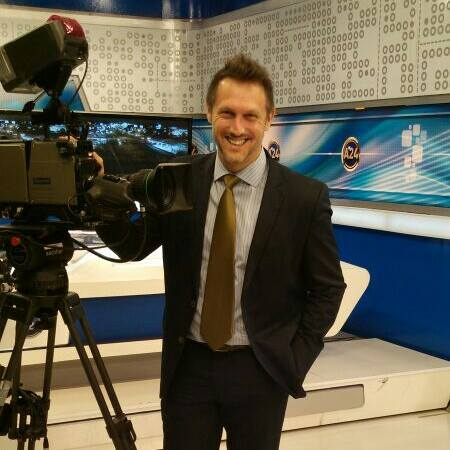
- David Kavlin at the A24 studios
- Born: David Jaime Kavlin; December 26, 1971 (age 54); Salta, Argentina
- Occupations: Television show host, television and radio personality
- Years active: 1980–present
- Spouse: Laura (2012–present)
- Children: Emma (2011), Tommy (2014)
- Website: Official Site

David Jaime Kavlin (born December 26, 1971, in Salta, Argentina) is an Argentine radio personality, actor, singer and television host.

== Life and career ==
=== 1971 – 2000: Early life ===
David Kavlin was born on December 26, 1971, in the province of Salta, Argentina. His father is Bolivian and his grandparents were Jews from Germany, Ukraine and from Belgium.

He got his bachelor's degree in social communication at the National University of Córdoba. In 1985 he got his first job in a pirate radio. Thanks to that he managed to be the radio and television host of Maratón. At this stage of his career he became a local celebrity in his native province, Salta.

Years later he moved to Cordoba, where he worked for the two most important TV channels of the city. There he met his TV partner "El Mono" Amuchastegui. His TV Programme 12 mil, received a nominations for the Martín Fierro Awards in 1993.

In 1996 he travelled to Paraguay, where he co-hosted Canal 13's Verano Heat with "El Mono" and the radio show Radio SO'O in Asunción. In 1997 he hosted Verano Heat and El gusto es nuestro on Canal 13. From 97–99 he was the radio host of Gracias por molestar.

In 1999 he started working for Telefuturo channel. He hosted a TV show titled Anochecer de un día agitado. In 2000 he was the host of Verano agitado-Puerto verano. That same year he hosted the radio show Molestia aparte.

=== 2001–2010: Mainstream success ===
In 2001, he started hosting the successful TV show Vale la pena. In 2003 he hosted the Argentine version of Fear Factor titled Factor Miedo.

In 2005 he hosted the new version of the classic Game Show Feliz Domingo. The show was canceled in 2006.

In early 2007 co-hosted the TV show Fox Sports Playa with Alejandra Martínez, which was broadcast by Fox Sports (Latinoamérica). That same year he also co-hosted Canal 13's Aunque ud. no lo viera with TV partner "El Mono" Amuchastegui. In June he co-hosted the morning TV show D9A12 with Susana Roccasalvo. The show was suddenly canceled in 2007.

In 2008 he came back as the TV host of Improvisados ¿Dónde está el guion?, which he co-hosted with his friend "El Mono" Amuchastegui on Magazine. Thanks to this the TV Show received a nomination for Martín Fierro de Cable 2009.

In 2010 he guest starred on the TV soap opera Alguien que me quiera, broadcast by Canal 13. On the same year he was chosen to act in a Mexican TV Series titled El talismán, which was produced by Pol-Ka.

=== 2011–present: Recent years ===
In 2011 Vale 97.5 played Desperté, his debut single. Also another of his songs was the theme song of the Chilean soap opera Peleles. The song is called Dos amantes and was written by Kavlin himself. He also hosted Canal 26's Lo que pasa en el Día.

In 2012 he hosted Kavlin de Último Momento a late night show, which broadcast by Canal 26.

On December 2, 2013, he started hosting the radio show Informant3s

On June 3, 2014, he started hosting the Late Night show Día 24, on A24 channel. At the moment he is the host of A24's Mediodías, más que noticias.

== Credits ==
=== Television ===
Year	TV Program	Channel	Notes
1993	12 Mil	Canal Doce	Host
1996–1997	Verano Heat	Canal 13	Host
1997	El gusto es nuestro	Canal 13	Host
1999	Anochecer de un día agitado	Telefuturo	Host
2000	Verano agitado-Puerto verano	Telefuturo	Host
2001	Vale la pena	Telefe	Host
2002	Sabor a Mi	Telefe	Host
2002	Vacaciones en Telefé	Telefe	Host
2003	Factor Miedo	Telefe	Host
2005	Showmatch	Canal 9	Guest appearance
2005–2006	Feliz Domingo	Canal 9	Host
2007	Fox Sports Playa	Fox Sports Latinoamérica	Host
2007	Aunque ud. no lo viera	Canal 13	Host
2007	D9A12	Magazine	Host
2008–2009	Improvisados ¿Dónde está el guión?	Magazine	Host
2008	Premios ATVC 2008	Magazine	Host
2010	Alguien que me quiera	Canal 13	Guest Star
2011–2013	Lo que pasa en el Día	Canal 26	Host
2012	Kavlin de Último Momento	Canal 26	Host
2014	Día 24	A24	Host
2014	Mediodías, más que noticias	A24	Host

=== Radio ===
Year	Radio Show	Stations	Notes
1985	Maratón	FM Salta	Host
1996	Radio SO'O	Rock & Pop de Asunción	Host
(1997–1999)	Gracias por molestar	Radio Venus	Host
2008–2009	Circo parlante	Radio Rivadavia	Host
2011	Kavlines pelados	Radio TKM	Host
2013	Informant3s	Radio 89.90	Host
2015	Cafe Fuerte	Radio Uno FM 103.1 (Bs. As.)	Host

== Discography ==
Studio Albums

- 2012: Belleza reversible

== See also ==
- Fear Factor
- List of Argentines
