= Infama =

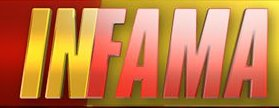
- Logo
- Created by: América TV
- Presented by: Santiago del Moro (2008-2014); Alejandra Maglietti (2008); Rodrigo Lussich (2015-2016); Pía Shaw (2016-present); Denise Dumas (2016-present)
- Starring: Alejandra Canosa (2008); Silvina Fuentes (2008); Sebastián Tempone (2008-2009); Alejandra Maglietti (2009); Magalí Montoro (2009); Valeria Schapira (2009); Adriana Schettini (2009-2010); Paula Varela (2009-2010); Soledad Villareal (2009-2011); Marina Calabró (2010-2014); Ivana Palliotti (2010); Marcela Feudale (2011-2015); Mariana Brey (2013); Andrea Taboada (2014); Cora Debarbieri (2015-present); Noelia Marzol (2015); Daniela Katz (2015); Débora Damato (2015); Lili Monsegou (2015); Carla Conte (2015-2016); Luis Ventura (2016-present); David Kavlin (2016-present); Rafael Juli (2016-present); Nicolas Peralta (2016-present)
- Country of origin: Argentina
- No. of seasons: Spanish language: 9

Production
- Running time: 120 minutes
- Production company: América TV

Original release
- Network: América TV
- Release: 18 August 2008 – present

Infama is an Argentine television talk show, hosted by Santiago del Moro, who won the 2013 Tato Award for television host, following his work in the series.

== Staff ==
=== Season 1 (2008) ===
- Hosts:Santiago del Moro and Alejandra Maglietti
- Panelists:Alejandra Canosa, Silvina Fuentes and Sebastián Tempone
- Chroniclers:Silvia Fuentes

=== Season 2 (2009) ===
- Host:Santiago del Moro
- Panelists:Alejandra Maglietti, Magalí Montoro, Valeria Schapira, Adriana Schettini, Paula Varela, Soledad Villareal and Sebastián Tempone
- Chroniclers:Silvina Fuentes, Sebastián Tempone and Pía Shaw

=== Season 3 (2010) ===
- Host:Santiago del Moro
- Panelists:Marina Calabró, Adriana Schettini, Paula Varela, Soledad Villareal and Ivana Palliotti
- Chroniclers:Sebastián Tempone and Pía Shaw

=== Season 4 (2011) ===
- Host:Santiago del Moro
- Panelists:Marcela Feudale, Marina Calabró y Soledad Villareal
- Chroniclers:Sebastián Tempone

=== Season 5 (2012) ===
- Host:Santiago del Moro
- Panelists:Marcela Feudale and Marina Calabró
- Chroniclers:Sebastián Tempone

=== Season 6 (2013) ===
- Host:Santiago del Moro
- Panelists:Marcela Feudale, Marina Calabró and Mariana Brey
- Chroniclers:Sebastián Tempone

=== Season 7 (2014) ===
- Host:Santiago del Moro
- Panelists:Marcela Feudale, Marina Calabró and Andrea Taboada
- Chroniclers:Sebastián Tempone

=== Season 8 (2015) ===
- Host:Rodrigo Lussich
- Panelists:Marcela Feudale, Cora Debarbieri, Noelia Marzol, Daniela Katz, Débora Damato, Lili Monsegou and Carla Conte.
- Chroniclers:Sebastián Tempone and Alejandro Guatti

=== Season 9 (2016) ===
- Hosts:Rodrigo Lussich (Abandonment), Pía Shaw and Denise Dumas
- Panelists:Luis Ventura, Cora Debarbieri, Carla Conte (Abandonment), David Kavlin, Rafael Juli y Nicolas Peralta
- Chroniclers:Sebastián Tempone and Alejandro Guatti
- Executive producers : Fernanda Merdeni - Julio Chao

=== Season 10 (2017) ===
- Hosts:Pía Shaw and Denise Dumas
- Panelists:Luis Ventura, Cora Debarbieri, David Kavlin, Sofía Macaggi, Guido Záffora y Guillermo Pardini.
- Chroniclers:Sebastián Tempone, Alejandro Guatti and Nicolas Peralta
- Executive producers : Fernanda Merdeni - Julio Chao

== Awards ==
=== Nominations ===
- 2013 Martín Fierro Awards
  - Best male television host (Santiago del Moro)
