= Blessed by Fire =

2005 Argentine film

- Spanish: Iluminados por el fuego
- Directed by: Tristán Bauer
- Written by: Tristán Bauer; Edgardo Esteban; Miguel Bonasso; Gustavo Romero Borri
- Based on: Iluminados por el fuego by Edgardo Esteban with collaboration of Gustavo Romero Borri
- Produced by: Ana de Skalon; Carlos Ruta
- Starring: Gastón Pauls; Pablo Ribba; César Albarracín; Hugo Carrizo
- Cinematography: Javier Juliá
- Edited by: Alejandro Brodersohn
- Music by: León Gieco
- Distributed by: Distribution Company
- Release date: 8 September 2005
- Running time: 100 minutes
- Countries: Argentina; Spain
- Language: Spanish

Blessed by Fire (Spanish: Iluminados por el fuego) is a 2005 Argentine-Spanish war drama film co-written and directed by Tristán Bauer. The film features Gastón Pauls, Pablo Ribba and Juan Leyrado. The story centers on the Falklands War and it is based on the book of the same title written by Edgardo Esteban, a veteran of the conflict.

== Plot summary ==
The story centers on two young men who are sent to fight the 1982 war in the Falkland Islands and who return home bearing the brutal scars of war. Twenty years after the war's end, journalist Esteban Leguizamón is informed that Alberto Vargas, one of the men he served with, has attempted suicide after suffering from years of depression brought on by his experiences in the war. Esteban visits the comatose Vargas at the hospital, and in a series of extended flashbacks, revisits the scene of Argentina's "unwinnable war."

The film depicts Esteban and fellow soldiers Vargas and Juan, who are living in foxholes on the remote, windswept Falklands, battling hunger, boredom, abuse, and the deprivations of war as they await the arrival of British forces. A series of harrowing battle scenes with British forces ensues, and the Argentines realise the futility and violence of their mission. They are cannon fodder, pawns in a futile political game.

Back in the present, Esteban returns to the Falklands to come to terms with himself and the past. The emotional final scenes were shot on location in the Falklands, for the first time in Argentine film. As Esteban looks over the still off-limits battlefields filled with mines, live ammunition, and rusting military equipment, the futility of war is abundantly clear.

== Cast ==
- Gastón Pauls as Esteban Leguizamón
- Pablo Ribba as Alberto Vargas
- César Albarracín as Juan Chamorro
- Victor Hugo Carrizo as Pizarro
- Virginia Innocenti as Maria Vargas
- Juan Leyrado
- Arturo Bonín

== Release ==
The film was shown on the Australian TV channel SBS on March 17, 2009.

== Awards ==
Silver Condor: Graciela Fraguglia, Alejandro Brodersohn, Tristán Bauer, Edgardo Esteban, Miguel Bonasso, Gustavo Romero Borri, Virginia Innocenti.
