= Archive television program =

An archive television program is a television program that makes a heavy use of archived broadcasting of other television programs. The format is a success in Argentina, with several programs at most of the TV channels.

== In Argentina ==
The genre was first introduced in the country in 1994 by Perdona nuestros pecados, a comedy by Raúl Portal. The program highlighted the mistakes and faulty productions seen in other programs. The genre was later picked up by talk shows, that air a portion of an event that took place at some other program, which is then discussed by the people in the studios. Other programs do not employ debate, and work instead as news programs of the events that took place in the television itself.

Political programs such as Intratables use a similar format to the talk shows, but focused on politics-related events. Others like 6, 7, 8 and Televisión Registrada highlight contradictions between modern events and things that the involved politicians may have said in the past; this use was criticized because it usually forced seemed contradictions by using phrases from out of context for shocking value.

== Other countries ==
The genre has little use outside of Argentina. Spain has the TV programs I love TV and Zapping de surferos. The Chilean laws would not allow this genre, as the content generated by other TV channels can only be re-aired with authorization. Mexico, with a high number of telenovelas and fiction programs, airs programs with summaries of the most important events of the week at their respective episodes. There are no programs in the US television, as they would likely be rejected by the US audiences.
