= Jackal of Pupunahue =

20th-century Chilean mass murderer

- Chacal de Pupunahue
- Roldán during his commutement from capital punishment to life in prison, June 1958
- Born: José Misael Roldán Concha; 30 June 1934; Máfil, Valdivia Province, Chile
- Died: After 1958; Isla Teja, Valdivia, Chile
- Height: 1.70 m (5 ft 7 in)
- Status: Died in prison
- Motive: Unknown, possibly alcoholism
- Penalty: Death penalty (nullified by presidential clemency); Life imprisonment

Details
- Date: 1954 – 7 June 1957
- Killed: 7
- Injured: 1

José Misael Roldán Concha (30 June 1934 – ?), better known as The Jackal of Pupunahue (Spanish: El Chacal de Pupunahue), was a Chilean coal miner known for the brutal murder of a woman and five of her seven children while on probation for an earlier murder. Although he was originally sentenced to death, then-president Carlos Ibáñez del Campo granted him presidential clemency, essentially reducing his sentence to life in prison.

== Biography ==
Roldán Concha came from a poor family, being the 10th out of 14 siblings. He dropped out from school at 13 years of age and began working in agriculture and coal mining. Roldán was described as an untalkative and robust man, as he weighed 80 kilograms and was 1.70 meters tall.

== Murders ==
Map of Chile with locations related to the crimes of The Jackal of Pupunahue.

In 1954, during his work in coal mining, he got into a fight with a foreman after being fired for arguing with a higher-up over his paycheck. The foreman hit Roldán with a lamp, to which Roldán responded by hitting him in the head with a wooden stick, killing the man. He subsequently attempted to escape to Argentina, but eventually surrendered to the police after his sister convinced him to do so and was sentenced to five years of prison to be served at a Victoria prison. Because of good behavior, Roldán was given probation after his first year in prison. Hours before the murder, Roldán had been at the police station of Antilhue to sign, as this was a condition of the probation.

In the night of June 7, 1957 Roldán, who was in a state of heavy inebriation, had dinner with his elderly parents and some of his brothers at the Los Copihues coal mine camp. He then went to buy fruit at the shop of Laura Díaz Díaz, a neighbour of his family and wife of his colleague Custodio Gómez Chacón, grabbing an iron bar on the way. According to his later declarations, Roldán had gone to Díaz's shop to buy fruit because he was thirsty after drinking. Laura's husband was by then working at a night shift in the coal mine at the time. Once Laura got back with the oranges José Misael had ordered he began an unprovoked and indiscriminate attack with the bar, killing Laura along with five of the seven children (aged 1 to 14), along with gravely injuring 11-year old Nora, daughter of Laura, who, after being hit and having all of her teeth knocked out, hid under a bed.

The murders occurred in the locality of Pupunahue in the commune of Máfil, southern Chile. Reportedly, the murders were followed by acts of necrophilia with Díaz' corpse and attempted arson to erase evidence by setting fire to a mattress before escaping into a nearby forest.

== Aftermath ==
The murder became known when Nora Gómez Díaz, whom Roldán believed to be dead, woke up following the attack, put out the fire that Roldán started, and reported the actions to local police, who caught him after an all-night hunt. Roldán confessed to the murders, but refused to give a motive or confess to the necrophilic acts. Later on, he admitted that alcoholism played a part, along with detailing how he felt an urge to abuse Díaz's corpse after he saw that she was not wearing underwear at the time of her death.

Upon hearing about this, the local community was outraged and demanded the death penalty, which he was later condemned to by the second court of Valdivia (Spanish: Segundo Juzgado de Valdivia) and upheld by the Supreme Court of Chile. However, then-President Carlos Ibáñez del Campo eventually got involved in the case, granting clemency to Roldán, whose sentence was then reduced to life imprisonment.

José Misael Roldán spent the rest of his life in prison without any parole benefits, where he eventually died. The house in which the 1957 murders occurred was later demolished and replaced with a bust honoring the six victims.

== See also ==
- The Jackal of Nahueltoro
- Death of Julia Chuñil, near Pupunahue
