= Macarena Valdés =

Mapuche human rights activist (1983–2016)

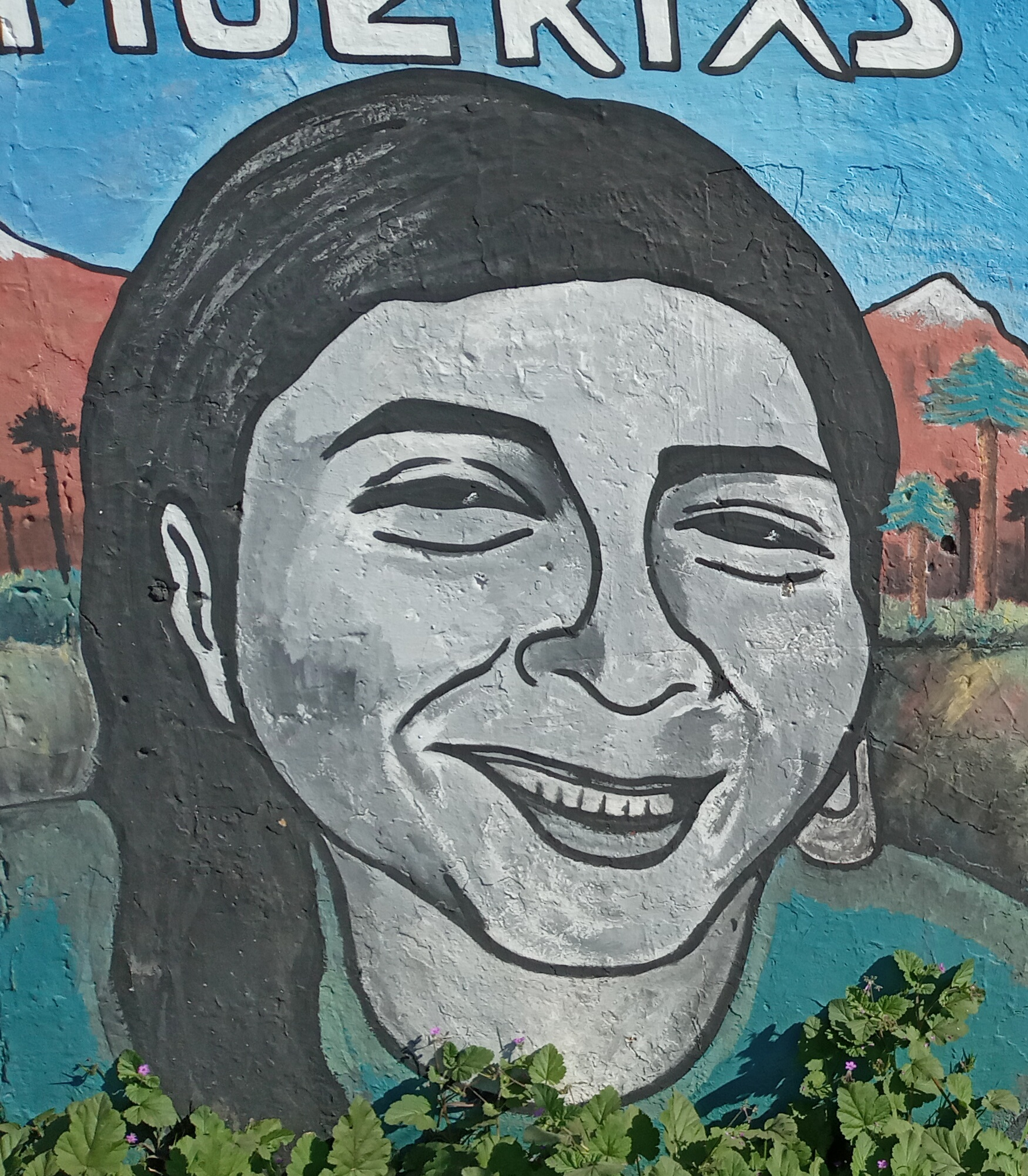
- Mural of Valdés in Santiago, Chile
- Born: Yudy Macarena Valdés Muñoz; December 23, 1983; Hualañé, Curicó Province, Maule Region, Chile
- Died: August 22, 2016 (aged 32); Panguipulli, Valdivia Province, Los Ríos Region, Chile
- Cause of death: Strangulation
- Occupation: Mapuche human rights activist

Yudy Macarena Valdés Muñoz (23 December 1983–22 August 2016) was a Mapuche human rights activist who led a campaign against the construction of a hydroelectric plant on the Tranguil River. Following her death, she has been compared to other murdered South American female activists including Berta Cáceres and Marielle Franco.

== Biography ==
Valdés was born in Hualañé, Maule Region, but spent most of her life in Santiago. In 2014, after wishing to live according to Mapuche culture and principles, Valdés, alongside her partner, Rubén Collío, and their children moved to Tranguil, Los Ríos Region, where they joined the Mapuche community of Newen. Collío was subsequently elected as the community's werkén, increasing Valdés' visibility and profile in the local community.

A hydroelectric plant was under construction on the Tranguil River by the Austrian company RP Global and the Chilean company SAESA, which had resulted in the felling of native forests and the flooding of two eltuwe (ancestral cemeteries). Collío led the Mapuche campaign to halt the plant's construction, with him and Valdés leading a series of demonstrations, including one on 1 August 2016 which saw Valdés and other members of the community block route CH 201, a national highway leading to a border crossing with Argentina. The demonstrations resulted in the Provincial Government of Valdivia initiating a dialogue between RP Global, SAESA, and local communities about the plans for the plant.

== Death and investigation ==
Valdés was last seen alive at around 13:00 on 22 August 2016 by Collío. She was due to attend a routine medical appointment with her infant son in the town of Liquiñe and had planned to catch a bus at 14:30. Valdés' 11-year-old son returned home and found Valdés hanging from a rope tied to a beam, with her youngest son still present.

Collío filed a criminal complaint following Valdés' death. The investigation was led by public prosecutor Alejandra Anabalón from the Panguipulli Local Prosecutor's Office. The first autopsy, performed by the Legal Medical Service of Valdivia, classified Valdés' cause of death as "asphysxiation by hanging" and noted that her body showed no injuries attributable to third parties. The prosecutor's office interviewed Valdés' relatives about her psychological state and concluded that she had suffered from depression and so closed the investigation with the verdict that she had likely died by suicide.

Valdés' family and the Newen community in Tranguil questioned the verdict of suicide in light of previous death threats Valdés had received for taking part in demonstrations against the construction of the hydroelectric plant. In 2018, a forensic doctor hired by Valdés' family completed an analysis of Valdés' autopsy report and questioned the results, concluding that she was likely already dead at the point at which she was hanged due to her neck not showing any injuries ordinarily caused from hanging whilst alive; a second autopsy was recommended. On 21 August 2017, the prosecutor's office officially reopened the investigation, and a second autopsy was completed, concluding that "the existence of objective signs that support that the victim had been alive at the time of being suspended by a rope or noose... is not confirmed". A histopathological study of tissue from Valdés' neck by scientists at the University of Chile established the absence of vital lesions, meaning that she was likely dead at the point of being hung from the beam. At the end of 2018, the official investigation into Valdés' death was reclassified from "suicide" to "discovery of a corpse".

Following the second autopsy, pathologist John Clark issued a report, published on 12 August 2019, highlighting the lack of detailed description of how she was found deceased in the official investigation report, in addition to "deficient" initial forensic examinations of Valdés' body. Clark concluded that Valdés had died from ligature strangulation and that her body may have been suspended later to simulate suicide.

== Response ==
Following Valdés' death, activist groups denounced that she had been murdered in a form of corporate femicide due to her being a Mapuche woman defending indigenous land from being plundered from companies. The social media campaigns #FueHomicidio and #ALaNegraLaMatron" demanded justice for Valdés and were used as slogans at demonstrations held in Chile demanding justice for Valdés.

== See also ==
- Julia Chuñir Catricura, a Mapuche activist who disappeared in 2024 in Los Ríos Region.
