= Canal 26 (Argentina) =

Argentine news cable channel

Canal 26 Channel 26
- Country: Argentina
- Broadcast area: Argentina; International
- Headquarters: Brigadier Juan Manuel de Rosas 2860, San Justo, Buenos Aires

Programming
- Language: Spanish
- Picture format: 1080i HDTV (downscaled to 576i/480i for the SD feed)

Ownership
- Owner: Telecentro

History
- Launched: April 1, 1996
- Former names: 26 TV (1996–1998)

Links
- Website: www.canal26.com

Canal 26's former logo

Canal 26 was an Argentine news pay television channel and website operated by Grupo Telecentro. It broadcasts from La Matanza Partido, although its studios are located in Capital Federal, Capital City from Argentina. Founded in the mid‑1990s as a variety channel, it soon evolved in a 24-hour news channel, although it also shows some music and special interest shows.

Canal 26 can be normally tuned on channel 7, although Telecentro, cable operator from the same company, chooses to offer it on channel 11, DirecTV on 720 and Flow on channel 18.
