= Julia Chuñir Catricura =

Mapuche activist (born 1952)

Julia Chuñir Catricura (born c. 1952) is a Mapuche human rights activist. She was the president of the Putreguel Mapuche community in Máfil, Los Ríos Region, and was known for her work on indigenous land rights in Chile. Chuñir Catricura was last seen on 8 November 2024, and has not been seen since.

== Activism ==
Chuñir Catricura was the leader and president of the Mapuche Putreguel Community. She was known for her defence of Mapuche territory from attempts to appropriate it for private use. Chuñir Catricura's community's land was purchased by the National Corporation for Indigenous Development, meaning it could not be used by anyone not of indigenous descent. She became particularly known for her defence of 900 hectares of indigenous land against a local businessman, Juan Carlos Mostadt Anwandter, who was of German descent, and who had been previously the beneficiary of land acquisition processes during the Pinochet regime, refusing his offers to purchase her land. Chuñir Catricura had received threats from landowners due to her defence of Mapuche land claims.

In 2015, CONADI ruled that some of the land owned by Mostadt Anwandter, was indigenous; however, he and CONADI were unable to come up with an agreement for them to purchase his land, with Mostadt Anwandter continuing to clear forest land for firewood. In August 2024, it was alleged that Mosadt Anwandter had tried to run over Chuñir Catricura in his car.

== Disappearance ==
On 8 November 2024, Chuñir Catricura disappeared from Huichaco on the border between the communes of Máfil and Los Lagos. She was last seen by a friend leaving her home to go on a walk on the nearby Lafrir estate, where she kept farm animals. It was subsequently reported in local media outlets that Chuñir Catricura had left her home armed with a machete to search for lost livestock.

On 10 November 2024, Chuñir Catricura was reported missing by her son-in-law; the Investigation Police of Los Rios Province subsequently launched a missing person investigation, supported by fire brigade teams and Chuñir Catricura's family and friends. Footprints and tyre tracks were identified at a wooden cabin which reportedly belonged to Chuñir Catricura.

Chuñir Catricura's family stated that days prior to her disappearance, she had been threatened by unknown individuals who told her to leave her land. Her daughter expressed concern that Chuñir Catricura was fit and healthy and familiar with the land she disappeared on and so did not believe that she had gotten lost or experienced an accident. It was reported in the local press that Mostadt Anwandter had previously made threats against, Chuñir Catricura stating he had already purchased all the land around hers.

On 10 December 2025, the President of Chile, Gabriel Boric, acknowledged Chuñir Catricura's disappearance, reaffirming authorities' commitment to locating her.

In January 2025, the Instituto Nacional de Derechos Humanos called for further investigations into Chuñir Catricura's disappearance, including the application of the Escazú Agreement that had been ratified by Chile in 2022. That same month, the Regional Representative of the United Nations Human Rights Office in South America, Jan Jarab, met with Chuñir Catricura's son as well as local human rights groups.

On 14 July 2025, the Inter-American Commission on Human Rights issued precautionary measures in favour of Chuñir Catricura due to concerns about the lack of progress into the investigation into her disappearance, which required Chilean authorities to "redouble" its efforts to locate Chuñir Catricura and to provide updates to her family.

== Response ==
Front Line Defenders expressed concern that Chuñir Catricura's disappearance was linked to her "legitimate and peaceful work in defence of human rights", calling on Chilean authorities to take "all necessary measures" to determine Chuñir Catricura's whereabouts and to confirm her safety. Cultural Survival called for an increase in the search efforts for Chuñir Catricura and to make public the investigation completed by local authorities. Amnesty International called for authorities to increase their search efforts and make publish investigative results.
