= Juan Forn =

Argentine writer and translator (1959–2021)

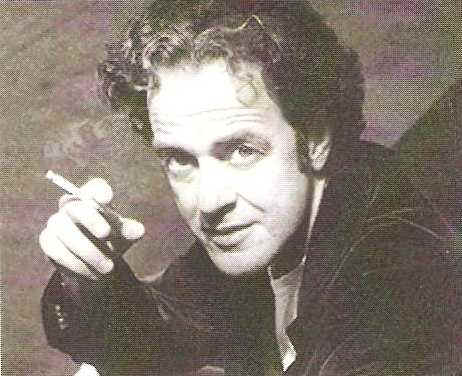
Juan Forn

Juan Forn (November 5, 1959 – June 20, 2021) was an Argentine writer, translator, and editor. He wrote four novels (Corazones cautivos más arriba, 1987, Frivolidad, 1995, Puras mentiras, and María Domecq, 2007), a compilation of short stories (Nadar de noche, 1989) and essays (La tierra elegida, 2005, and "Ningún hombre es una isla", 2010).
