= Tristán Bauer =

Argentine film maker

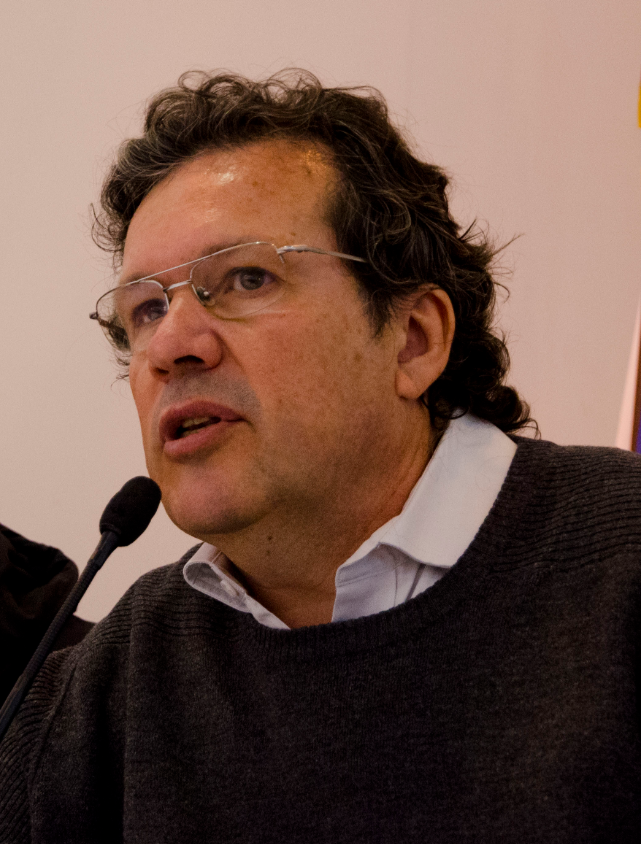

Minister of Culture
- In office 10 December 2019 – 10 December 2023
- President: Alberto Fernández
- Preceded by: Pablo Avelluto (as Secretary of Culture)
- Succeeded by: Office abolished

Personal details
- Born: 22 June 1959 (age 67) Mar del Plata, Buenos Aires Province, Argentina
- Party: Independent
- Occupation: Film producer Television producer

Tristán Bauer (Spanish pronunciation: [tɾisˈtan ˈbaweɾ]; born 22 June 1959) is an Argentine film maker, screenwriter and politician. From 2019 to 2023, he served as Argentina's Minister of Culture in the cabinet of President Alberto Fernández.

He breakout film was the 1991 drama Después de la tormenta ("After the Storm"), which received the New Directors Award at the 1990 San Sebastián Festival and eight Silver Condor awards, including best picture and best director. He also received the best director and best picture Silver Condor Awards for his documentary Cortázar (1994), and best artistic direction and best screenplay adaptation for Iluminados por el fuego (2005); the latter of which also received the Goya Award for best foreign film in the Spanish language.

From 2008 to 2013, Bauer served as director of the National Media System of Argentina. He was responsible for the foundation of Canal Encuentro, a TV network dependent on Argentina's Ministry of Education, and is a member of the board of directors of the Venezuelan government's propaganda network Telesur.

== Filmography ==
- Fueye - 1982, short film
- Martín choque, un telar en San Isidro - 1982, short film
- Ni tan blancos, ni tan indios - 1984, short film
- After the Storm (Después de la tormenta) - 1990
- El oficio de amar - 1993
- Celestial Clockwork (Cortázar) - 1994
- Evita: The Unquiet Grave (Evita, una tumba sin paz) - 1997
- The Books and the Night (Los libros y la noche) - 1999
- Blessed by Fire (Iluminados por el fuego) - 2005
- Che: A New Man (Che, un hombre nuevo) - 2010
- El Camino de Santiago - 2018
- Tierra Arrasada - 2019

== See also ==
- Cinema of Argentina
