= Santiago del Moro =

Argentine game show host (born 1978)

- Born: February 9, 1978 (age 47); Tres Algarrobos, Buenos Aires, Argentina
- Occupation: TV presenter
- Years active: 1998–present

Santiago Pascual del Moro (born 9 February 1978) is an Argentine TV host. He has won the 2013 Tato award as best male TV host for his work in Infama. He is also an actor, known for 22, el loco (2001), El refugio (de los sueños) (2006) and Apariencias (2000).

== Filmography ==
- Gran Hermano (season 11) (host - 2022)
- MasterChef Celebrity (seasons 1, 2, 3 & The Rematch) (host - from 2020)
- ¿Quién quiere ser millonario? (host - 2019)
- Escuela para suegras (host - 2017)
- Intratables (host - 2013–2018)
- Soñando por bailar (host - 2011–2012)
- Infama (host - 2008–2014)
- Lalola (As Matías - 2007–2008)
- Rock in TV (host - 2006–2007)
- Bendita (panelist - 2006–2007)
- Casados con hijos (As Agent Pettuto - 2006)
- El Refugio (As Marco Lenguizamón - 2006)
- Una Familia Especial (As Nicolás - 2005)
- 22, el loco (As Juan - 2001)
- El Aguante (host - 1998–1999)

== Awards ==
- 2015 Martín Fierro Awards
  - Best male host (for Intratables)

=== Nominations ===
- 2013 Martín Fierro Awards
  - Best male TV host (for Infama)
