= Ricardo Forster =

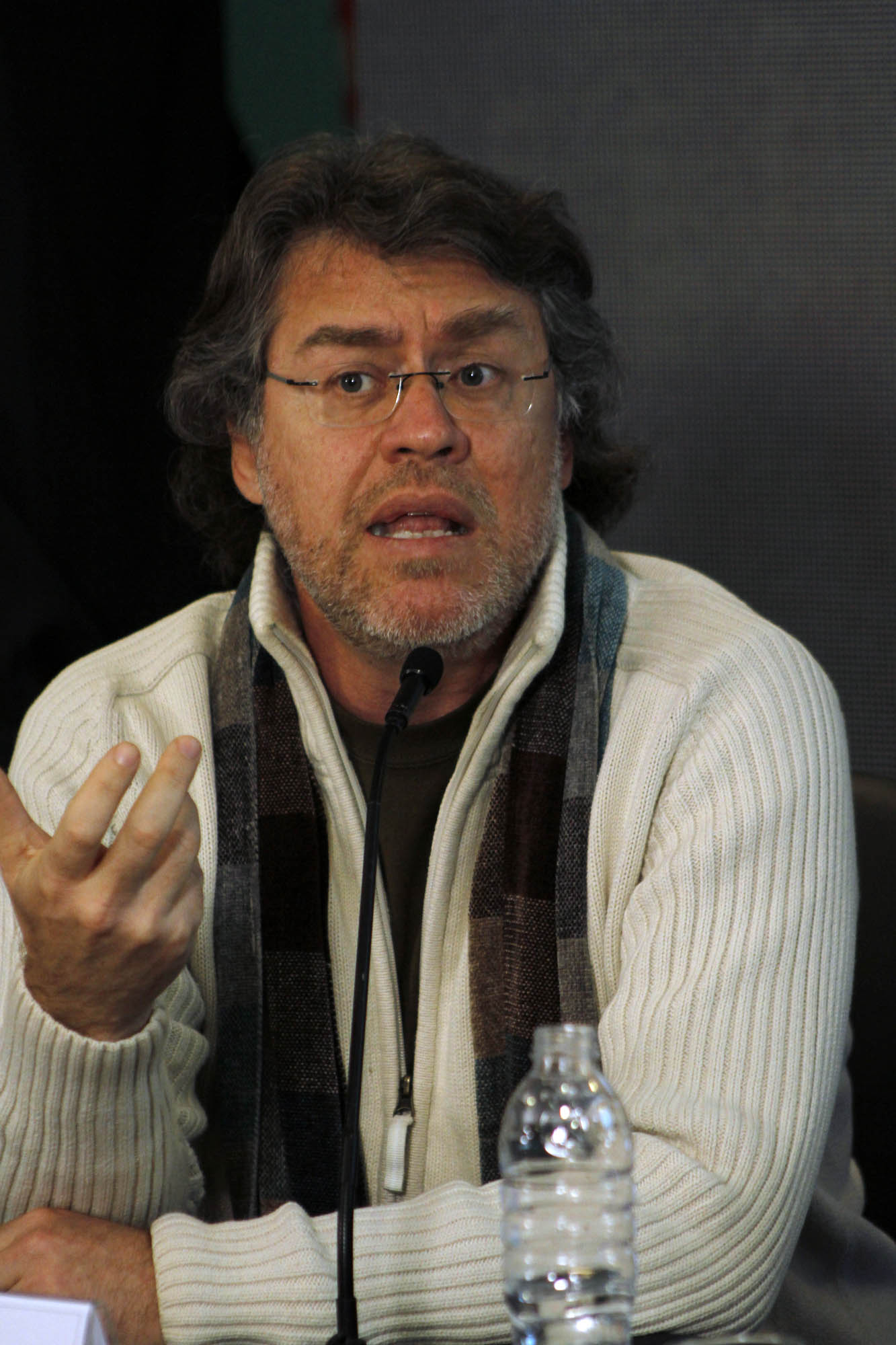
- Forster in 2011
- Born: 26 September 1957 (age 68); Buenos Aires, Argentina

Philosophical work
- Era: 21st-century philosophy
- Region: Western Philosophy
- Main interests: political science history of ideas philosophy of history

Ricardo Forster (born 26 September 1957) is an Argentine philosopher, historian of ideas and political critic.

He is professor and researcher at Universidad de Buenos Aires and University of Maryland. He is also member of the editorial board of Pensamiento de los Confines magazine. Along with Horacio Verbitsky, Nicolás Casullo and others created Espacio Carta Abierta ("Open Letter Spot"), a propagandistic group in defense of the Kirchner government, in 2008, after an attempt to raise taxes on agricultural exports led to large street protests.

He also had a small incursion in television as presenter of "Grandes pensadores del siglo XX" ("Greatest thinkers of 20th-century") in Encuentro, in years 2009–2010.

In 2013, he ran for a seat in the Chamber of Deputies. He was fourth on the Front for Victory list, which came in third place with less than 22% of the vote, not enough for Forster to be elected.

In June 2014, the position of "Secretary of Strategic Coordination of National Thought" was created by the Kirchner administration and Forster was named its first office holder. The Secretary was given the task to "design, coordinate and instrument a factory of National Thought" and its creation and Forster's naming were criticised by the opposition but applauded by Carta Abierta.

Forster is also an essayist and writer. In his works he develops his thinking on diverse subjects, which include political philosophy, nihilism, the entire concept of essay (topic of his doctoral dissertation), and social sciences in general.

== Selected bibliography ==
- W. Benjamin – Th. W. Adorno, el ensayo como filosofía. Buenos Aires: Nueva Visión, 1991. ISBN 950-602-230-5
- Itinerarios de la Modernidad (junto a Nicolás Casullo y Alejandro Kaufman). Buenos Aires: Eudeba, 1996. ISBN 950-29-0312-9
- El exilio de la palabra. Ensayos en torno a lo judío. Buenos Aires: Lom, 1997. ISBN 956-282-050-5
- Walter Benjamin y el problema del mal. Buenos Aires: Altamira, 2003. ISBN 987-9423-77-1
- Crítica y sospecha. Los claroscuros de la cultura moderna. Buenos Aires: Paidós, 2003. ISBN 950-12-6531-5
- Mesianismo, nihilismo y redención (junto a Diego Tatián). Buenos Aires: Altamira, 2005. ISBN 987-9017-42-0
- Notas sobre la barbarie y la esperanza. Del 11 de septiembre a la crisis argentina. Buenos Aires: Biblos, 2006. ISBN 950-786-553-5
- El laberinto de las voces argentinas. Ensayos políticos. Buenos Aires: Colihue, 2008. ISBN 978-950-563-972-4
- Los hermeneutas de la noche. De Walter Benjamin a Paul Celan. Buenos Aires: Trotta, 2009. ISBN 978-84-9879-024-5
- Benjamin. Una introducción. Buenos Aires: Quadrata/Biblioteca Nacional, 2009. ISBN 978-987-631-004-8
- La anomalía Argentina. Buenos Aires: Sudamericana, 2010. ISBN 978-950-07-3272-7
- La muerte del héroe. Buenos Aires: Ariel, 2011. ISBN 978-987-14-9611-2
- El litigio por la democracia. Buenos Aires: Planeta, 2011. ISBN 978-950-49-2717-4
