= Alejandro Castro (activist) =

Chilean activist (1988–2018)

- Born: Alejandro Alberto Castro Castro; September 20, 1988; San Bernardo, Chile
- Died: October 4, 2018 (aged 30); Valparaíso, Chile
- Cause of death: Suicide (disputed)
- Other name: 'El Mecha'

Alejandro Alberto Castro Castro (20 September 1988 – 4 October 2018) was a Chilean environmental activist. His death, officially reported as a suicide, has been the subject of numerous conspiracy theories.

== Biography ==
Alejandro Castro was born and raised in San Bernardo by his mother, Alejandra Castro Romo, and his grandmother, Beatriz Romo. In his youth, he studied at the Ñuñoa N°7 School and Santa María School in Las Condes. He got involved in politics at a young age, organizing his first school rally in 2006. He met his first partner, Maryam "Mandy" Jara, in 2007. On the first of April of that year, he was integrated into the military service in Punta Arenas. Castro and his partner had their only son, Benjamín León Castro Jara, on July 7, 2009.

In 2014, he became a fisherman and moved to Quintero, distancing him from his son and partner. There, he became deeply involved in political activism and had another partner, Polet Urrutia, with whom he had his only daughter, Giuliana Castro Urrutia, who was born in 2016 and died a few months later. During his period as an activist, he organized various public protests for the environmental cause.

== Death ==
Several months before his death, he had allegedly suffered from an "undiagnosed condition" that was never treated medically, which caused him to suffer from depression and alcoholism. According to several witnesses, he had previously tried to commit suicide twice.

During the morning of October 3, 2018, Castro, along with several Quintero leaders, went to a national protest called by the teachers' union. When he returned, he drank "several liters" of beer and got into a fight with his partner, who boarded a bus to Concón. Now alone, Castro walked towards a subway line. He arrived just before 00:30 in the morning, the time where he supposedly hanged himself. He had a backpack on at the time of his death.

=== Investigation ===
Although the Chilean Carabineros and the Investigations Police of Chile dismissed the idea that he was murdered, Castro's family insisted that they had received death threats in the previous days, which led to an investigation by the director general of the PDI, Héctor Espinosa. There were no external marks present on his body. A friend of Castro, Carolina Orellana, said that an unidentified policeman had screamed to him during a protest "Alejandro Castro, we have you identified!" and that "They wanted to put him in jail for no reason".

He suffered direct threats from officials of the Valparaíso Seventh Commissioner which came all the way to Quintero. All that happened after the second protest, which took place on September 23. We are doubtful for the same reasons. Those close to him hope to know what were the real causes of his death from official sources.

— Carolina Orellana,

=== Legacy ===
His funeral was organized on October 7 in the Municipal Cemetery of Quintero. During the commemoration, his mother commented:

I don't know if a [separate] person killed him. I don't know what really happened.

— Alejandra Castro,

After his death, his figure became a symbol of the environmental struggle in Chile. Over the next following days, various protests were organized in his honor. His death has also been the subject of numerous conspiracy theories, which suggest that the state of Chile killed him or was involved in his death. He has also been compared to Macarena Valdés, another environmental activist who died under mysterious circumstances.
