= Death of Santiago Maldonado =

Death of Argentine activist

Santiago Maldonado
- Born: Santiago Andrés Maldonado; 25 July 1989; Buenos Aires, Argentina
- Died: 1 August 2017 (aged 28); Chubut Province, Argentina
- Cause of death: Drowning
- Occupation: Activist

Santiago Maldonado was an Argentine activist who went missing after the Argentine National Gendarmerie dispersed a demonstration against the Benetton Group's activities in Cushamen Department, Chubut Province, Argentina, on 1 August 2017. Maldonado's body was found in October in the nearby Chubut River. The autopsy of the body indicated that Santiago's cause of death was "drowning by immersion in the water of the Chubut River, contributed by hypothermia", that there were no signs of violence, and that the body had stayed underwater for at least 55 days. In November, a commission of 55 forensic experts asserted that Maldonado died by asphyxia and hypothermia, and that there were no evidence of blows or injuries to his body. Maldonado's family continue to believe he was a victim of a forced disappearance.

== The event ==
Santiago Andrés Maldonado (born 25 July 1989) was a craftsman and tattoo artist from the town of Veinticinco de Mayo, province of Buenos Aires. A few months before his disappearance he had moved to El Bolsón, province of Río Negro, about 70 kilometers north of a Mapuche settlement named Cushamen. Maldonado supported the aboriginal communities in their land claims, but, according to his family, he was not an "activist" or "militant". His brother and a friend have described him as an anarchist.

The event took place on July 31 and August 1, 2017, at the Chubut Province. The location was the Pu Lof de la Resistencia of Cushamen, a mapuche establishment built in territories seized from the Italian clothing company Benetton Group by Facundo Jones Huala. Huala, member of the Resistencia Ancestral Mapuche group, was jailed because of the violent protest activities including destruction of properties that undertook in several locations, and members of the Pu Lof organized a picketing protest at the National Route 40, advocating for his liberation. The people in the demonstration were hooded, and had completely blocked the road with trees, stones and fire, thus not allowing any transit through the road. The protest was carried out by eight people, Santiago Maldonado among them. Judge Guido Otranto instructed the Argentine National Gendarmerie to clear the blockade and disperse the protesters, who escaped. The judge had also instructed them to use minimal violence, and film the operation on video.

The protesters tried to block the road again some hours later, on August 1. The protesters reacted violently to the Gendarmerie this time, and attacked them with stones. Commander Juan Pablo Escola reported that two gendarmes were gravely injured in their faces during the attack. He sent a group of 30 gendarmes to the Pu Lof. Although he did not have a judicial warrant to do so, he considered that the attack could be considered as in flagrante delicto, which would have allowed to skip that requirement.

Some protesters attempted to escape by swimming across the Chubut River, and others tried to hide in a forest next to the river. Maldonado didn't know how to swim. The whereabouts of Santiago Maldonado were unknown after that point.

== Judicial case ==
A judicial case, led by a judge and three prosecutors, tries to determine the whereabouts of Maldonado. The national government and the provincial government of Chubut asked to be complainants in the case. The Inter-American Commission on Human Rights suggested that, in case of doubt about a case being a forced disappearance or not, it should be investigated as if it was. In line with this suggestion, the Gendarmerie was removed from taking an active role in the investigation. The United Nations Committee on Enforced Disappearances has requested to oversee the investigation, which was accepted by Argentina. As a result, both the judiciary and the Argentine government will have to keep the organization updated about every progress of the investigation.

The case was initially investigated as a search and rescue, and was later rebranded as a forced disappearance. However, the change was made without any new evidence that may suggest an involvement of the Gendarmeria.

A group of twenty mapuches occupied the court on September 20, asking for the removal of judge Otranto.

The Maldonado family and the Center for Legal and Social Studies (CELS) accused the judge Otranto of not being an impartial jury. The federal chamber of appeals of Comodoro Rivadavia recused him from the case, but clarified in the sentence that they found no reason to doubt his intellectual honesty and respect to the procedures. He was recused instead because of an interview with the newspaper La Nación, where he made an extrajudicial commentary about the accuracy of the theories, before formally closing the case. Otranto was then replaced by judge Gustavo Llerald. The Maldonado family celebrated the removal of Otranto, but complained that their specific request had been rejected. Otranto is still in charge of the case over the road block that started the case.

On 21 October 2017, after a 12-hour autopsy involving 52 experts, including those appointed by Maldonado's family, Judge Gustavo Lleral confirmed that Maldonado's body did not have any signs of violence and the cause of death was established as death by drowning. On November 24, 2017, the verdict of the 55 experts confirmed that Maldonado drowned and that there were no signs of violence on his body. How, when and why he died is still on investigation.

The prosecutor Silvina Avila asked in December 2017 to change the folder of the case from forced disappearance to suspicious death, on the grounds that the investigation did not reveal any clue that may support the forced disappearance hypothesis. There was a similar request from the Ministry of Security in May 2018. The judge Lleral rejected both requests. He pointed that the folder of the case is inconsequential, that changing it before the case was closed would be an improper advance of opinion, and that the case is not guided by the folder's name but by the results of the investigations. There are no specific members of the gendarmerie formally accused of wrongdoing or called for inquiry, which turns it into a moot point.

== International cases ==
On August 7, 2017, the UN Committee on Enforced Disappearances expressed its "concern about the physical and psychological integrity" of Maldonado and requested the Argentine state to adopt "a comprehensive search strategy", taking "all the urgent measures that are necessary to search for him and find him, taking into account the information provided by the members of the Pu Lof Mapuche community that were present at the moment of the repression". The UN committee also requested that the Gendarmerie does not participate in the search and investigation of the disappearance and that the Argentine government protects all the evidence that may help to identify those responsible for the disappearance. The same day, the Minister of Security offered a reward to those who "while not having participated in the crime, offer useful information that can help find the whereabouts" of Maldonado.

On August 23, the Inter-American Commission on Human Rights (IACHR), of the Organization of American States, also took a precautionary measure asking the Argentine state to "adopt all the necessary measures to determine the situation and whereabouts of Mr. Santiago Maldonado" and to "inform about all the measures that have been adopted to investigate the facts".

On October 6, the UN Committee on Enforced Disappearances published a document addressed to the Argentine national government in which the former expresses its concern about the lack of progress in the clarification of what happened to Santiago Maldonado. The UN demanded the Macri administration to set as a priority the clarification of the role of the Gendarmerie and to keep this force away from the investigation. It also accused the authorities of quickly rejecting the hypothesis according to which the Gendarmerie is the perpetrator of the enforced disappearance of Maldonado. The Committee expressed its concern regarding the lack of partiality of judge Guido Otranto. It finally pointed out that there are officials of the Macri administration that continue to stigmatize the members of the Pu Lof by portraying them as a threat to national security, when the government should be instead offering protection to the Mapuche community.

The UN and the IACHR closed those cases in January 2018, two months after Maldonado's body was found. They found no evidence of foul play in the investigation.

== Drowned ==
Eventually a corpse was found in the Chubut river on October 17. There were no reports of other deaths or missing people in the area, and it was confirmed that it was a male, with light blue clothes as those that witnesses reported that Maldonado was wearing. The corpse was found 300 meters upstream from the area of the events.

The presence of many aquatic plants and strong flow had made it extremely difficult to find the corpse sooner. The autopsy conducted on 21 October 2017 confirmed forensic evidence clearly pointed to drowning and hypothermia as the cause of death The autopsy, witnessed by 52 experts including that of the Maldonado family and international organizations, revealed no evidence of injuries. The corpse was acknowledged to be Maldonado's by the 52 experts witnessing the autopsy. On November 29, 2018, Judge Lleral closed the case citing no further evidence pointing towards anything different to an accidental drowning.

The accepted theory is that as Maldonado fled from the Gendarmerie he tried to hide in some bushes on the shore of the Chubut river hoping evade the security forces; no security officer or personnel came near him or even saw where he was hiding. Either Maldonado was waiting for the Gendarmerie to leave the area when the ground below him collapsed into the body of water or he presumably jumped into the river trying to rejoin with the others on the other side. The strong currents and Maldonado own heavy winter clothing sent him to the bottom of the river. As Maldonado did not know how to swim he panicked and failed to come up the surface. As the hypothermia set in, because of the cold water, he went into shock and drowned leaving his body submerge.

== Maldonado's family reaction ==
Despite the recovery of the body, the results of the autopsy and the lack of any evidence of foul play the Maldonado family insisted that the case was one of forced disappearance. They proposed that Santiago had been forcefully abducted and killed by the gendarmerie elsewhere and later his body dumped in the river. They claimed that the body had signs of cryopreservation, although the autopsy never provide any signs of this or even that the body had been manipulated in any way after death. This theory also could not provide an explanation as to how the body could have been dump without being immediately detected by local mapuches who were living on the adjacent areas.

The Maldonado family requested at least two more autopsies on the body. The judge rejected both requests. The judge claimed results of first one were clear and there was no point in performing further autopsies on the body. They also asked for several other investigations, that the judge systematically rejected them as extemporaneous, pointless and impossible to perform.

== Discarded hypothesis ==
=== Forced disappearance ===
False accounts of security forces detaining protestors were made. According to alleged witnesses, after the Lof protesters clashed with the Argentine National Gendarmerie, government agents were seen carrying somebody to a truck. Later those witnesses admitted to lying to the court and were charged with perjury. The Gendarmerie denies having ever detained Maldonado.

The witnesses made public comments, but refused to testify in court. They proposed to testify while concealing their identities and with hoods over their faces, which was rejected by the judiciary. Other witnesses told before justice that Maldonado was taken by Gendarmerie agents.

Eighty biological samples were retrieved from the vehicles used by the Gendarmerie during the operation, and used for a DNA test. The results were released a month later: none of them matched the DNA of Maldonado. The value of this evidence was disputed by a public defender, Fernando Machado, who argued that the samples could have been taken after the trucks had been washed, he never provided any evidence of this. The judge dismissed those concerns.

The prosecutor Silvina Avila made a report that established that there are no solid evidence that linked the Gendarmerie with Maldonado. As of September 17, the judge does stooped considering the theory of a forced disappearance as likely.

Audio files from a WhatsApp conversations were submitted into evidence. One of the files, sent by a member of the gendarmeria, stated that a sergeant had "Maldonado in a truck" but further analysis revealed that the comment was made on August 16, several weeks after the protests, and was only a joke between members of the Gendarmerie Under court order over 70 cell phones from Gendarmerie officers were analyse during the investigation. None of them had been used to discuss any actual forced disappearance operation or provided any proof of wrongdoing.

Ariel Garzi, a fellow craftsman and friend from El Bolsón, claimed he called Santiago Maldonado's cellphone on August 2 and that call was answered by an unknown person. It lasted 22 seconds, during which Garzi heard the sound of steps. An engineer from the National Technological University, claimed he could triangulate the location where the phone was answered but needed a court order. The phone was later found in a house Santiago used to live in prior his death, presumably left behind by Santiago before going to the protest.

=== Received a mortal wound ===
Commentators stipulated that Santiago might have received a mortal wound as he fled from the protest, which would have later caused his death. This was later proven false by the autopsy report.

=== Hiding ===
A theory considered that Maldonado was still alive, hiding in Mapuche territory. A search with search and rescue dogs conducted on August 16 suggested that he would have been in the area in the previous 24 hours.

Some government official also considered the possibility that Maldonado may not have been in the protest to begin with. As all people in the protest were hooded, it was impossible to properly identify him in any photos or video of the event. The Maldonado family reported that he was a quiet and peaceful man, which would make it unlikely that he would take part in a violent protest in a road. The mapuches Beatriz Garay Neri, Soraya Noemí Guitart and Nicolás Jones Huala reported that they talked with him on August 1, in the morning, but did not provide further details about his presence at the protest, the topics the discussed together and admitted they did not know his full name.

=== Murder ===
Santiago Maldonado used his cell phone for the last time on July 21, 2017. That day, four or five hooded members of the Resistencia Ancestral Mapuche forcefully invaded the small home of Evaristo Jones, a mapuche who worked for the Benetton family as a caretaker. Jones reported that he tried to defend himself by stabbing one of those people with a knife. As there were no cases of knife injuries treated in nearby hospitals on that day, or information about Maldonado's activities and whereabouts in the immediate days prior to the August 1 protest, it was proposed that he may have been the wounded assailant and that he had bled to death days before the protest.

The family of Maldonado tried to refute this theory by providing a video of another picketing protest of the RAM that took place on July 31, which would have been attended by Maldonado. They also provide testimonials from numerous people who saw Santiago after the supposed attack. In addition, Evaristo Jones, the attacked worker, denied knowing how badly he had injured his attackers. The Maldonado family also claimed that they had telephone conversations with Santiago on July 25, his birthday, and on July 27.

DNA tests later ruled out that Santiago Maldonado was the assistant injured in the Evaristo Jones attack.

== Reactions ==
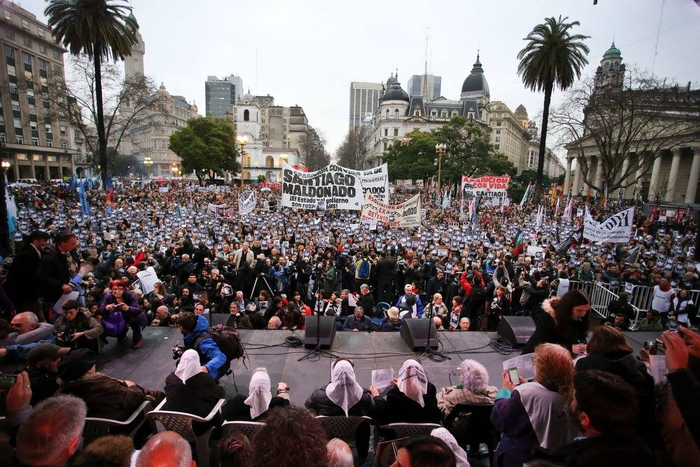
A demonstration in Buenos Aires

According to Argentinian sociologist Marcos Novaro, Kirchnerism and human rights organizations exploited the case to advance a political discourse against Macri. Treating the case like a forced disappearance allowed to draw comparisons between his government and the Dirty War that took place during the National Reorganization Process, in the 1970s. According to this narrative, Macri would have a covert plan to kidnap and kill demonstrators, the gendarmerie, the judiciary and the media would be working alongside Macri in such a plan, and Maldonado would be just the first victim of it. Human rights organizations had aligned themselves with the Kirchners during the government of both Néstor and Cristina Fernández de Kirchner, even in topics unrelated to human rights, and often worked as their spokesmen. They kept this role since 2015, when Macri defeated Cristina Kirchner in the presidential elections. This, however, undermined their legitimacy in the Argentine society, as an increasingly portion of the population loses interest in the events of the 1970s, and their public image got tied to that of Cristina Kirchner.

The disappearance of Maldonado had also mobilized international human rights organizations, such as Amnesty International and Human Rights Watch. In Buenos Aires, La Plata, Bariloche, Mar del Plata, Bahía Blanca, General Madariaga, Mendoza, Malargüe, El Bolsón, Rawson, Viedma, Gualeguaychú, Rosario and Neuquen thousands of people marched in demonstrations demanding that Maldonado appears alive and the resignation of Bullrich. People also marched to demand that Santiago Maldonado is brought back alive in Bogotá (Colombia), Asunción (Paraguay), Montevideo (Uruguay), Canelones and Fray Bentos (Uruguay). In Spain, several Argentine residents marched to Plaça de Catalunya to ask for Santiago Maldonado. On August 11, there was a large mass demonstration in Plaza de Mayo, Buenos Aires. On August 21, during the 49th ordinary session of PARLASUR, in Montevideo, Argentine representatives condemned the disappearance of Santiago Maldonado.

The disappearance of Maldonado took place shortly before the 2017 midterm elections. Cristina Fernández de Kirchner, leader of one of the opposition parties, mentioned the case repeatedly during her rallies. The corpse of Maldonado was found a few days before the elections. By the time of voting, the Maldonado family had confirmed his identity and the initial autopsy revealed no signs of violence against the body; the official results of the full autopsy would be released a pair of weeks later.

August 30 is the International Day of the Disappeared, and several teachers affiliated to the CTERA union mentioned the event during school classes. This action was rejected by groups of parents because it described the involvement of the Gendarmerie as a confirmed fact, and it was considered a case of political indoctrination.

The Macri administration first denied the disappearance of Maldonado. As the days went by, members of Mr. Macri's cabinet send contradictory messages.

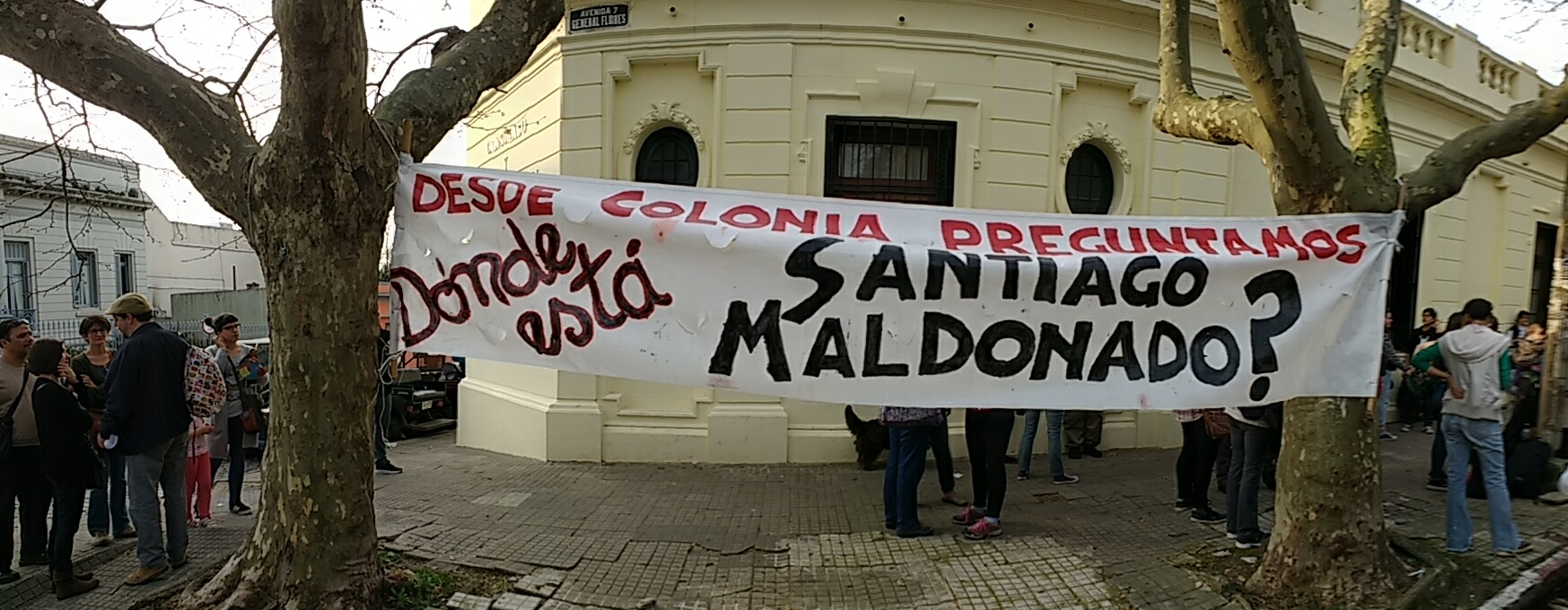
Demonstrators in Uruguay ask for the whereabouts of Santiago Maldonado

On September 1, 2017, a month after Santiago Maldonado's disappearance, thousands of people expressed themselves through rallies and demonstrations asking for his appearance alive. The largest demonstration took place in Plaza de Mayo and was organized by Grandmothers of the Plaza de Mayo, Mothers of the Plaza de Mayo (Línea Fundadora), Relatives of the Disappeared and Imprisoned for Political Reasons, HIJOS, the Center for Legal and Social Studies (CELS), the Argentine League for the Rights of Man, and the Permanent Assembly for Human Rights, among other organizations. In other cities, such as Mendoza, Mar del Plata, San Luis, San Juan, Neuquén, Salta, Posadas, Jujuy, Santiago del Estero, Villaguay, Concepción del Uruguay, Gualeguaychú and Concordia there were rallies and demonstrations with the same demand. In Rosario and Córdoba there were rallies with an attendance of 40000 each. There were also protests in Spain, Brazil, France, Uruguay, Chile, Mexico, Austria and the United States which were organized through social media. In London, São Paulo and Madrid, groups of people expressed their solidarity with the demand for the appearance of Santiago Maldonado alive.

== See also ==
- El camino de Santiago
- Death of Camilo Catrillanca
- Death of Julia Chuñil
- Lists of solved missing person cases
- Anarchism in Argentina

== Bibliography ==
- Novaro, Marcos (2017). El Caso Maldonado (in Spanish). Argentina: Edhasa. ISBN 978-987-628-470-7.
