= La Pelu =

La Pelu is a 2013 Argentine humoristic program aired by Telefe, starring Florencia de la V.

== Awards ==
=== Nominations ===
- 2013 Martín Fierro Awards
  - Best humoristic program
