= María Julia Oliván =

Argentine journalist

María Julia Olivan is an Argentine journalist.

== Awards ==
=== Nominations ===
- 2013 Martín Fierro Awards
  - Best female journalist
