= Sea.Hear.Now Festival =

Annual event in Asbury Park, New Jersey, United States

- Status: Active
- Genre: Music festival
- Frequency: Annually
- Locations: 1300 Ocean Avenue, Asbury Park, New Jersey, United States
- Years active: 2018–present
- Inaugurated: September 29, 2018
- Website: seahearnowfestival.com

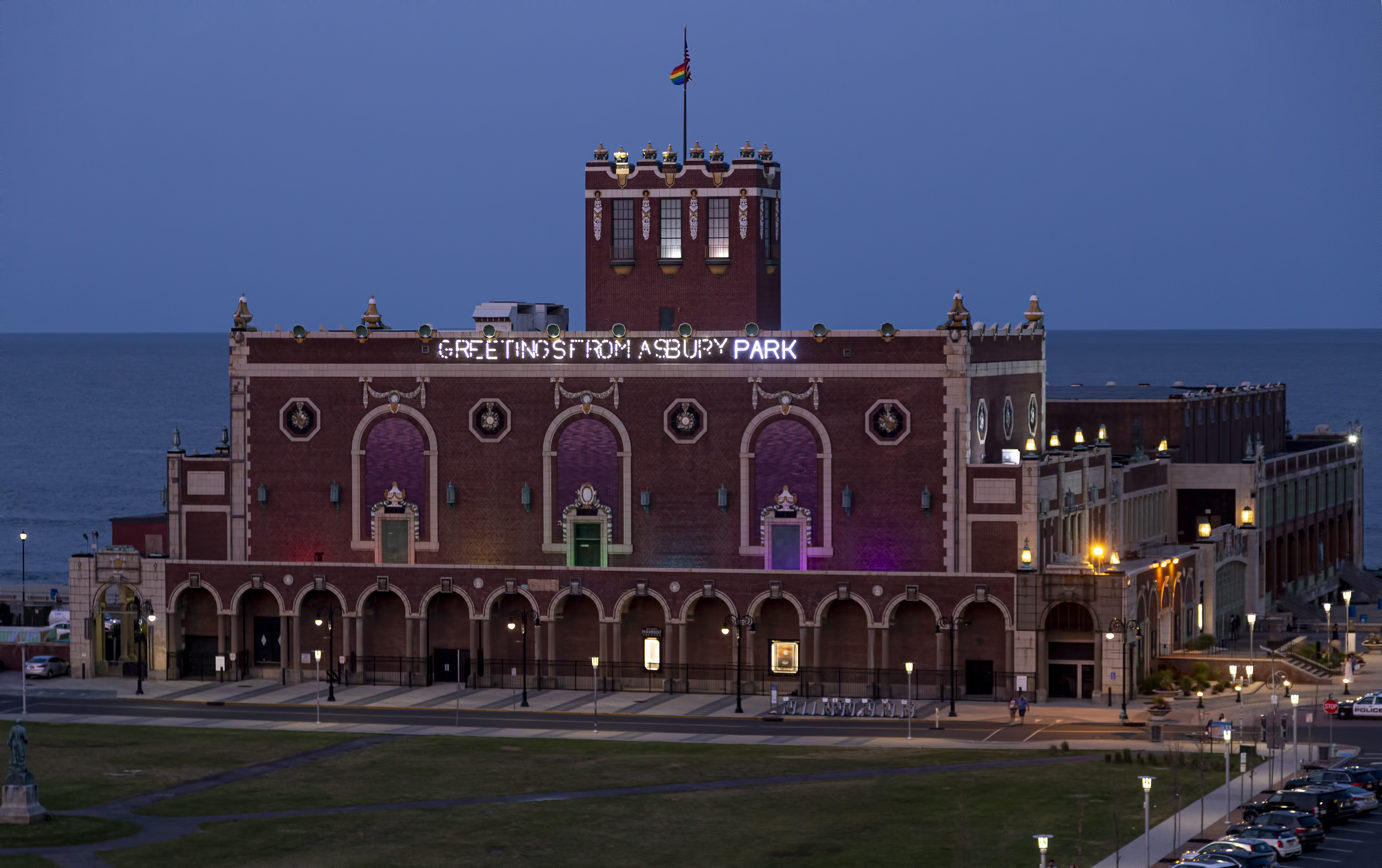
Paramount Theatre at Asbury Park Convention Hall at nightfall with the Atlantic Ocean behind it.

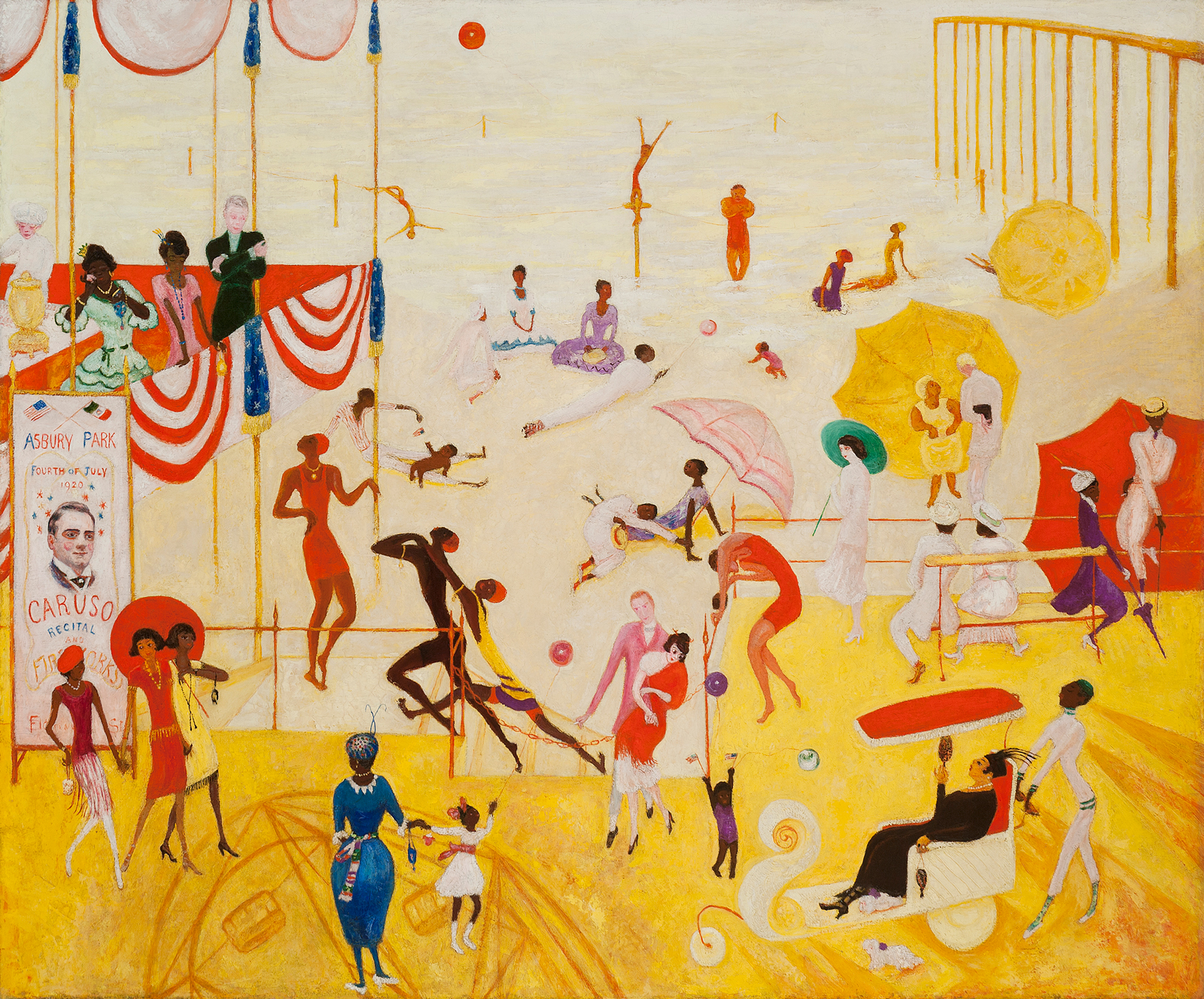
Asbury Park South, a 1920 painting by Jazz Age artist Florine Stettheimer depicts the beach and boardwalk at Asbury Park where the festival is now held.

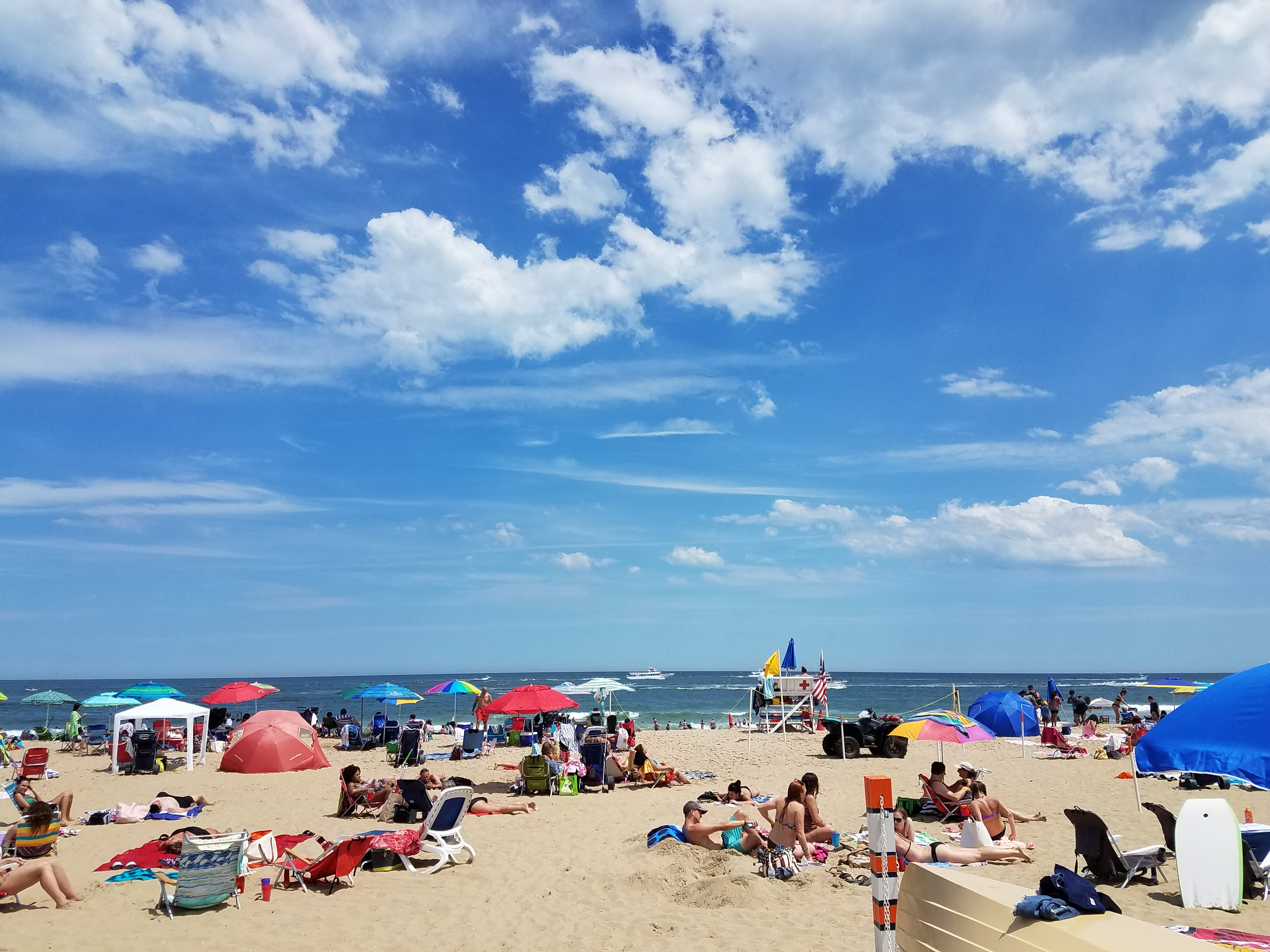
Asbury Park beach

The Sea.Hear.Now Festival (aka Sea Hear Now or SHN) is an annual music, art and ocean sustainability festival featuring a professional surfing competition held in Asbury Park, New Jersey. Held on the beach and boardwalk in September, it is produced by, among others, rock photographer Danny Clinch, Tim Donnelly, HM Wollman, and C3 Presents’ Tim Sweetwood.

Digital pop culture magazine The Pop Break named Sea.Hear.Now the best new music festival of the year in 2018. Billed as a celebration of live music, art, and surf culture, a portion of proceeds go to ocean-focused and environmental charities such as the Surfrider Foundation and Save the Bay.

== Late night shows ==
After the festival's operating hours, SHN is also known for late night local shows at a variety of live music venues in Asbury Park such as The Stone Pony, House of Independents, The Saint, Asbury Lanes, and Wonder Bar.

== 2026 ==
The 2026 Sea.Hear.Now Festival is scheduled to take place on September 19–20, 2026, in Asbury Park, New Jersey. The festival will feature a lineup of rock, pop, alternative, and legacy artists, alongside professional surfing competitions, art installations, and food vendors along the Asbury Park waterfront.

Headliners will include The Strokes, Mumford & Sons, Goo Goo Dolls, The Offspring, and Chaka Khan.

Other performers are set to include The War on Drugs, Pixies, Moby, Fontaines D.C., The All-American Rejects, Shaggy, Men at Work, Ziggy Marley, Susanna Hoffs of The Bangles, 54 Ultra and Kim Gordon of Sonic Youth.

== Previous festivals ==
The festival has held annual shows since 2018, excluding 2020 in light of the pandemic.

=== 2018 ===
- Blondie
- Bruce Springsteen (guest appearance)
- Social Distortion
- Incubus
- Jack Johnson
- Ben Harper
- Kaleo
- Brandi Carlile
- SOJA
- Frank Turner
- The Wailers
- Preservation Hall Jazz Band

=== 2019 ===
- Dave Matthews Band
- The Lumineers
- Dispatch
- Marcus King
- Joan Jett
- Bad Religion
- The B-52’s
- Blind Melon
- Cat Power
- Steel Pulse
- Pigeons Playing Ping Pong
- Rainbow Kitten Surprise

=== 2020 ===
The 2020 festival was postponed to 2021 due to the COVID-19 pandemic.

=== 2021 ===
- Pearl Jam
- Smashing Pumpkins
- Patti Smith
- Billy Idol
- Ani Difranco
- Cory Henry
- Lord Huron
- Matt & Kim
- Orville Peck
- The Avett Brothers
- Tank and the Bangas

=== 2022 ===
The 2022 festival was held on September 17-18, 2022.

==== Saturday ====
- Stevie Nicks
- My Morning Jacket
- Billy Strings
- Gary Clark Jr.
- Boy George & Culture Club
- Fletcher
- The Backseat Lovers
- Peach Pit
- Skip Marley
- Celisse
- Annie DiRusso
- Aly & AJ
- The Surfrajettes
- Dogs In A Pile
- Dentist

==== Sunday ====
- Green Day
- Cage the Elephant
- The Head and the Heart
- Idles
- Wet Leg
- Courtney Barnett
- Michael Franti and Spearhead
- Tai Verdes
- Shakey Graves
- Andy Frasco & The UN
- Cimafunk
- The Little Mermen
- Calder Allen
- Lost in Society
- The Vansaders

==== Surf ====
The 2022 festival featured pro surfers including, among others, Cory Lopez, Sam Hammer, Cassidy McClain and Eric Geiselman. The surfers competed in the "North Beach Rumble", a team surf contest.

==== Late Night Shows ====
The 2022 Festival included four "Late Night Shows" that took place after the festival's normal operating hours. Shows took place at Asbury Park local venues, such as The Stone Pony and The Wonder Bar, featuring The Backseat Lovers, Gods, Yawn, The Ocean Ave Stomp and The Surfajettes.

=== 2023 ===
The 2023 festival was held on September 16-17, 2023.

==== Saturday ====
- The Killers
- Greta Van Fleet
- Nathaniel Rateliff & The Night Sweats
- Sheryl Crow
- Tash Sultana
- Royal Blood
- Bob Moses
- Cory Wong
- Oteil & Friends
- Living Colour
- Babe Rainbow
- Surfer Girl
- SNACKTIME
- Quincy Mumford
- Yawn Mower

==== Sunday ====
- Foo Fighters
- Weezer
- Rebelution
- Mt. Joy
- The Beach Boys
- The Breeders
- Tegan & Sara
- Stephen Sanchez
- Joey Valence & Brae
- Adam Melchor
- Daniel Donato's Cosmic Country
- Easy Star All-Stars
- Sunflower Bean
- Waiting on Mongo
- Alexander Simone & Whodat?

=== 2024 ===
In March 2024, the festival announced its line-up for September 14-15, 2024:

==== Saturday ====
- Noah Kahan
- The Black Crowes
- 311
- The Revivalists
- The Hives
- Grace Potter
- Sierra Ferrell
- Peaches
- Guster
- Ziggy Alberts
- Robert Randolph Band
- Passafire
- Sonic Blume
- Joe P

==== Sunday ====
- Bruce Springsteen & The E Street Band
- The Gaslight Anthem
- Trey Anastasio Band
- Norah Jones
- Kool & the Gang
- Action Bronson
- Gogol Bordello
- Larkin Poe
- Joy Oladokun
- The Aces
- Eggy
- Illiterate Light
- Bertha
- Sunshine Spazz
- Rachel Ana Dobken

==== Surf ====
- Balaram Stack
- Cam Richards
- Sam Hammer
- Cassidy McClain
- Rob Kelly
- Paul Francisco
- Pat Schmidt
- Mike Gleason
- Tommy Ihnken
- Logan Kamen
- Jamie DeWitt
- Cole Deveney
- Audrey Iglay

=== 2025 ===
In March 2025, the festival announced its lineup for September 13-14, 2025:

==== Saturday ====
- Hozier (Headliner)
- LCD Soundsystem
- Alabama Shakes
- ZZ Top
- Remi Wolf
- Royel Otis
- De La Soul
- UB40
- Gigi Perez
- Trombone Shorty
- Orleans Avenue
- Inhaler
- Mondo Cozmo
- Bumpin Uglies
- Phoneboy
- Not Yer Baby

==== Sunday ====
- Blink-182 (headliner)
- Lenny Kravitz
- Sublime
- Public Enemy
- TV on the Radio
- Spoon
- Phantogram
- 4 Non Blondes
- Hot Mulligan
- Mannequin Pussy
- Grace Bowers & The Hodge Podge
- Landon McNamara
- Neal Francis
- Surfing for Daisy
- The Tide Bends

==== Surf ====
- Landon McNamara
- Cam Richards
- Balaram Stack
- Sam Hammer
- Rob Kelly
- Cassidy McClain
- Pat Schmidt
- Mike Gleason
- Tommy Ihnken
- Logan Kamen
- Jamie Dewitt
- Cole Deveney
- Audrey Iglay
- Paul Francisco
- Mia Gallagher

=== 2026 ===
In March 2026, the festival announced its lineup for September 19-20, 2025:

==== Saturday ====
- Mumford & Sons (Headliner)
- The Offspring
- Chaka Khan
- The War on Drugs
- The All American Rejects
- Shaggy
- Men at Work
- Susanna Hoffs
- Fitz and the Tantrums
- Tom Odell
- 54 Ultra
- Anders Osborne
- Steph Strings
- Nat Myers
- Jarod Clemons

==== Sunday ====
- The Strokes (headliner)
- Goo Goo Dolls
- Fontaines D.C.
- Moby
- Pixies
- Ziggy Marley
- Kim Gordon
- Ben Howard
- Hot Mulligan
- Flipturn
- Die Spitz
- Alice Phoebe Lou
- Makua
- King Stingray
- Blaise
- Status Green

==== Surf ====
- Sam Hammer
- Cassidy McClain
- Cam Richards
- Balaram Stack
- Rob Kelly
- Pat Schmidt
- Mike Gleason
- Tommy Ihnken
- Logan Kamen
- Jamie Dewitt
- Cole Deveney
- Audrey Iglay
- Paul Francisco
- Mia Gallagher
- Eden Edwards
- Cruz Dinofa

== See also ==
- North to Shore Festival
- Music of Asbury Park
- New Jersey music venues by capacity
- Bruce Springsteen Center for American Music at Monmouth University
- The Aquarian Weekly
- The Turf Club
