= They Call It Late Night with Jason Kelce =

American late-night sports talk show

- Genre: Late-night talk show
- Presented by: Jason Kelce
- Starring: SNACKTIME (house band)
- Narrated by: Kylie Kelce
- Country of origin: United States
- Original language: English
- No. of seasons: 1
- No. of episodes: 5

Production
- Production locations: Union Transfer; Philadelphia, Pennsylvania
- Running time: 40 minutes
- Production companies: NFL Films; Skydance Sports; Wooderboy Productions

Original release
- Network: ESPN
- Release: January 4 – January 31, 2025

Related
- New Heights

They Call It Late Night with Jason Kelce is an American late-night sports talk show hosted by Jason Kelce, a retired National Football League player, broadcaster on ESPN and brother of NFL football player Travis Kelce. The weekly hour-long show was taped at Union Transfer in Philadelphia with SNACKTIME as the house band, and the first episode debuted on January 4, 2025 at 1:00 a.m. The show was not renewed for a second season.

== History ==
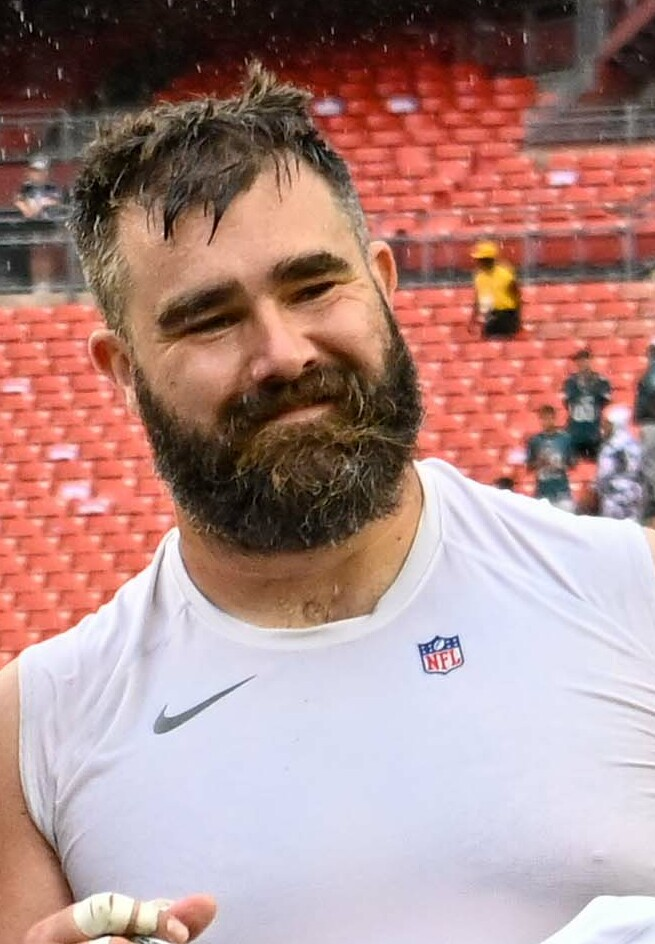
Host Jason Kelce played for 13 seasons in the NFL, all for the Philadelphia Eagles.

Since 2022, Jason Kelce has co-hosted a podcast known as New Heights, alongside his brother, professional football tight end Travis Kelce. After retiring from the NFL in 2024, Kelce joined ESPN as an analyst for Monday Night Countdown.

They Call It Late Night with Jason Kelce was first announced on November 21, 2024, when Kelce appeared as a guest on Jimmy Kimmel Live!. According to an ESPN press release, the show "will take its inspiration from traditional late-night television, emphasizing a comedic approach", and will mainly cover NFL storylines and feature notable NFL figures as guests. For the first season, the show will air for five consecutive Saturday mornings at 1:00 a.m. starting January 4, 2025, and running throughout the playoffs, with the final episode on February 1 airing at 1:30 a.m., one week before Super Bowl LIX. The show will be taped at Union Transfer in Philadelphia, the city in which Kelce played all 13 seasons of his professional football career with the Eagles. SNACKTIME, a soul, funk, and alternative band from Philadelphia, will serve as the show's house band.

During the show's reveal, Kelce cited his love for late-night shows growing up, specifically Late Night with Conan O'Brien. The show's title is a tribute to They Call It Pro Football, the first full-length film of NFL Films. NFL Films, which also originated in Philadelphia, will be working in conjunction with the show.

Along with airing on ESPN, repeats were be shown on ESPN2, and the show was be available to stream on ESPN+ and the YouTube channels for ESPN and Kelce himself.

In January 2026, it was reported that the show would not return for a second season.
