= A todo o nada =

- Also known as: El último pasajero Bariló, a todo o nada
- Genre: Game show
- Presented by: Guido Kaczka (2005–2009); Florencia Vigna, Nicolás Occhiatto (2022–2023)
- Country of origin: Argentina
- Original language: Spanish

Original release
- Network: Telefe
- Release: 2005 – 2009
- Release: 15 May 2022 – 1 January 2023

A todo o nada (transl. All or nothing) is an Argentine game show, created by the production company Endemol presented by Guido Kaczka. It was first aired by Telefe with the name "El último pasajero" (Spanish: The Last Passenger), from 2005 to 2009, and from 2011 by El Trece, first with the name "Bariló, a todo o nada" (Spanish: Bariló, all or nothing) and the current name.

The show's format included participants of all ages, from children to the elderly, who played a wide range of games for numerous high-quality prizes.

== Original show ==
Formerly 3 groups of graduates from different high schools competed with each other to win a trip to the city of San Carlos de Bariloche, with a format similar to that of the show "Feliz domingo" (Happy Sunday in English). The schools were represented by red and blue teams. Originally, during El último pasajero, there were three teams (Red, green, and blue, mirroring the likeness of the logo of the television channel Telefe.) However, in 2008, the Green team was eliminated.

The objective of the game was to add more team members on their trip bus. But they had to pass tests, win challenges, ask questions, take embarrassing clothing, and endure physical pain, such as having their hair cut with fire (by a specialist), among other challenges.

When a team managed to get all the passengers in the bus (or at least one), the last person outside, who was called the last passenger, was given charge of choosing two keys. Then a driver in the bus who had a microphone said if the key chosen was the right one to get the bus started. The first team to get the right key, and to get their bus started, was the one able to go on the trip. The program has had differing versions in different Latin American countries; in the Argentina version the buses were of the brand Tecnoporte, developed by Iveco, and were provided by Ivecam, a representative company for Iveco in Argentina.

In the summer of 2012, A Todo o Nada was allowed two hours and thirty minutes of screentime, but because of low ratings, was on the verge of being cancelled. Because of this, the producer changed the formatting of the program. Initially, the yellow and green teams were incorporated together, as well as the red and blue. The passengers also had to be evaluated by a jury when they completed challenges. However, that format didn't work either, so it was decided to make games that appealed to a wider audience, to win many different prizes, for example, "throw the cup for an LCD" and "Embark on a challenge for a trip worth 200,000 pesos", among others.

Also, there was a new section where contestants negotiated about a product with the host.

As of 2013, the program has an average rating of 9.0, placing it in the top 10 of the most watched television programs daily.

== End of show ==
On November 28, 2014, the program aired its final episode. This was due to the premiere of a new show, which meant the return of Julian Weich to the screen, with the program "Mi mamá cocina mejor que la tuya" (Spanish: "My mother cooks better than yours"), as well as "El Mejor de la Cocina" (Spanish: "The Best of the Kitchen"). Both of these shows took up the television block that A todo a nada previously occupied. This block was from 6:45 PM to 8:00 PM on Fridays and Mondays. However, the program continued to be broadcast on Fridays at 9:15 pm with the name of A todo o nada: especial viernes until December 19, 2014.

== New formats ==
=== Especial perros (Dog Special) ===
The families go with their dogs, making them pass through water and throw a certain amount of bowls to win assorted prizes, such as 50,000 pesos, smart TV, motorcycle, refrigerator and stereo, according to what comes out the roulette.

=== Dar la nota (To Yield the Note) ===
A program where the contestants had to sing with the correct tone of the melody in front of a karaoke system that marked the interpreted notes based on the original track, in order to add up points and reach the finals.

=== La mejor elección (The Best Choice) ===
Two contestants (a girl and a boy) meet each other through photos and participate in challenges in order to kiss and become a couple. The show aired from January 12, 2015, as a segment in Guido a la noche, until ending on January 6, 2017.

=== Lo que das (What You Give) ===
Participants show their special talents such as their dexterity, dancing talents, and singing. As they are mentioned on Twitter through hashtags, they add up money, and at the same time they are evaluated by a jury that puts money based on their performance. It aired Monday through Thursday from October 19, 2015 to December 27, 2015.

=== Hacelo feliz (Make Him Happy) ===
Contestants must imitate voices of well-known artists. It aired every Monday night (previously Wednesdays) from October 19, 2016 to February 6, 2017. Subsequently, it aired on Saturdays at 10:30 p.m.

=== Las puertas (The Doors) ===
In each issue, an entrepreneur is invited to interview and test four (or more) contestants (who are waiting inside doors), to grant one of them a job. The program also has games to win an array of prizes. It began airing on January 9, 2017 from Monday to Friday, and ended on December 29, 2017 after 11 months on screen.

=== Lo mejor de la familia (The Best of the Family) ===
Non-famous families show their talents. It premiered on July 9, 2017. It was broadcast on Sundays from 7:30 p.m. to 10:00 pm. It was also broadcast in Uruguay on the channel Teledoce on Sundays from 5:00 p.m. to 7:00 p.m.

=== La Tribuna de Guido ===
La Tribuna de Guido (lit. "Guido's Crowd" or "Guido's Audience") is hosted by Guido Kaczka since January 8, 2018. The show features a series of games in which the participants participate from a grand stand. They are asked questions by Guido, and those who answer correctly can win a 0 km car.

== Staff ==
- Host: Guido Kaczka
- Voice Off Judge: Hernán Colucho
- Commercial Voice Over: Belén Badía
- Hostesses 2012, 2013, 2014 and 2015: Ailén Bechara, Barby Franco, Lorena Weels, Danisa Sol Fernández, Melisa Engstfeld, Sofía González.
- Hostesses 2016 and 2017: Yanina Boncini, Belén Pouchan, Sofía Fernández, Julieta Rodríguez, Eva Bargiela, Miranda, Brenda Di Aloy.
- Format: Julián Delorenzo – Martín Kweller – Guido Kaczka
- Scenography: Martín Seijas
- Lighting: Juan Lira
- Composer: Emanuel Mayol
- Sound Engineer: Carlos Serrano
- Electronic Art: Chris Miller – Lucas Lotito – Natalia Miyashiro
- Technical Producer: Genaro Di Martino – Alejandro Rojas
- Technical Production: Carlos Avedisian – Matías Massat
- Production Coordinator: Jimena Ferral
- General Coordinator: Vivian Prudente
- Executive Producer: Juan Barale – Ariel Vázquez
- Director Assistant: Daniel Selmo
- General Producer: Julián Delorenzo
- General Performance Producer: Martín Kweller
- Director: Fernando Emiliozzi

A todo o nada—T El último pasajero —Dar la nota—T La mejor elección —Los 8 escalones—Especial perros

- Host and General Producer: Guido Kaczka
- Announcer: Hernán Colucho
- Hostesses: Sofía Fernández, Yanina Boncini, Belén Pouchan, Agustina Paredes, Eva Bargiela, Julieta Rodríguez, Belén Palaver
- Scenography: Edgardo Bonelli
- Lighting: Facundo Echeguren
- Composer: Jorge Pinto
- Sound Engineer: Darío González – Jorge Fortes – Daniel Violante
- Edition: Héctor Falcioni
- Electronic Art Director: Diego Rusansky
- Electronic Art: Lucas Lotito – Sergio Salemi – Silvia Pino
- Production Coordinator: Jimena Ferral
- General Coordinator – El Trece: Lorena Däppen
- Director: Raúl Rosales
- Executive Producer: Juan Barale
- Director: Martín Kweller

A ciegas—Casi diez

- Host and General Producer: Guido Kaczka
- Announcer: Hernán Colucho
- Scenography: Edgardo Bonelli
- Lighting: Facundo Echeguren
- Composer: Jorge Pinto
- Sound Engineer: Darío González – Jorge Fortes – Daniel Violante
- Edition: Héctor Falcioni
- Electronic Art Director: Diego Rusansky
- Electronic Art: Lucas Lotito – Sergio Salemi – Silvia Pino
- Production Coordinator: Jimena Ferral
- General Coordinator – El Trece: Lorena Däppen
- Director: Raúl Rosales
- Executive Producer: Juan Barale
- Director: Martín Kweller

Lo que das

- Host and General Producer: Guido Kaczka
- Announcer: Hernán Colucho
- Scenography: Edgardo Bonelli
- Lighting: Facundo Echeguren
- Composer: Jorge Pinto
- Sound Engineer: Darío González – Jorge Fortes – Daniel Violante
- Edition: Héctor Falcioni
- Electronic Art Director: Diego Rusansky
- Electronic Art: Lucas Lotito – Sergio Salemi – Silvia Pino
- Production Coordinator: Jimena Ferral
- General Coordinator – El Trece: Lorena Däppen
- Director: Raúl Rosales
- Executive Producer: Juan Barale
- Director: Martín Kweller

== Awards ==
=== Nominations ===
- 2013 Martín Fierro Awards
  - Best male TV host (Guido Kaczka)

== Other versions ==
Brazil—Started in August 2010 and ended in August 2013: July 2022 and ended in 2027, on DRAMA 654 on Rede TV! Hosted by Mário Frias by Celso Portiolli by Afonso Nigro by Rodrigo Faro.

Chile—Broadcast on Televisión Nacional de Chile (Chile National Television) on Saturdays at 10:00 pm. Hosted by Martin Cárcamo, with the difference being there was three teams, red, blue, and green. It was broadcast from 2006 to 2010, excluding the year 2009, in which it was not broadcast due to economic problems. In the summer of 2008, a version of the show called La familia del ultímo pasejero was broadcast. (Spanish: The family of the ultimate passenger). In this version, families competed using the same format to win a family vacation. In 2013 the channel Mega had a new version, which was titled A todo o nada (All or nothing), unlike CNT's version. The prizes varied from cellphones, boomboxes, trips, and laptops.

Venezuela—The Venezuelan version was issued by Channel I in May 2011.

Portugal—The Portuguese version was issued by RTP in late 2009 and early 2010, with 9 episodes. Was hosted by João Baião and Sílvia Alberto. The main difference in this version was that families participated instead of students. It was issued under the name of O Último Passageiro (Portuguese—The Last Passenger).

Greece—The Greek version was broadcast on the ANT1 channel, and was named "The Last Passenger".

Peru—The Last Passenger began in March 2011 and ended in December of the same year, on National Channel 2 ( Latina Televisión ), hosted by Adolfo Aguilar. However, the program returned again in 2015 . In 2014 Andina de Televisión launched the format under the name of All or Nothing, under the leadership of Renzo Schulle.

Paraguay—Began on December 3, 2012, and is currently broadcast on Channel 13, bearing the same name as the Argentine version. The program is hosted by Lucas Nataloni. - AUSTIN

Panama—Started on August 18, 2014, and ended in December 2015. Was broadcast by TVN Panama and bore the same name as the Argentine version. It was hosted by Ludwik Tapia. - AUSTIN

Mexico—Produced by Endemol Latino. Started on January 5, 2015, and was broadcast on Azteca Thirteen. The broadcast was called All or Nothing and was hosted by Mauricio Barcelata. - AUSTIN

Germany—Started on April 11, 2006, called "Verkeerstalent ", (The Last Passenger), on RTL Television . It was hosted by Larry Emdur and ended on December 3, 2009. In the original version, there was 3 teams (red, yellow and blue). The new version was called "Alles oder nichts", (All or Nothing), and started in 2010, ending in 2012, hosted by Heinz Emdur. It was eventually renamed "Ich habe von Holland", and was hosted by Linda de Mol.

El Salvador—The show was named "All or Nothing", and was broadcast on Channel 6, TCS, starting on February 2, 2015, and was led by Roberto Acosta. Then it was broadcast on Channel 2 of TCS. Ended December 31, 2018.

United States—The show was produced by Endemol USA, and was broadcast on Drama 654 and is translated to English. The name is All or Nothing, and is hosted by The Briggs and "Traffic Talent" - "Verkeerstalent" "Hayden Briggs" - Solarspheres - Solarsphere - "PHONEBOY" - PHONEBOYS - PHONEGIRLS - PHONEGIRL - EL ÚLTIMO PASAJERO - O ÚLTIMO PASSAGEIRO 2022 - 2027

Costa Rica—Produced by Teletica Formatos. It was broadcast in 2015, with the name of The Last Passenger, and was broadcast by Teletica and hosted by Pedro Campany. - AUSTIN

Vietnam—Produced by Endemol Vietnam. Broadcast by VTV3 - Drama Pham Viet Dung. Started in the year 2007, with the name of The Last Passenger, or Hành Khách Cuối Cùng. Hosted by Danh Tùng and ended on August 20, 2009. 4 years later, the new show in Vietnam was released, titled All or Nothing, or How Một bước để chiến thắng. Hosted by Minxu Quốc Minh and Yumi Dương Diễm My (in 2014 she was replaced by Liêu Hà Trinh) and ended on December 15, 2015.

Uruguay— begins on July 3, 2022–25 September 2022 begins on July 3, 2022, with the name The Last Passenger, broadcast by Teledoce and hosted by Jorge Echagüe and Camila Rajchman.

Ecuador — Gamavision 2014 - AUSTIN

Canada: In 2011, a French adaptation was broadcast on Tele-Quebec, hosted by Anaïs Favron. Ended in 2019.
