= Chacraseca =

- Town
- Location in Nicaragua
- Coordinates: 12°26′N 86°53′W
- Country: Nicaragua
- Department: León Department

Population
  - Urban: 8,000

Chacraseca is a town in Nicaragua.

There are about 8,000 people who live in the town, and over the past 18 years, the people in the town have been receiving aid from several groups in the United States. These groups include international organizations such as American Nicaraguan Foundation and Food for the Poor, as well as JustHope, an Oklahoma-based non-profit doing long-term development work with a partnership model; Students for 60,000, a high school non-profit organization based in Northport, NY, and students from, Bard College, Stonehill College, Miami Dade College, University of Michigan, and Stony Brook University PA Program. They also receive aid from the Health Outreach for Latin America Foundation (HOLA), an NPO based in Boulder, CO.

Over the past several years the organization JustHope (www.justhope.org) has partnered with MINSA (Nicaragua's Ministry of Health) and DoCare (www.docareintl.org), to increase access to and continuity of medical care in Chacraseca, by bringing physicians, physician assistants, and other health care professionals from New York, Oklahoma, Illinois, Florida, and various other locations, to supplement what the community clinic (also supported by JustHope and MINSA) is able to provide.

Chacraseca is located outside of the city of León, and has a very well developed elementary school system. The Comedor Escolar Project, is running well in the town, and children are able to receive education due to the help of groups such as Students for 60,000 and JustHope.
