= Snacktime (band) =

American soul band

Background information
- Origin: Philadelphia, Pennsylvania, U.S.
- Genres: Soul, Funk, Punk, Jazz, Hip-Hop, R&B
- Members: Nico Bryant; Sam Gellerstein; Austin Marlow; Larry Monroe Jr.; Eric Sherman; Michael Spearman; Ben Stocker

Snacktime, stylized as SNACKTIME, are an American soul, funk, alternative band from Philadelphia, Pennsylvania. The band was founded during the height of the COVID-19 pandemic in August 2020 when the group began performing free shows in Philadelphia's Rittenhouse Square.

== Career ==
The band was founded during the height of the COVID-19 pandemic in August 2020 when the group began performing free shows in Philadelphia's Rittenhouse Square and Passyunk Square. After the pandemic, the group started moving into more traditional venues, such as Philadelphia's Brooklyn Bowl and Theatre of Living Arts. The band has curated neighborhood festivals and food events with chefs including Michael Solomonov (Zahav), Marc Vetri, Michael Ferreri, and Jose Garces.

Snacktime has performed during Philadelphia 76ers halftime shows and also for Phillies and Philadelphia Union events.

Snacktime has been featured at major music festivals such as the Roots Picnic, Life Is Beautiful, Sea.Hear.Now, Sound on Sound Fest, Firefly, Peach Fest, Xponential Festival, and Adult Swim Festival. Snacktime performed a 6-hour set at Eric Andre's 40th Birthday Party at Knockdown Center. Snacktime opened for Portugal. The Man on their winter 2024 U.S. tour.

Snacktime tracked their studio debut, recorded and produced by Will Yip. A 12" single was released on February 1, 2024.

In November 2024, it was announced that Snacktime would serve as the house band for They Call It Late Night with Jason Kelce — an American late-night sports talk show hosted by retired Philadelphia Eagles player and current ESPN broadcaster Jason Kelce. The weekly hour-long show was taped at Union Transfer in Philadelphia, and the first episode debuted on January 4, 2025, at 1:00 a.m.

Yesseh Furaha-Ali left the group in July 2025. He was replaced by singer Nico Bryant.

== Members ==
- Nico Bryant – vocals
- Sam Gellerstein – bass guitar, sousaphone
- Austin Marlow – drums
- Larry Monroe Jr. – guitar
- Eric Sherman – trumpet, guitar
- Michael Spearman – trombone, keyboard
- Ben Stocker – tenor saxophone

== Past Members ==
Yesseh Furaha-Ali - Vocals, Alto Saxophone, Percussion
