= Guido Kaczka =

Argentine television host, actor and producer

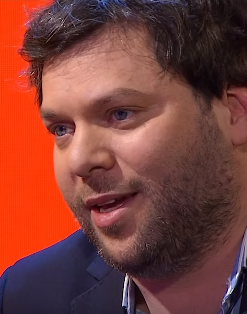
- Born: Guido Martín Kaczka; February 2, 1978 (age 48); Moreno, Buenos Aires, Argentina
- Occupations: Actor; Television presenter; Television Producer; Radio Host
- Years active: 1983–present
- Spouses: Florencia Bertotti (m. 2006; div. 2010); Soledad Rodríguez (m. 2018)
- Children: 4

Guido Martín Kaczka (born 2 February 1978) is an Argentine actor, television presenter, television producer and radio host.

== Biography ==
Guido Kaczka was born in Moreno, Buenos Aires on February 2, 1978, and grew up in the Buenos Aires districts of Villa Luro and La Paternal.

== Personal life ==
On December 2, 2006, Kaczka married actress Florencia Bertotti, whom he had met while recording the Argentine telenovela Verano del '98. On July 10, 2008, the couple's first child, who they named Romeo Kaczka Bertotti, was born in the Clínica Maternidad Suizo Argentina. The couple divorced in March 2010. They share custody of their son.

On November 25, 2014, his second child was born, a boy who they named Benjamín Kaczka. On March 14, 2017 his third child, a girl, was born, who they named Helena Kaczka. On April 7, 2018 he married Soledad Rodríguez in a civil ceremony. On June 2, 2021, his fourth child was born, a boy who they named Eliseo Kaczka.

== Career ==
At age 5, Guido Kaczka began to attend a studio, accompanying his sister Analía and his brother Emiliano, who participated in Pelito. After singing tangos for the producer, he was selected to act in a telecomedy on TV Pública. At age 7 he debuted in theater, in the children's play La pandilla aventurera.

In 2003, Kaczka was cast as the protagonist of the youth television series Rincón de luz with Soledad Pastorutti. In 2004, he was one of the main protagonists of the television series Los pensionados. From 2005 to 2009, he hosted an entertainment program in which two teams of students compete for a graduate trip to Bariloche, called El último pasajero.

In 2009, Kaczka led the first production of his production company Kaberplay, the youth television series Niní. His wife Florencia Bertotti was the protagonist of the show. In 2010, he was chosen by Telefe to be the host of a new entertainment program called Alto juego. In 2011, he began with a new program following the theme of El último pasajero called Bariló, a todo o nada. In 2014, he began working for the first time on the radio, conducting a program called No está todo dicho with Claudia Fontán and Luciana Geuna on the famous radio station La 100. At first, the program was broadcast in the early morning, but after the arrival of Santiago del Moro with El Club del Moro, Guido Kakzca went on to occupy the strip from 9 to 13, changing the dynamics and format of the program.

He is currently the presenter of the TV show Es mi sueño broadcast on eltrece.

== Filmography ==
=== Television ===
| Year | Title | Character | Channel |
|---|---|---|---|
| 1983-1986 | Pelito | Mariano | Canal 13 |
| 1987-1990 | Clave de sol | Quique | Canal 13 |
| 1991 | El árbol azul | Daniel Figueroa | Canal 13 |
| 1991 | Alta comedia | Nicolás | Canal 9 |
| 1992-1994 | ¡Grande, pá! | Lucas | Telefe |
| 1995-1998 | Chiquititas | Felipe "Piojo" Fraga | Telefe |
| 1999-2000 | Verano del '98 | Octavio Levin | Telefe |
| 2002-2003 | Máximo Corazón | Pablo Mendoza | Telefe |
| 2003 | Rincón de luz | Álvaro del Solar | América TV |
| 2004 | Los pensionados | Alejandro Carrizo | Canal 13 |
| 2004 | Floricienta | Alejandro | Canal 13 |
| 2005 | Casados con Hijos | Hugo Pardo | Telefe |
| 2011 | Los únicos | | Canal 13 |
| 2013 | Solamente vos | | Canal 13 |
| 2018 | El host | Dog owner | Fox |

=== Television Programs ===
| Year | Program | Channel | Notes |
|---|---|---|---|
| 1997-2001 | Polémica en el bar | Telefe | Humorist |
| 1999 | Trip | Telefe | Host |
| 1999-2000 | Mis mejores amigos | Telefe | Host |
| 2005-2009 | El último pasajero | Telefe | Host |
| 2010 | Alto juego | Telefe | Host |
| 2011-2014 | A todo o nada | Canal 13 | Host |
| 2011-2022 | Un sol para los chicos | Canal 13 | Co-Host |
| 2014 | Martín Fierro Awards | Canal 13 | Co-Host |
| 2014-2015 | Los 8 escalones | Canal 13 | Host |
| 2015 | Lo que das | Canal 13 | Host |
| 2015 | Martín Fierro Awards | Canal 13 | Co-Host |
| 2015-2017 | Guido a la noche | Canal 13 | Host |
| 2016 | Especial perros | Canal 13 | Host |
| 2016 | Martín Fierro Awards | Canal 13 | Co-Host |
| 2016-2017 | Hacelo feliz | Canal 13 | Host |
| 2017 | Lo mejor de la familia | Canal 13 | Host |
| 2017 | Las Puertas | Canal 13 | Host |
| 2017 | Martín Fierro Awards | Canal 13 | Co-Host |
| 2018 | La tribuna de Guido | Canal 13 | Host |
| 2019 | El perro del millón | Canal 13 | Host |
| 2019 | Otra noche familiar | Canal 13 | Host |
| 2019 | Cinco pasos y una ayuda | Canal 13 | Host |
| 2020-2022 | Bienvenidos a bordo | Canal 13 | Host |
| 2020 | Unidos por Argentina | Canal 13 | Host |
| 2021-2022 | Los 8 escalones del millón | Canal 13 | Host |

=== Movies ===
| Year | Movie | Character | Director |
|---|---|---|---|
| 2005 | Chicken Little | Chicken Little (Second Dubbed Version) | Mark Dindal |

== Awards and nominations ==
| Year | Award | Category | Work | Result |
|---|---|---|---|---|
| 1997 | Martín Fierro Awards | Best new talent | Polémica en el bar | Nominated |
| 2013 | Martín Fierro Awards | Best Male Presenter | A todo o nada | Nominated |
| 2015 | Martín Fierro Awards | Entertainment Program | Los 8 escalones | Winner |
| 2017 | Martín Fierro Awards | Best Male Presenter | A todo o nada | Winner |
| 2019 | Martín Fierro Awards | Best Male Presenter | A todo o nada | Winner |
| 2022 | Martín Fierro Awards | Gold Martín Fierro | Herself | Winner |
