= Makua =

Makua may refer to:

- Makua (person), an alaafin of the Oyo Empire
- Makua people, an ethnic group in Mozambique and Tanzania
- Makhuwa language, a Bantu language spoken in Mozambique
- Makua languages, a branch of Bantu languages
- Makua Rothman (born 1984), American world champion surfer

== See also ==
- Makuv'a language, a language of East Timor
- Macuá
