= Macuá =

Nicaraguan Beverage

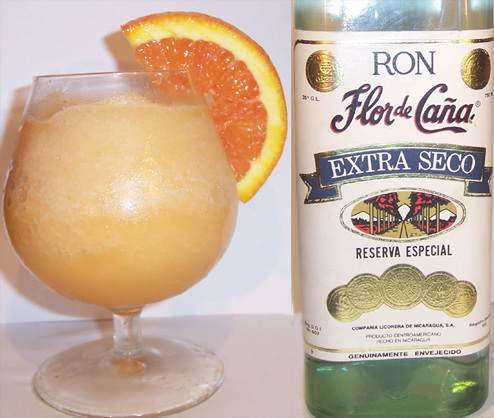
- Frozen Macuá made with Flor de Caña extra dry brand.
- Type: Cocktail
- Ingredients: 2 parts white rum (preferably Flor de Caña); 2 parts guava juice; 1 part lemon juice; sugar to taste
- Base spirit: Rum
- Standard drinkware: Highball glass
- Standard garnish: lemon slice
- Served: On the rocks
- Preparation: Blend the ingredients with 1 cup of ice and serve well chilled. Garnish with an orange slice

The Macuá is a cocktail made with white rum and fruit juices, usually lemon and guava juice. The Macuá is noted as the national drink of Nicaragua. The drink is named after pajaro macuá, a tropical bird native to the country.

== History ==
The Macuá was invented by Edmundo Miranda, a pediatrician from Granada, a small and historic city on the shores of Lake Nicaragua. Miranda enlisted the help of his immediate family, including his wife, daughter and son-in-law, to perfect the recipe.

The Nicaraguan Tour Operator Solentiname Tours and the Association of Restaurants in Nicaragua recognized a need for a national drink. Both invited hotel and restaurant owners across Nicaragua to come together and enlisted the help of CEM-JWT Communications, a Nicaraguan advertising agency, to turn the idea into a reality.

The drink rose to fame in October 2006, when it was entered in a competition to choose a national drink of Nicaragua. The competition, sponsored by Flor de Caña, a Nicaraguan rum manufacturer, involved more than twenty different drinks based on the company's products. The judges, including the French ambassador and a cocktail connoisseur from a Swedish development agency, chose the Macuá over other combinations of local ingredients including pineapple, tamarind and even coffee beans. More adventurous entrants made use of some of Nicaragua's most obscure flora such as the mamoncillo, the extract of which is used as a local cure for stomachache.

== Criticism ==
This drink was created for a contest looking to creating a symbol that inspires national identity, such as Lake Cocibolca and the archaeological sites in Isla Zapatera, Ometepe and Solentiname, which make the lake a unique destination in the world.

The Contest, called "The Nacional Drink Contest", (El Trago Nacional), was sponsored by Flor de Caña, Hotel Intercontinental, Solentiname Tours, Morgan's Rock, Canatur, INTUR, and Radio Tigre. The presence of the INTUR (National Tourism Institute) validated the contest as an "official" selection, even if organized by private investors, not the government.

The contest was divided in two parts: the selection of the recipe, and the selection of the name.

However, El Nuevo Diario criticized the theme of the contest for selecting only a few regions of the country for defining the national identity (Lake Cocibolca and Granada), and that the selected winning recipe for the contest required to contain a minimum of 50% Flor de Caña rum, the sponsoring liquor company.
