= Es mi sueño =

- Also known as: Es mi sueño
- Genre: Talent show
- Presented by: Guido Kaczka
- Judges: Abel Pintos; Jimena Barón; Joaquín Levinton; Jose Luis Rodriguez; Natalie Pérez
- Opening theme: «Todo de mi» (composed by Mateo Rodó, Abel Pintos, Ale Zéguer and Raquel Sofía, performed by Abel Pintos)
- Country of origin: Argentina
- Original language: Spanish
- No. of seasons: 2
- No. of episodes: 113

Production
- Producer: Martín Kweller
- Production locations: Buenos Aires, Argentina
- Running time: 90 min.
- Production company: Kuarzo Entertainment Argentina

Original release
- Network: eltrece
- Release: 9 March – 18 August 2026
- Release: 19 August 2026 – present

Es mí sueño (English: It's my dream) is an Argentine TV Show created by Kuarzo Entertainment Argentina. The show is currently aired on eltrece and its first season premiered on March 9, 2026. Guido Kaczka is the current host.

During the broadcast of the first season, the channel confirmed the production of a second season, which would include the participation of celebrities. This season premiered on August 19, 2026.

== Overview ==
In January 2026, it was reported that eltrece was producing a talent show that would be hosted by Guido Kaczka during the channel's prime-time programming. The following month, it was confirmed that the program's title would be "Es mi sueño," that it would feature a jury made up of four prominent figures in the music industry, and that it would premiere on March 9.

Shortly afterwards, it was announced that the jury for the first season would consist of folk singer Abel Pintos, cuarteto singer La Mona Jiménez, and singer and actress Jimena Barón, and singer Joaquín Levinton, vocalist of the rock band Turf.

During the first season, Carlos Baute, Natalie Pérez, Ángela Leiva and Nahuel Pennisi participated as guest judges, replacing some of the regular members.

== Seasons ==
Season	Chapters	Premiere	Final	Winner	Audience
1	112	March 9, 2026	August 18, 2026	Margarita Ponce	TBA
2	—	August 19, 2026	—	In progress	
