= Carlos Pellas Chamorro =

Nicaraguan businessman (born 1953)

- Born: January 10, 1953 (age 73); Granada, Nicaragua
- Education: Stanford University
- Occupation: CEO of Grupo Pellas
- Years active: 2000–present
- Spouse: Vivian Pellas (m. 1976)
- Children: 3
- Parent(s): Alfredo Pellas (father); Adela Chamorro (mother)
- Awards: Entrepreneur of the Year 2014 in El Economista magazine

Carlos Pellas Chamorro is a Nicaraguan businessman. The controlling shareholder of Grupo Pellas, Pellas is Nicaragua's first billionaire.

== Early life and education ==
Carlos Francisco Pellas Chamorro was born in Granada, Nicaragua, on January 10, 1953. He is the son of Alfredo Pellas Chamorro and Carmen Chamorro Benard. Pellas studied at Colegio Centroamérica. He is married to Vivian Fernández, with whom he has three children. He obtained his BA in economics and later an MBA from Stanford University.

== Plane crash ==
On October 21, 1989, Pellas and his wife were on a plane crash in a Boeing 727 of the Honduran airline SAHSA. The plane traveling from Managua to Miami was scheduled to stop in Tegucigalpa, but shortly before landing there, it crashed into Cerro de Hule mountain. Vivian Fernandez suffered serious burns on much of her body, as well as suffering 62 fractures, and undergoing more than 20 surgeries. Carlos Pellas lost the phalanges of four fingers from his left hand – he uses prosthesis - and he suffered several burns on his right hand and arm.

== Civic involvement ==
Pellas is a board member and vice-president of the INCAE Business School, a graduate business school in Central America., chaired by his, distributes approximately 120 million dollars a year in donations in favor of the most vulnerable population in Nicaragua. Asociación Pro-Niños Quemados de Nicaragua (APROQUEN), headed by his wife Vivian, has provided more than 650,000 health services, free of charges, including 34,000 surgeries, to improve the lives of burned children in Nicaragua since 1991.

He is the President of Centro Empresarial Pellas (CEP), which promotes entrepreneurship through the strengthening of small and medium-sized enterprises. CEP has supported over 1000 SMEs, helping them increase sales by 37% and generate over two thousand new jobs, and of International Game Fish Association, a non-profit organization dedicated to the protection of game fish throughout the world. He is also a member of the President's Leadership Council of the Inter-American Dialogue.

== Personal life ==
His brother Alfredo Pellas is the president and co-founder of the American Nicaraguan Foundation (ANF).

He is a distant relative of the Chamorro family.

== Awards ==
The Chambers of Commerce of Latin America in USA named Pellas "Businessman of the Year" in 2005. Top executives and entrepreneurs from Central America have chosen him in the last five years as one of the most admired businessmen in the region. He was distinguished in April 2008 by the President of Italy with the Order of the Stella Della Solidarietá Italiana in Grande Ufficiale. In October 2008 he was named Honorary Consul of Italy in Granada, Nicaragua.
