= Flor de Caña =

Brand of premium rum in Nicaragua

- Type: Rum
- Manufacturer: Compañía Licorera de Nicaragua, S.A.
- Distributor: William Grant & Sons (US Import)
- Origin: Nicaragua
- Introduced: 1937
- Alcohol by volume: 40 - 45%
- Proof (US): 80 - 90
- Colour: White and Dark
- Related products: List of rum producers
- Website: FlordeCana.com

Flor de Caña (Spanish for "sugarcane flower") is a brand of premium rum manufactured and distributed by Compañía Licorera de Nicaragua, S.A., (CLNSA) which is headquartered in Managua, Nicaragua. It is currently owned by billionaire Carlos Pellas Chamorro, the fifth generation owner of this company. Rum has been produced at Nicaragua Sugar Estates Limited since 1890, and the Flor de Caña brand was created in 1937.

== History ==
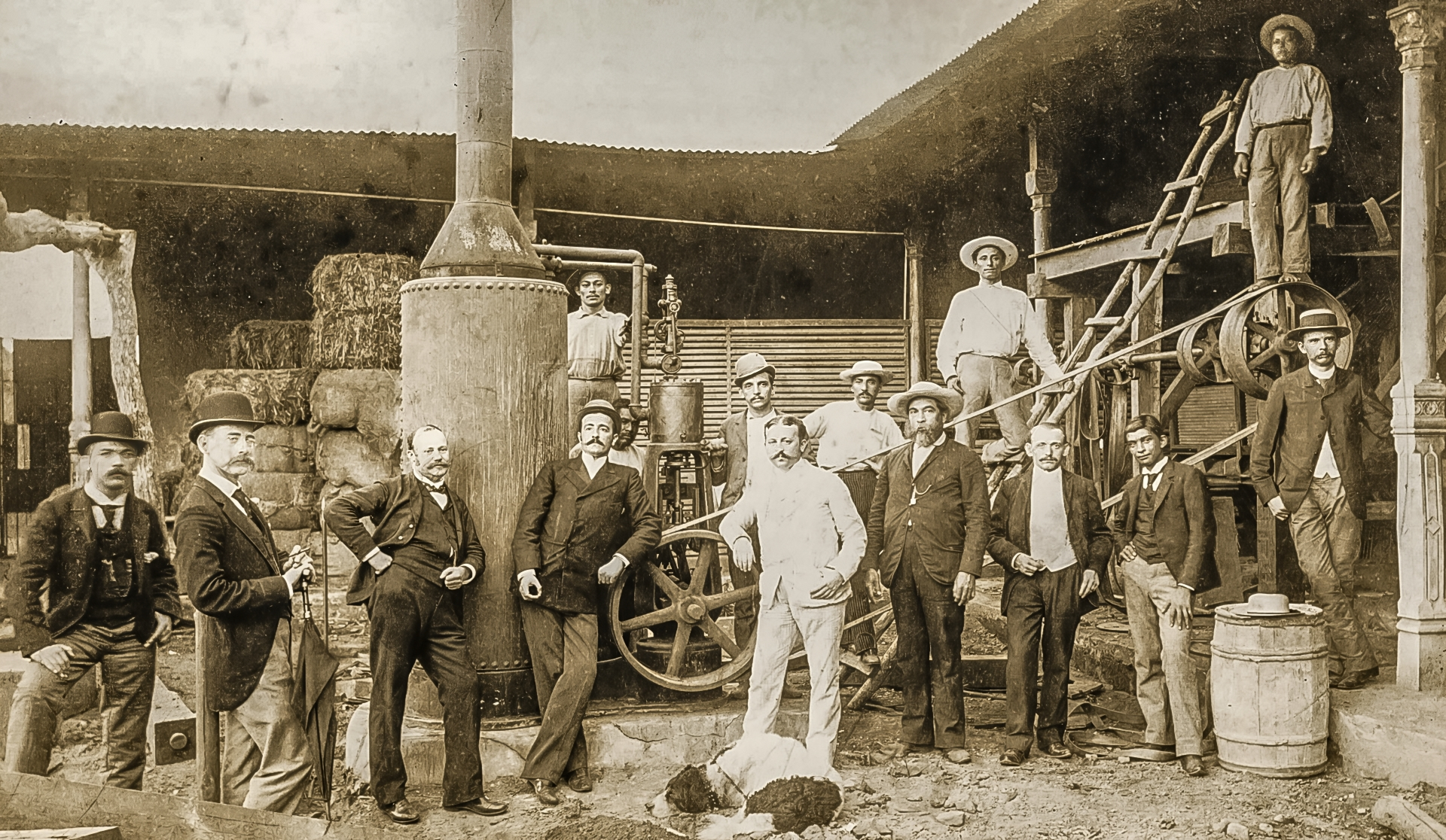
The original employees of Nicaragua Sugar Estates Limited at the Ingenio San Antonio, posing in front of a boiler and sugarcane processing equipment, circa 1890.

In 1875, 25-year-old Francisco Alfredo Pellas Canessa immigrated to Nicaragua from Genoa, Italy, in order to oversee the shipping business of his father, Carlos Napoleon. He decided to stay in the country, and with financial assistance from his father, he created a shipping company of 23 steamboats on Lake Nicaragua to connect the Atlantic and Pacific Oceans through Nicaragua. His hope was that the US would build a canal through Nicaragua, however, following the start of construction on the Panama Canal and the expansion of the transcontinental railroad, Pellas sold the shipping company.

In 1890, five businessmen, with Pellas being the majority shareholder, founded Nicaragua Sugar Estates Limited in Chichigalpa, at the base of the San Cristóbal volcano pictured on the labels, and registered the company in London, England. At this time, rum started to be produced and aged, but in small quantities to be shared with employees and partners. Pellas was made director of the company by 1908, and in 1912 the company installed new equipment and hired distillation experts for their rum production. In 1937, the Flor de Caña brand was registered, with Etiqueta Amarilla and Etiqueta Roja being the first two expressions. Alfredo Pellas Chamorro is credited with creating Compañía Licorera de Nicaragua, S.A. (CLNSA) in 1954, as well as modernizing the sugar plant in 1963, increasing output six-fold. In 1959, Flor de Caña began to be exported to other markets, first to Central American countries.

In 1971, due to political instability in the country, CLNSA began construction of a new distillery in neighboring Honduras. Following the Nicaraguan Revolution in 1979, the Sandinistas strictly controlled the company, and so during the 1980s, Flor de Caña rum was stored in large quantities due to the loss of control over the export market. In 1988, the properties of the company were nationalized by the government.

However, Carlos Pellas Chamorro, great-grandson of Francisco Alfredo Pellas Canessa, decided to stay in Nicaragua, stating that "there is no way this is going to last for long". By 1990, Flor de Caña had the largest reserve of aged rum in the world, however, with the election of family member Violeta Chamorro to the presidency of Nicaragua in 1990, the companies were returned to Pellas in 1992. Following the return to ownership, in 1996, the distillery was modernized once again, expanding into bio-fuels to self-sustain the company, and beginning the export of alcohol and rum in bulk to third parties.

The company now sponsors the Flor de Caña Open, an event on the PGA Tour Latinoamérica, in addition to international bar-mixing competitions. It also sponsors international fishing tournaments of the International Game Fish Association. In 2017 Flor de Caña was recognized at the International Wine and Spirit Competition as the Global Rum Producer of the Year. The company has close ties with the Nicaraguan government, and was accused of using the police to shoot protesters in 2014 and 2018.

== Organization ==
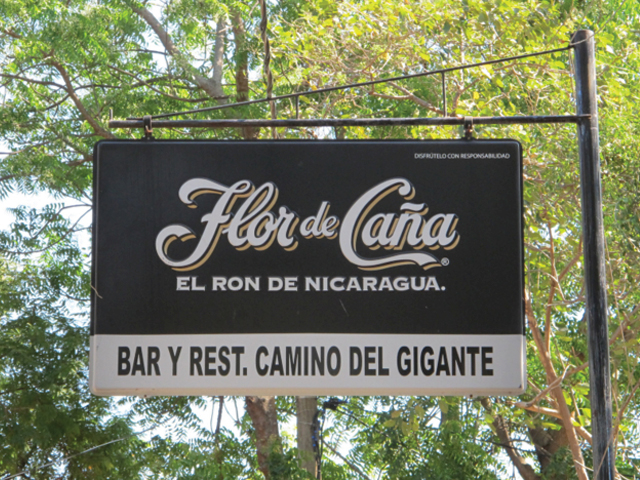

Carlos Pellas Chamorro is the president of Flor de Caña, as well as the controlling shareholder of Grupo Pellas. Flor de Caña is vertically integrated, with the Pellas Group owning the Ingenio San Antonio (ISA) sugarcane plantation, four sugar mills (Ingenio San Antonio in Nicaragua, Chumbagua in Honduras, Chabil Utzaj in Guatemala, and San Carlos in Panama), and the CLNSA distillery and its cooperage. In total, the Pellas Group represents 13% of the GDP of Nicaragua. Pellas is Nicaragua's first billionaire, and has close ties with the president, Daniel Ortega.

Tomás Cano is the master blender at Flor de Caña.

== Production ==
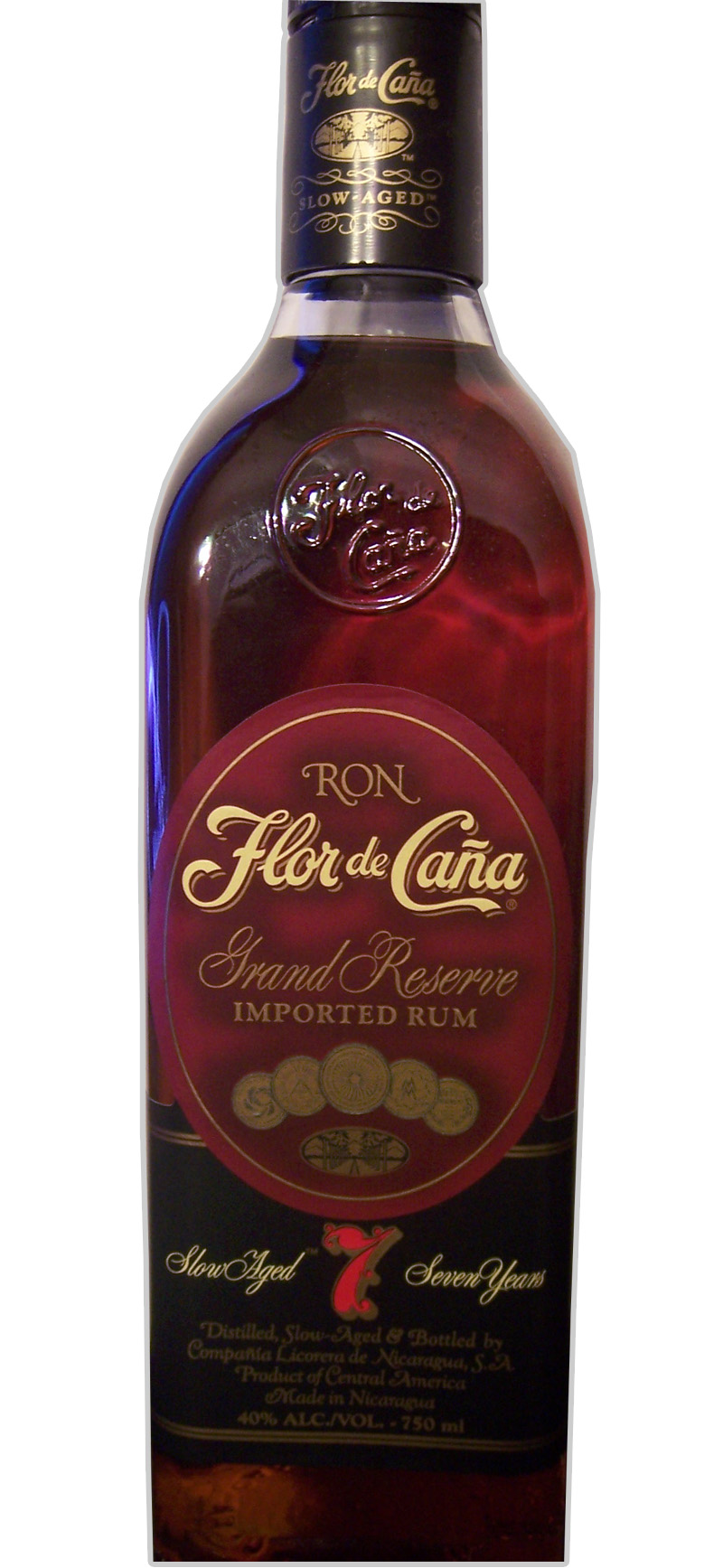
A bottle of Flor de Caña Grand Reserve Slow Aged 7 Years

Flor de Caña is a single-estate rum, as the sugarcane plantation, molasses production, distillation, and aging all happen on-site. The ash from the nearby San Cristóbal volcano provides fertilizer for the sugarcane fields. The molasses from the sugar factory is pasteurized, diluted, then inoculated with a proprietary yeast to be fermented in open and closed fermenters for approximately 36 hours. Waste carbon dioxide is collected and sold to Coca-Cola for use in bottling.

The resulting wine is finished at 9% ABV, and is distilled in a five-column still, with different combinations of columns used to produce different marks. These columns produce light, relatively neutral spirit at 96% ABV, common in Spanish-style rums, though unlike many other Spanish-style rums, which are typically sweetened, Flor de Caña claims to not add any additives or sugar after distillation.

Aging happens at an on-site warehouse, where 320,000 barrels continuously age. The rums are diluted to 77% ABV, then aged exclusively in re-charred ex-bourbon whiskey American oak barrels which are sealed with local plantain leaves. Barrels of the same vintage are occasionally consolidated to reduce loss to evaporation.

Flor de Caña used to make age statements on their labels, for example, "18 Years Old", but have since transitioned to simply "Centenario 18 Slow Aged", without explicitly making an age statement. However, a class-action lawsuit was filed against the makers of Flor de Caña for misrepresenting age. The plaintiff alleged that the number "18" prominently on the label of Flor de Caña 18 followed by the words "slow aged" has misled them into buying a rum that is not 18 years old.

The distillery was certified fair trade in 2018 by Fair Trade USA and is carbon neutral.

=== Work conditions ===
Over 20,000 people died of chronic kidney disease (CKD) in Central America from 1995 to 2015, with most of them being sugarcane field workers on the Pacific coast, with 46% of all male deaths in Chichigalpa being attributed to the disease. CKD has been linked to poor work conditions, such as long hours, and insufficient shade, rest, and water. A report found that workers can work from 5 or 6 a.m to 8 p.m. during the zafra (harvest) season, during the hottest months of the year, with "no trace of water or shade to be found", strict quotas enforced, and violence employed against workers and intimidation and arrests by police for speaking out or protesting.

Workers at ISA, the sugarcane field that is owned by the same conglomerate as Flor de Caña, have accused the company of sickening and abandoning them, such as firing workers for getting sick and withholding medical records to cover up responsibility and avoid paying compensation. A study found that 12% of workers at the end of a harvest season suffer from CKD, and that the hardest workers have the highest rates of this disease. Also, 21% of workers dropped out before the end-of-season testing, and home follow-ups revealed that nearly a third of them had developed CDK, suggesting that the true rate of the disease was undercounted. Workers have used false IDs in order to work despite being sick or being minors. In response, ISA stated that "The company cannot compensate for something that it has not caused." and "There is no possibility that there is a sick person or a minor." ISA also asserted that it utilizes best practices for worker hydration, rest, and shade. The company has sent mobile clinics to its fields, and owns a hospital which offers healthcare to the workers.

However, following widespread criticism, the company took matters seriously and instituted the Adelante Initiative, which included ceasing subcontracting which allowed for the sick and minors to work, and took direct responsibility for all workers, including improving rest and water consumption. An investigative journalist who first broke the story said that, while they can't discharge responsibility due to the company taking too long to do the right thing, they now work with the company to improve conditions, and "we have surpassed all expectations".

== Products ==
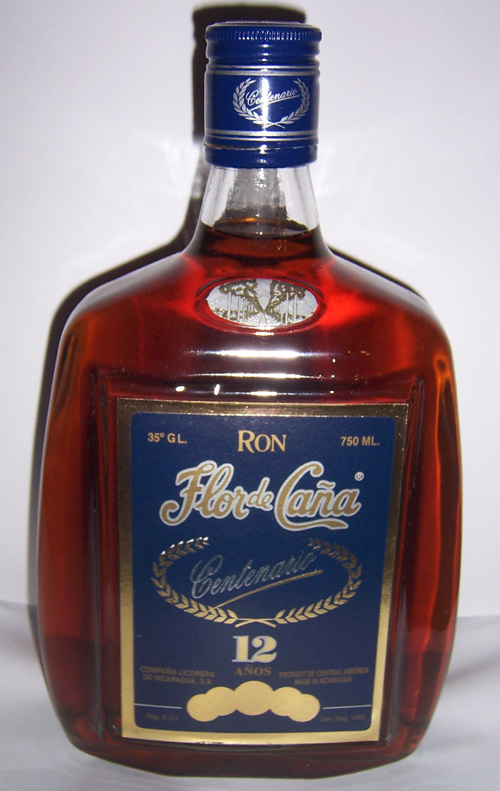
A bottle of Flor de Caña Centenario 12 Años

Flor de Caña produces both white and dark rums.

- Ultra Coco 4
- Ultra Lite 4
- Extra Lite 4
- Extra Seco 4
- Añejo Oro 4
- Añejo Clásico 5
- Gran Reserva 7
- Blanco Reserva 7
- Spresso
- Flor de Caña 12
- Flor de Caña 18
- Flor de Cana 25
