= Phoneboy =

American alternative rock band (e. 2018)

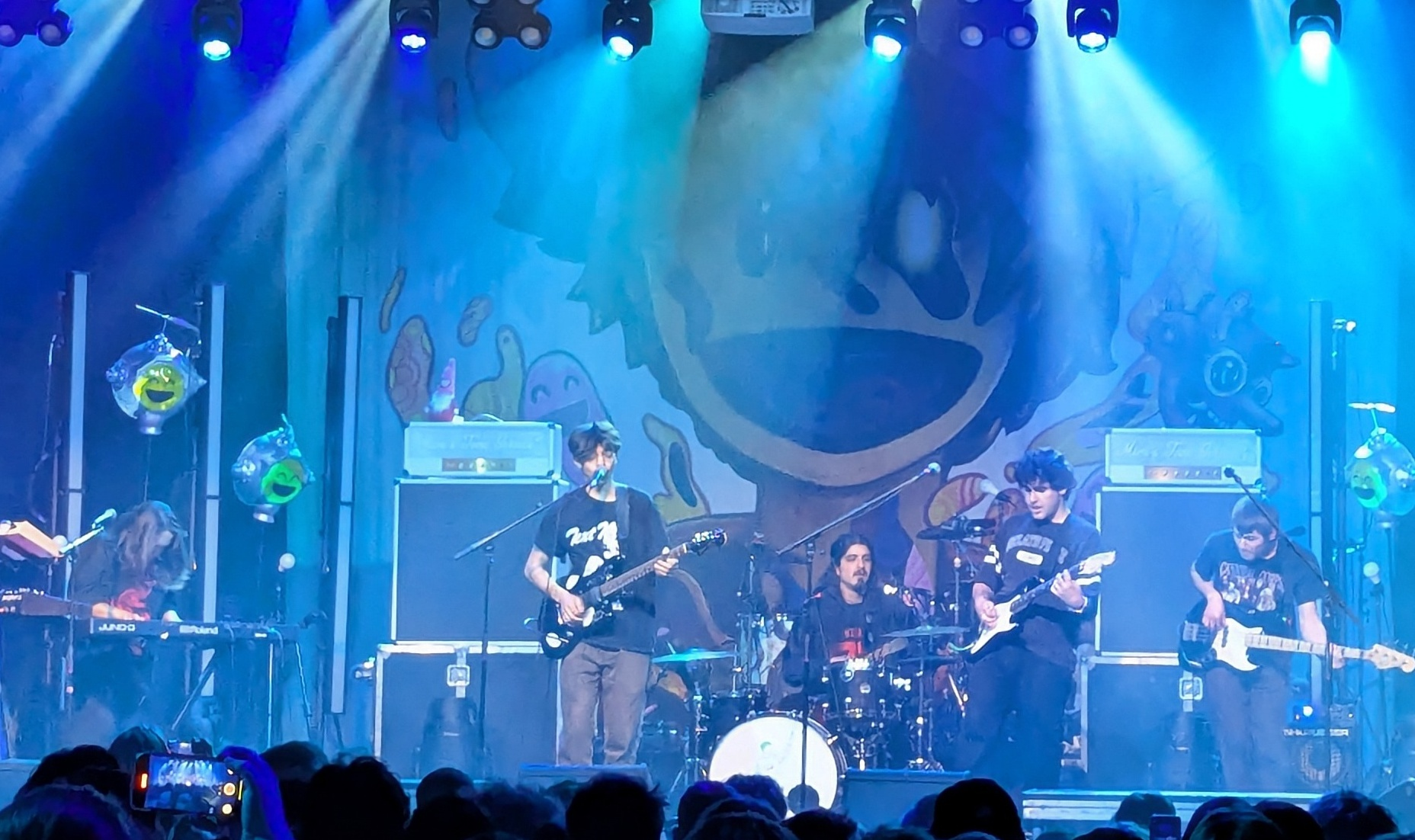
- Phoneboy performing at Bogart's on tour with Good Kid in 2025

Background information
- Origin: Hoboken, New Jersey, U.S.
- Genres: Alternative rock, indie rock, indie pop
- Years active: 2018–present
- Label: AWAL
- Members: Wyn Barnum; Ricky Dana; James Fusco; Jordan Torres
- Website: phoneboy.band

Phoneboy are an American alternative/indie rock band from Hoboken, New Jersey, United States, formed in 2018. The band consists of singer/guitarists Wyn Barnum and Ricky Dana, bassist James Fusco, and singer/keyboardist Jordan Torres.

== Creation ==
Wyn Barnum decided to create the band with Ricky Dana after meeting each other at Stevens Institute of Technology that didn't have a large "Indie scene". They also decided to bring in Barnum's childhood friend, James Fusco, and the three of them bonded over their love of music and decided to form the band. They had thought of the name for the band to be 'Wyn and Ricky' but decide to change it to 'Phoneboy' in reference to Dana's phone usage. When asked about their inspiration, the band responded that they were inspired by the Arctic Monkeys, the Strokes, and Rex Orange County.

== Career ==
Initially, Phoneboy played local gigs around Hoboken, New Jersey to improve Stevens' music scene.

On April 23, 2021, Phoneboy released their self-titled debut album Phoneboy, featuring Justin Magnaye on "Nevermind".

In December 2022, Phoneboy went on a tour with the Happy Fits and Daisy the Great, as the opening act.

On March 24, 2023, Phoneboy released a new album, Moving Out. It was preceded by the singles "Runaway", "Ferrari", "What a Coward", and "Your Apartment". Phoneboy also went on a tour to celebrate.

In 2024, Phoneboy released a new single, "I Look Alive", having their keyboardist, Jordan Torres, sing for the first time. This was followed by "Better Than You" in February 2025 alongside the announcement of their third album Heartbreak Designer. The third single, "Red Wine" was released in March 2025. The album's fourth and final single, "Talking to Heads", was released in April 2025. Heartbreak Designer was officially released on April 25, 2025, with "The Heartbreak Designer Tour" following shortly after.

In February 2025, Phoneboy joined Canadian indie rock band Good Kid on their "Chaos Kid" Tour as the opening act.

In October and November 2025, Phoneboy toured as one of the opening acts for The Wrecks on their "INSIDE : OUTSIDE Tour (Continued)".

In April and May 2026, Phoneboy toured with Heart Attack Man as co-headliners, with openers Slow Joy and Pony.

The band has released featured merch, depicting symbols of their band, such as the iconic "Roses are Dead".

== Members ==
- Wyn Barnum – vocals, guitar (2018–present)
- Ricky Dana – vocals, guitar (2018–present)
- James Fusco – bass (2018–present)
- Jordan Torres – keyboards (2018–present), vocals (2024–present)

== Discography ==
=== Studio albums ===
List of studio albums, with release dates
Title	Details
Phoneboy	Released: April 23, 2021; Label: Self-released as Phoneboy Music
Moving Out	Released: March 24, 2023; Label: Self-released as Phoneboy Music
Heartbreak Designer	Released: April 25, 2025; Label: Self-released as Phoneboy Music

=== EPs ===
List of extended plays, with release dates
Title	Details
Your Apartment	Released: March 2, 2023; Label: Self-released as Phoneboy Music

=== Singles ===
List of singles, showing year released
Title	Year	Album
"Runaway"	2022	Your Apartment / Moving Out
"Ferrari"	2023	Your Apartment / Moving Out
"What a Coward"	2023	Your Apartment / Moving Out
"I Look Alive"	2024	Heartbreak Designer
"I Look Alive (Acoustic)"	2024	Non-album single
"Better Than You"	2025	Heartbreak Designer
"Red Wine"	2025	Heartbreak Designer
