= Union Transfer =

Music venue in Philadelphia, Pennsylvania

Coordinates: 39.96148°N 75.15531°W

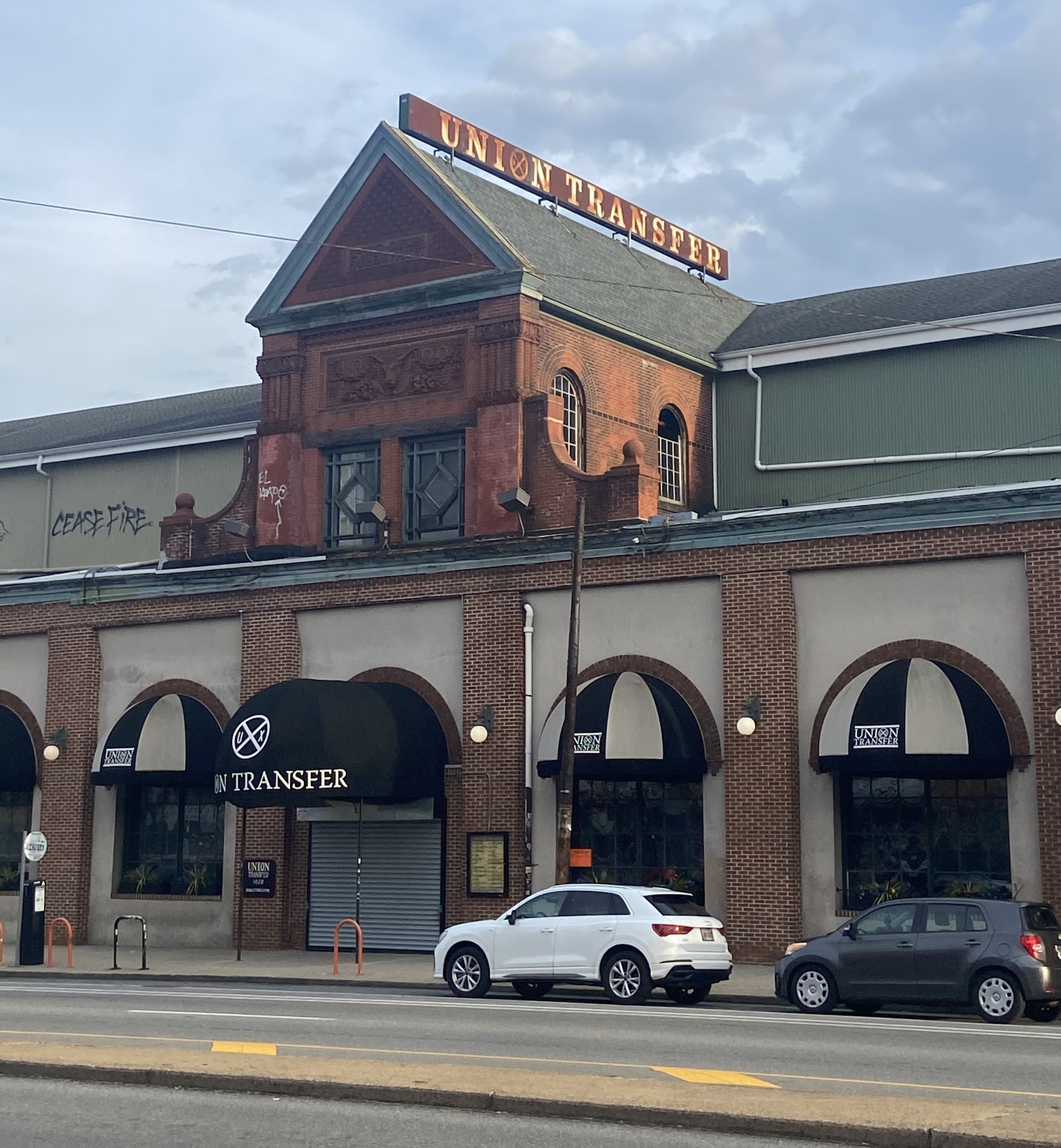
- Interactive map of Union Transfer
- Address: 1026 Spring Garden St.
- Location: Philadelphia, Pennsylvania
- Owner: R5 Productions and The Bowery Presents.
- Capacity: 1,200

Construction
- Built: 1889
- Opened: 2011

Website
- www.utphilly.com

Union Transfer is a music venue in Philadelphia, Pennsylvania. Located at 1026 Spring Garden Street in the Callowhill neighborhood, it opened on September 21, 2011, as a joint venture between The Bowery Presents, a New York City production company now owned by AEG Live; and R5 Productions, an independent Philadelphia production company.

== History ==
Its 1889 building retains signage for its original tenant, the Spring Garden Farmer's Market. From 1918 to 1942, the building housed the Union Transfer Baggage Express Co., storing bags and other items for the railway company; later, it housed a tire shop, a trust company, and a Spaghetti Warehouse restaurant.

Union Transfer is a smallish, independent venue that hosts bands, comedy, and performing acts. Acts that have played there include Blondshell, Tame Impala, Pond, Mischief Brew, M83, Diplo, Frank Ocean, The Murder City Devils, Cold War Kids, Jim James, Dinosaur Jr, The Tallest Man on Earth, Best Coast, and Cock Sparrer. Union Transfer sells beer from Yards Brewing Company and other local products.

The coat check is named after Japanese Breakfast's Michelle Zauner, who worked there in the 2010s.

=== Gallery ===
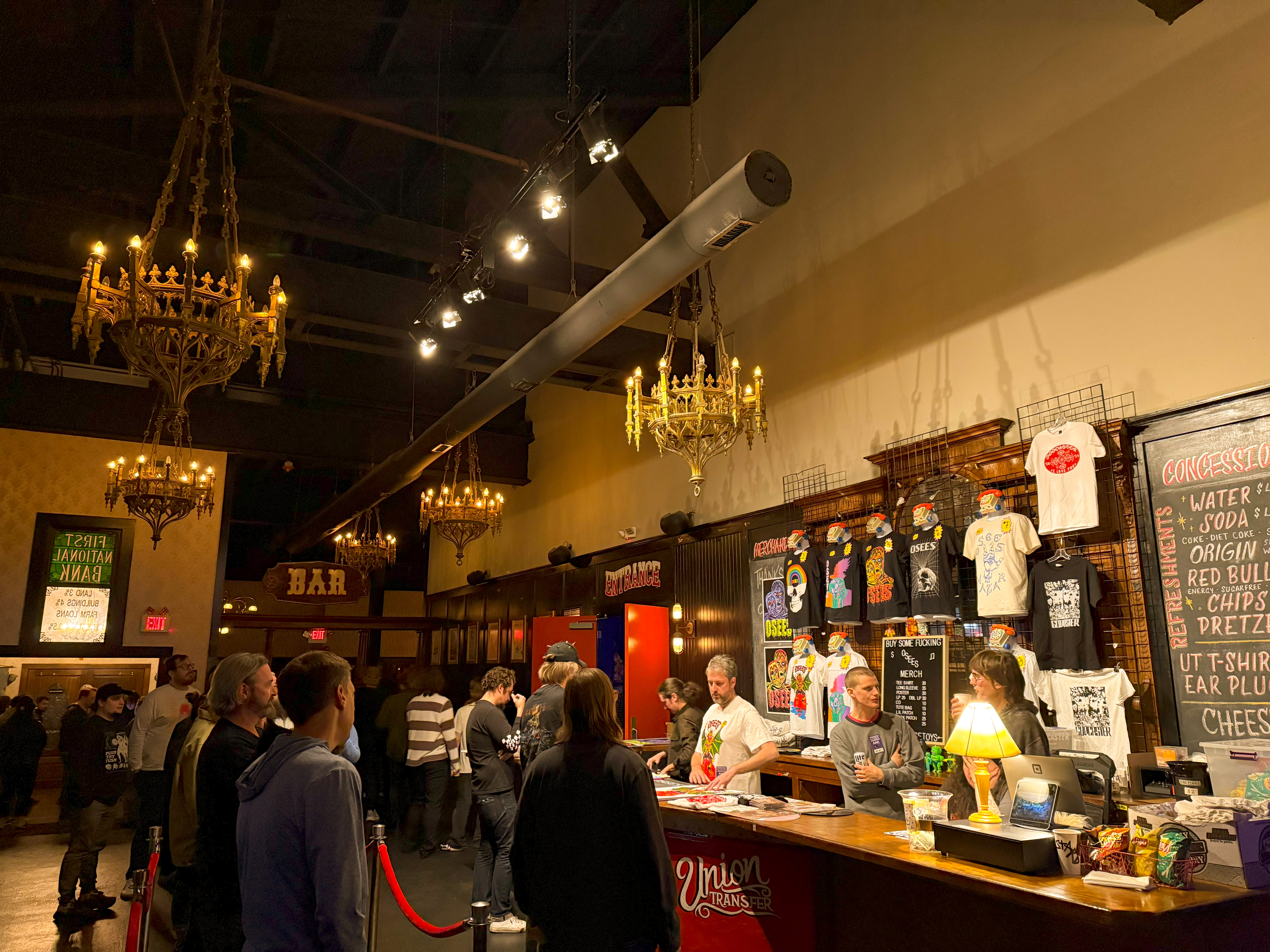
Union Transfer Entrance and Merch Area

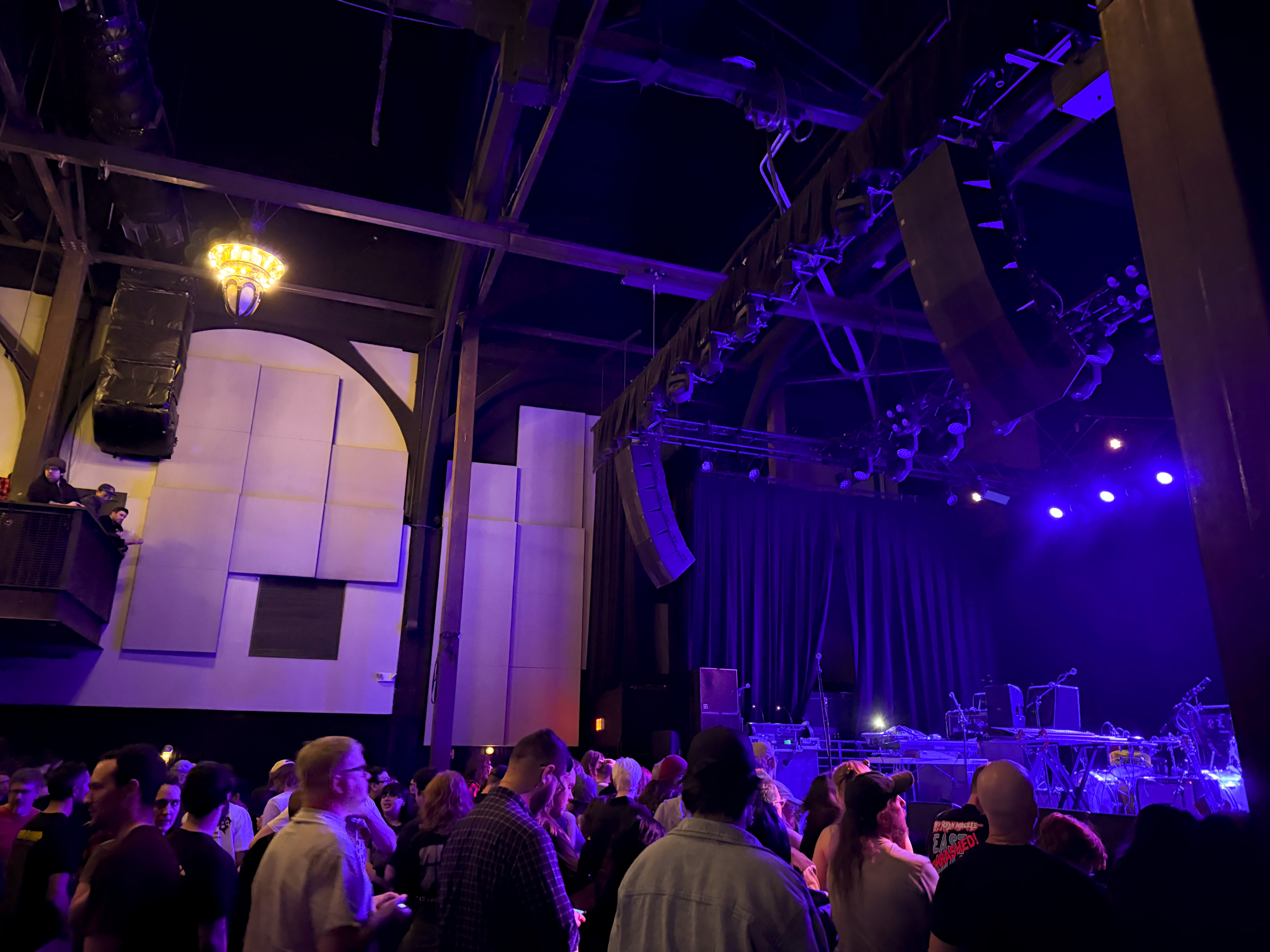
Union Transfer Stage

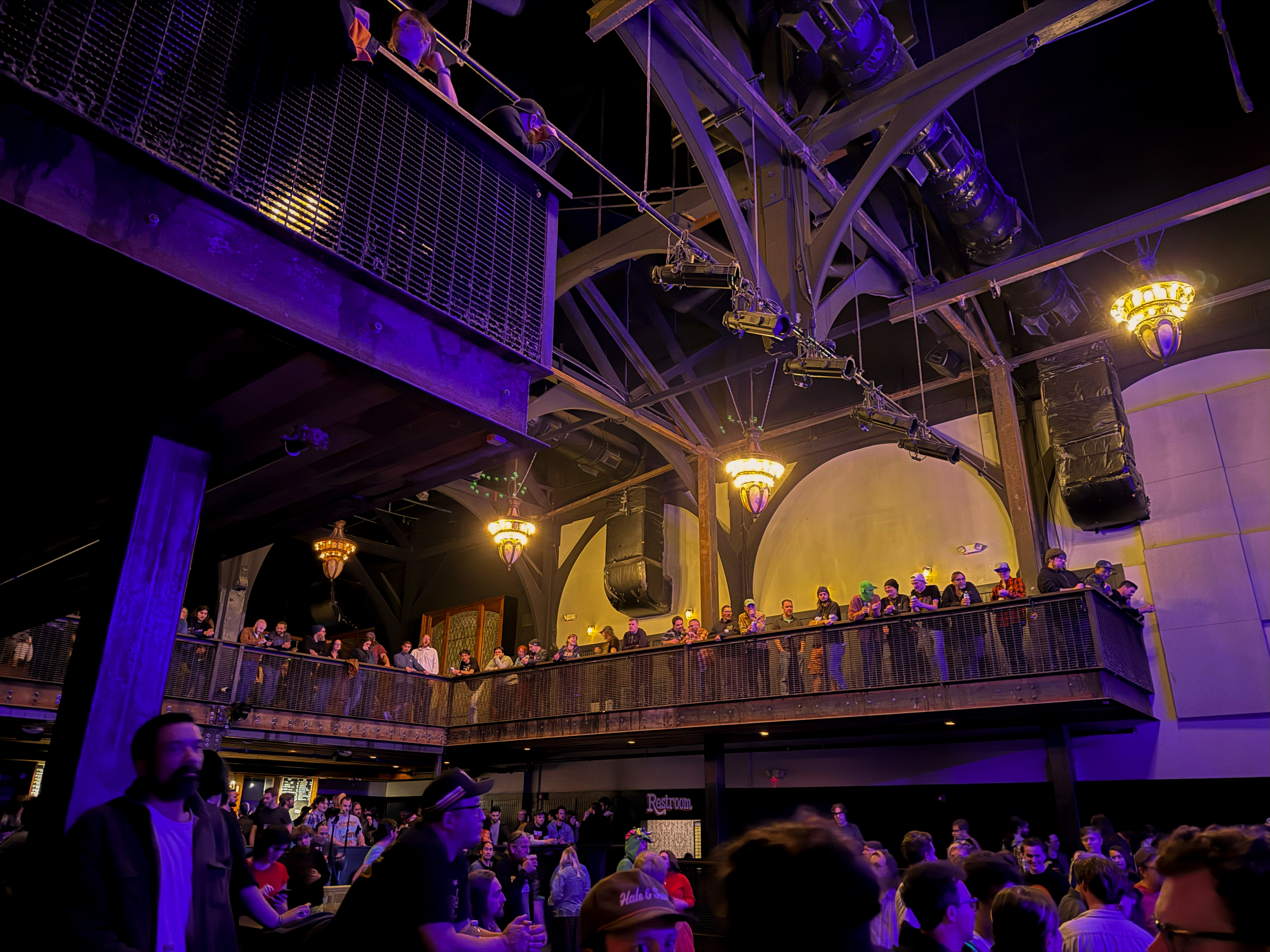
Union Transfer Pit Area

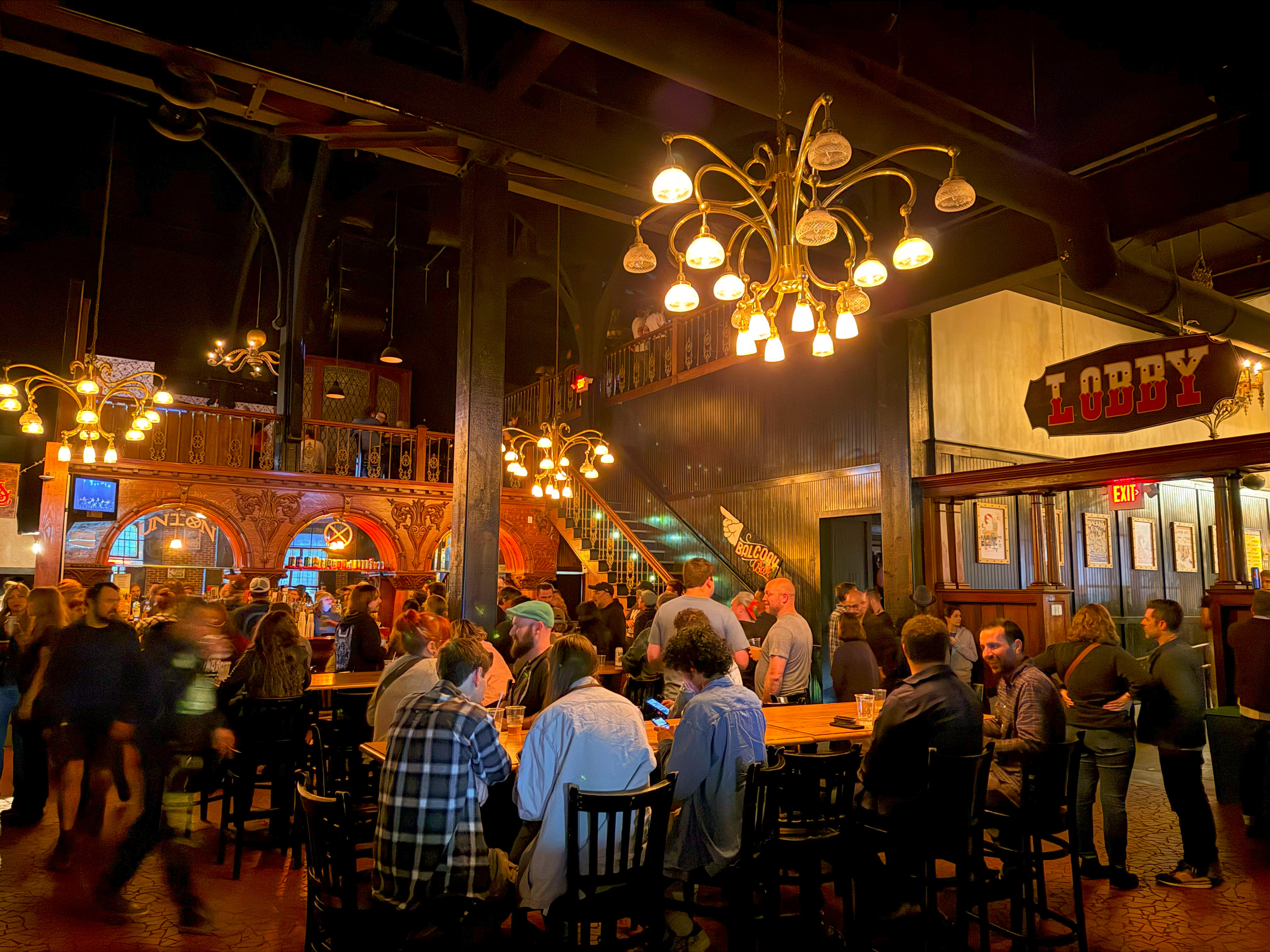
Union Transfer Bar

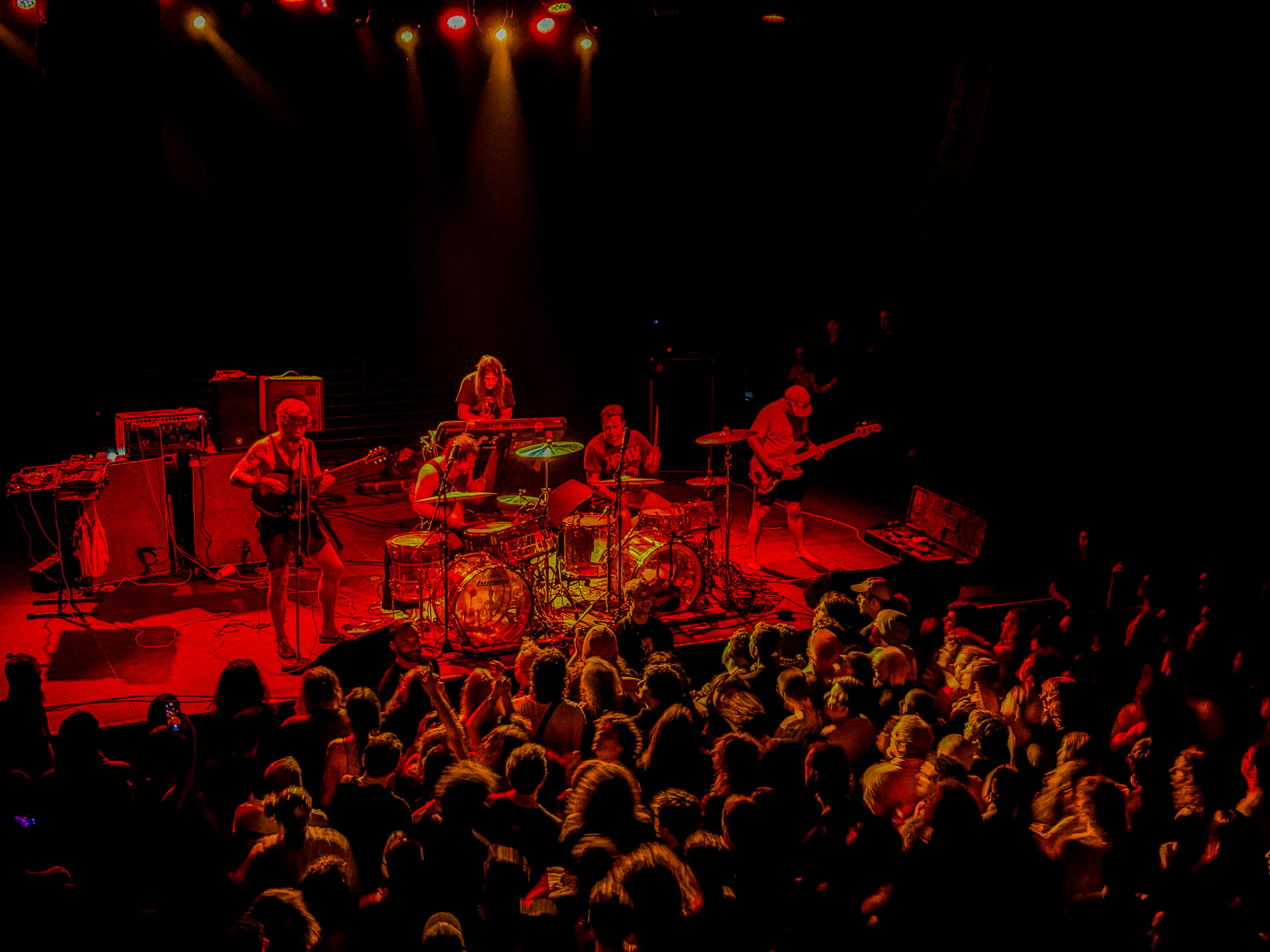
Osees at Union Transfer, October 2024
