= American Nicaraguan Foundation =

- Founded: 1992
- Type: Non-governmental organization
- Purpose: Health and Education
- Location(s): Managua, Nicaragua and Miami, Florida
- Region served: Nicaragua
- Key people: F. Alfredo Pellas, Jr., President and Co-founder
- Revenue: $195,759,013 (2008)

American Nicaraguan Foundation is a not-for-profit organization founded in 1992 to aid impoverished areas of Nicaragua. Projects include strengthening medical assistance, increasing educational attainment, building safe shelters, providing clean water solutions, promoting economic opportunity, and delivering humanitarian aid to impoverished communities all over Nicaragua. The organization utilizes a network of other organizations to deliver aid.
