= List of house organs =

This is a list of house organs.

A house organ (also variously known as an in-house magazine, in-house publication, house journal, shop paper, plant paper, or employee magazine) is a magazine or periodical published by a company for its customers or its employees.

- All a'Board
- American Rifleman
- Among Ourselves
- Amtrak News
- Anglican Journal
- Ariel
- The Bellcord
- Bell Labs Record
- Bell System Technical Journal
- Bus Talk
- Canadian Consulting Engineer
- CRB News
- Disney Magazine
- Dragon
- Dungeon
- Engineers Australia
- Freight Rail & Countrylink Xpress
- The General
- Horizons
- Keeping Track
- LRT News
- LT News
- Main Roads
- Navy News (Australia)
- Navy News (United Kingdom)
- New Zealand Railways Magazine
- Nintendo Power
- On Stage
- Open Road
- Operations
- Presenza
- Queensland Motorist
- The Railwayman
- Railnews
- Rail News
- Road Patrol
- Roads Victoria
- Sea Breezes
- The Signpost
- South African Railways & Harbours Magazine
- State Wide
- Transport News
- TWX
- VicRail News
- Victorian Rail Ways
- Victorian Railways News Letter
- WAGR News Letter
- Westrail News Letter

== Inflight magazines ==
An inflight magazine is a free magazine distributed via the seats of an aeroplane by an airline.

- Above&Beyond
- American Way
- Caribbean Beat
- Celebrated Living
- Cielos Argentinos
- Continental
- EnRoute
- Hana Hou!
- Hemispheres
- Jetstar Magazine
- Scanorama
- SkyMall
- The Australian Way
- Yukon, North of Ordinary
