= List of magazines in Argentina =

Magazines published in Argentina enjoyed higher levels of circulation in the 1990s. However, their sales declined following the economic crisis in 2001. In 2007 there were nearly 600 titles in the country.

The following is an incomplete list of current and defunct magazines published in Argentina. They may be published in Spanish or in other languages.

== A ==
- Aerolineas Argentinas Magazine
- ALMA Magazine
- America y Oriente
- Antena
- Atlántida
- Auto Test

== B ==
- Balam
- Banqueros & Empresarios
- Biliken
- Buenas Ideas

== C ==
- Cabildo
- Caras
- Caras y Caretas
- Cielos Argentinos
- Cocina al Disco de Arado
- Confidentiel
- Convivimos

== D ==
- Dorem Amerike

== E ==
- El Gráfico
- Elle Argentina

== F ==
- Fray Mocho
- El Federal

== G ==
- Gente
- Gente y la actualidad
- El Gráfico
- El Guardián

== H ==
- Hora Cero
- Humor
- Humor Registrado

== I ==
- Imagofagia
- Indie Hoy

== L ==
- L'Officiel Argentina
- Lonely Planet Magazine
- Lúpin

== M ==
- Madhouse
- Martín Fierro (1904–1905)
- Martín Fierro (1924-1927)
- Metal
- Miradas
- Mundo Argentino
- Mundo Nuevo

== N ==
- Naivelt
- Newsweek Argentina
- Newsweek Selecciones
- Nosotros
- Noticias
- La Nueva República

== P ==
- Parsec
- Primera Plana
- Propuesta y control
- Punto de Vista
- Pymes

== R ==
- Rico Tipo
- Riff Raff

== S ==
- Saber Vivir
- Semanario
- Skorpio
- Solosol
- Su Auto
- Sur
- Susana

== T ==
- Tía Vicenta

== V ==
- Veintitrés
- Vida Salvaje

== W ==
- Der Weg

== Z ==
- Zone Magazine

== See also ==
- List of newspapers in Argentina
- Mass media in Argentina
