= Alejandro Agostinelli =

Argentine journalist and writer (born 1963)

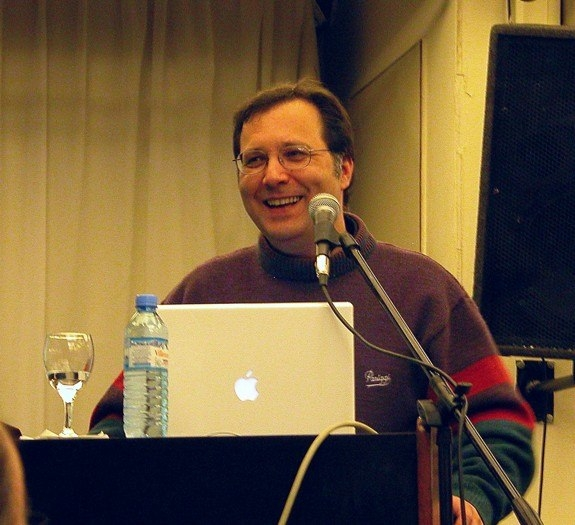
- Alejandro Agostinelli
- Born: Alejandro César Agostinelli; April 29, 1963 (age 63); Buenos Aires, Argentina
- Occupations: Writer, journalist, screenwriter, and TV producer
- Writing career
- Period: 1977–present
- Genre: Journalism

Alejandro César Agostinelli (born April 29, 1963) is an Argentine writer, journalist, screenwriter and TV producer.

== Biography ==
=== Childhood and early youth ===
Son of Mirtha Esther Zamudio —a social psychologist and co-founder of the Escuela de Psicología de Buenos Aires, directed by Alfred Moffat— and of Jorge Agostinelli, Alejandro Agostinelli attended elementary school at the Escuela Normal Nº 10 Luis M. Cullen and highschool at the Colegio Industrial Ingeniero Luis A. Huergo ENET Nº 9.

=== Journalism ===
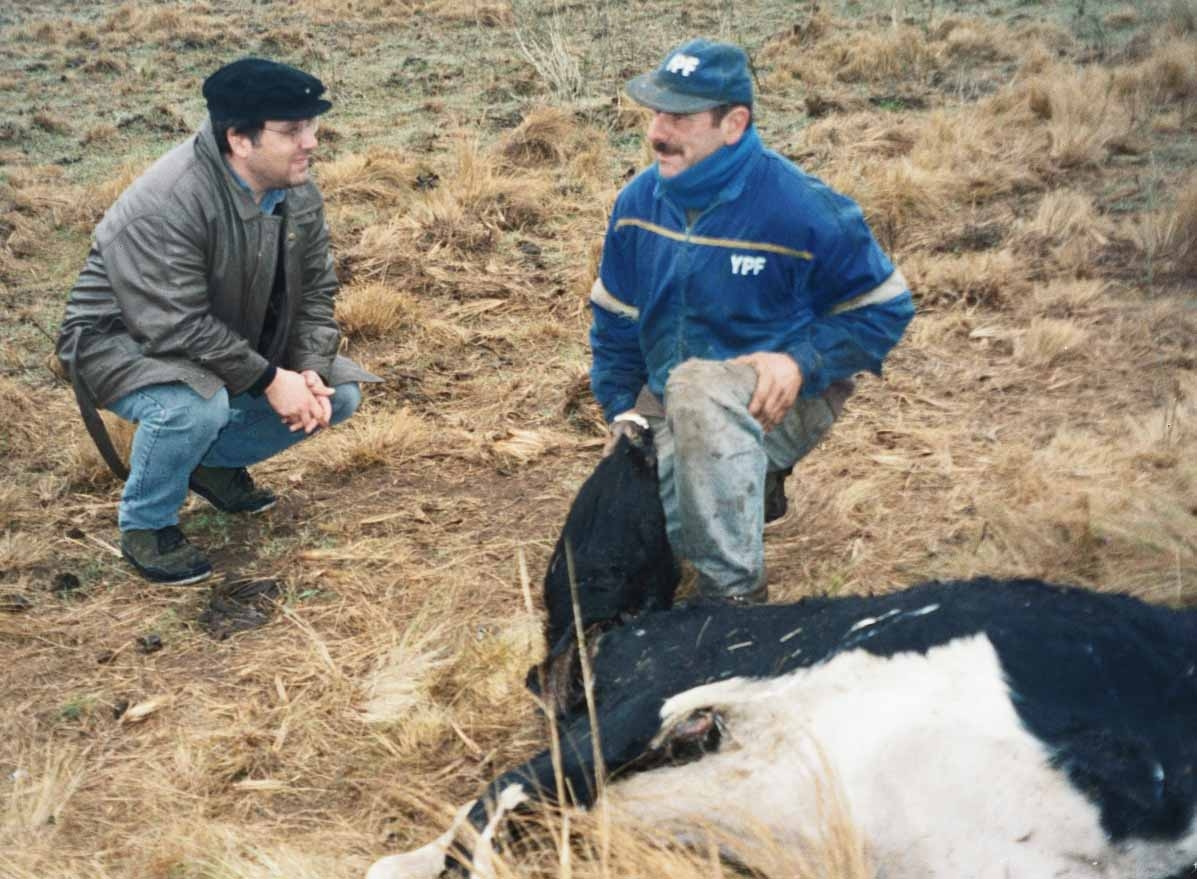
Agostinelli in Anguil, Santa Rosa City, La Pampa Province, during an interview with a rural producer on the outbreak of "cattle mutilations" in 2002.

Agostinelli entered the world of journalism because of an early vocation for scientific heterodoxy, beginning with his interest in UFOs. In 1977, together with a group of fellow students at the Colegio Luis A. Huergo, formed the Grupo Aficionado a la Investigación de Fenómenos Espaciales (Amateur Research Group for Space Phenomena, GAIFE), dedicated to studies of astronomy, astronautics and ufology. In 1979 he wrote and distributed its first publication, the Boletín GAIFE, along with Adrián Legaspi.

In 1980, with Juan Carlos Zabalgoitia, Agostinelli published the newsletter of the Centro de Estudios de Fenómenos Aéreos No Convencionales (Center for the Study of Unconventional Aerial Phenomena, CEFANC), which for its third and final issue was renamed Fenómenos Aéreos (Aerial Phenomena).

In 1982 he began collaborating with William Carlos Roncoroni and Alejandro Enrique Chionetti in writing the Ufo Press magazine, edited by the Comisión de Investigaciones Ufológicas (Commission of UFO Research, CIU), representative in Argentina of the Center for UFO Studies (CUFOS) founded by Dr. Joseph Allen Hynek, until his death in 1986. UFO Press was published until 1987. In December 1982, Agostinelli collaborated with Roncoroni in organizing a massive presentation of Dr. Hynek in the General San Martín Cultural Center of Buenos Aires. That same year, Agostinelli joined the newsroom of the nationwide newspaper La Voz. Starting at the general News Bureau, he was later promoted to the International section of that paper.

A year later he edited together with Aram Aharonian, El País, a version of La Voz made for Córdoba Province, under Dr. Gustavo Roca. He was also a writer for Pueblo de la Nación until that newspaper was terminated, in 1985.

In 1991 he entered the newsroom of the Conocer y Saber magazine (later named Conozca Más). He has also collaborated with the magazines Misterios, Enciclopedia Popular Magazine and Gente, and with the newspapers La Prensa and Página/12. That year he was one of the founders and joined the Directive Committee of the CAIRP Foundation (Argentine Center for the Research and Refutation of Pseudoscience) and was a writer and an advisor for the journal El Ojo Escéptico ("The Skeptical Eye"). He then served as a producer for Channel 9 and América TV of Argentina.

Between 1994 and 1995 he was a writer in the Politics and International sections of the newspaper La Prensa, being a correspondent in the Triple Frontier after the terrorist attack on the AMIA Jewish center. He also covered the Operation Río I against drug trafficking and the Cenepa War between Peru and Ecuador. In the same journal he created and edited the section En Trance.

In 1998 he joined Editorial Perfil as the editorial secretary for the popular science magazine Descubrir. He then was a staff member in the Collectibles and Multimedia areas of Perfil and edited a dozen infomagazines for magazines such as Noticias, Semanario and Caras. He was editorial secretary from the beginning in the magazines El cacerolazo (directed by Andrés Cascioli), Hombre and NEO. At the same time, he wrote for the magazines Rolling Stone and Web! (Argentina), Cuadernos de Ufología, La alternativa racional, Bitniks, Más allá de la Ciencia, Enigmas and Año/Cero (Spain), and Gatopardo (Colombia). Agostinelli also published his work in the American magazines The APRO Bulletin and The Anomalist, the British Flying Saucer Review, the French Lumières Dans la Nuit, Phénomena and VSD, the Italian Giornale dei Misteri and the Brazilian UFO.

After he left Editorial Perfil (2007), Agostinelli wrote for the magazines Pensar, published by the Center for Inquiry (CFI), El Escéptico, Veintitrés, Newsweek Argentina and Bacanal, among others.

He was the creator and editor of the website Dios! (2002–2004), editor of Magia Crítica (2008–2010), a blog that was part of the online edition of the journal Crítica de la Argentina, and wrote for the blog Ciencia Bruja (2011–2013), published by Yahoo! Argentina and replicated in other sites of the company in the Americas. He currently edits the blog factor 302.4 / Factorelblog.com

== Research and controversies ==
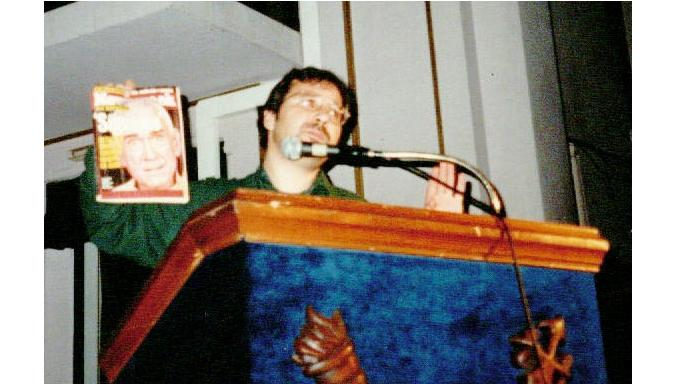
Conference at the University of Santiago de Chile (USACH), 1996.

The enigma of the Uritorco. In January 1986 there was an alleged "UFO landing" on a slope of the Sierras del Pajarillo, near Capilla del Monte, Córdoba Province, Argentina. Agostinelli traveled there, took measures and samples, and found that the alleged evidence of landing, called a "stain", had not been caused "from above" by "an object emitting heat", as stated in an official press release, but that the heat could have ascended from the base of the hill. Agostinelli proposed that the mysterious "stain" could have been caused by a mere fire.

The accusations against Valentina de Andrade. In August 1991 Agostinelli published in Página/12 a story under the title "The Invaders", his first article on the Lineamiento Universal Superior (L.U.S.), an Argentine-Brazilian group led by a couple who claimed to be in contact with extraterrestrials. Two years later, Agostinelli did some self-criticism for having used words such as "brainwashing" and "destructive cult" to refer to the action of new religious movements. "The cults are more religious than they are dangerous", he wrote in the journal La Maga.

Science vs. New Age. In 1992–1993, Futuro, a section in Página/12, reproduced a controversy where representatives of science spoke against and in favor of the New Age movement. The polemic began when, in an October 1992 edition, Futuro published a chapter of the book Strange Weather, by Andrew Ross, a sociologist at Princeton University. Among other things, Ross wrote that skeptic groups were "a symptom of the crisis in scientific rationality and materialism". In 1996, Ross, being an editor for the journal Social Text, approved an article by physicist Alan Sokal that was actually a parody intended to reveal the lack of rigor of postmodernist philosophy. Agostinelli contested that Ross "chooses to embrace the new faces of trickery to express his disbelief in 'rationalist science'". The controversy took eight editions of Futuro, with many academics participating in the debate, including Alejandro Piscitelli, Marina Umaschi, Leonardo Moledo, Denise Najmanovich and Alejandro J. Borgo. The discussion continued in El Ojo Escéptico articles, with opinion pieces by Celso Aldao and Manuel Comesaña, titular professors in the National University of Mar del Plata; Fernando Saraví, associate professor of Biological Physics at the Faculty of Medical Sciences of the National University of Cuyo; and CAIRP methodology consultant, Lic. Daniel De Cinti.

The Roswell "autopsy". In 1995 Agostinelli denounced as a possible fraud Ray Santilli's video of an alleged autopsy of an alien from the Roswell UFO incident. Agostinelli enlisted, on behalf of La Prensa, the help of Diego Licenblat, an expert in special effects, to explain how they could have made the dummy seen in the film, and provided the idea for the program Memoria, which mounted a recreation of the fake autopsy to expose how easy, fast and cheap it was to create that footage.

Sai Baba, a sinner God?. In 2001–2002, Agostinelli produced for Zona de Investigación (a program in Azul TV of Argentina) several controversial reports, being prominent among them the one that addressed the sexual abuse allegations against Indian guru Sathya Sai Baba. The program, divided into two reports issued on August 5 and 12, 2001 under the title "A sinner God?", was an international production that collected testimonies hitherto ignored in Argentina of former followers of Sai Baba. The series presented stories of the experiences of former devotees and counterarguments from devotees. It also included original discoveries.

== TV productions and bibliography ==
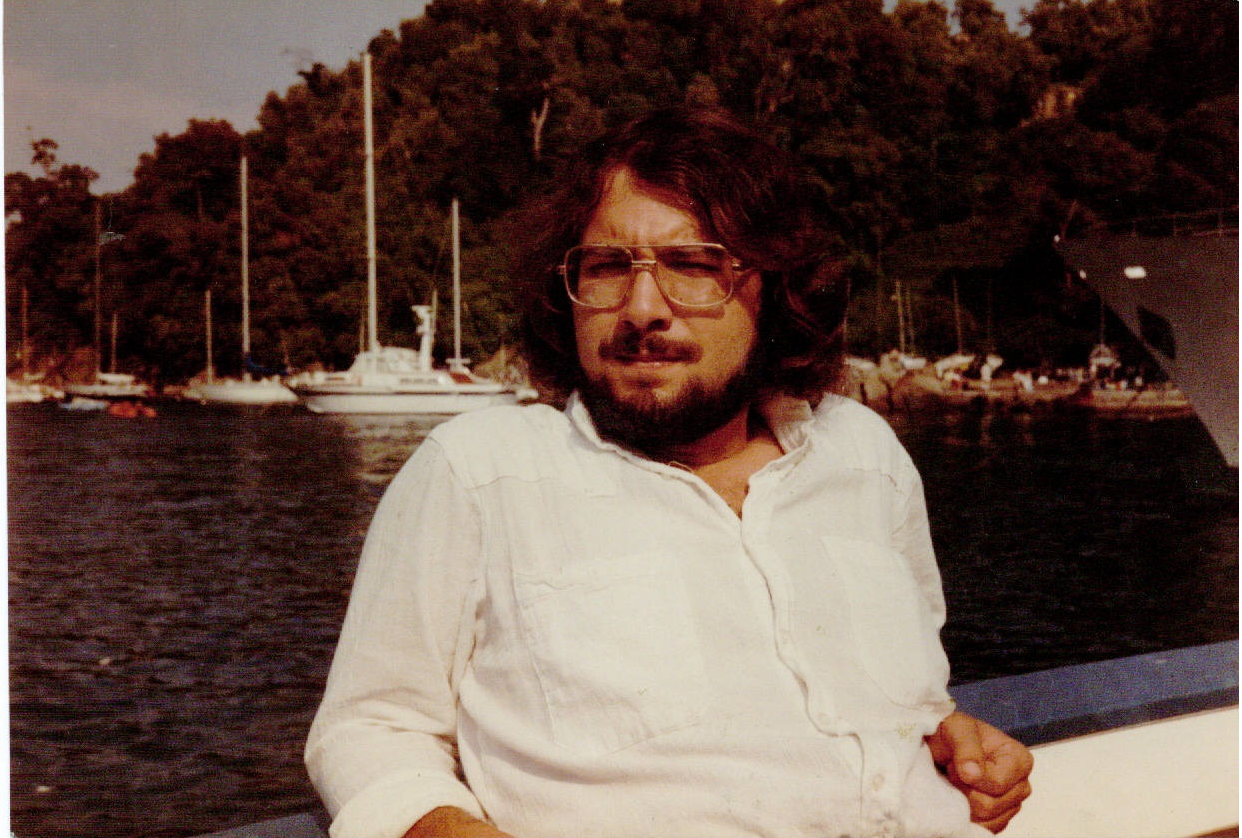

=== Television ===
In 1995, Agostinelli collaborated in the production of Secretos revelados, a documentary program anchored by Dardo Ferrari and broadcast by Argentina Televisora Color (ATC). The following year, he was a produced for the Telenueve research team led by Julio Bertolotti and Rubén Oliva, on Channel 9. In 1997–98 he joined the production teams for the programs Frente a Frente and Por quererte tanto, both in América TV. In 2000–2001 he was a producer for Zona de Investigación, another news show. In 2008–2010 Agostinelli was a producer, consultant and writer for Incoming, a science and technology news broadcast by the Infinito channel. Also, in 2011 he served as a consultant for the documentary series Profecías, by the National Geographic Channel (Snap, 2011). Then in 2012, he was an advisor to TV documentary series Los elegidos, also by the National Geographic Channel (Nippur Media, 2012).

=== Monographs ===
- Coauthor, with Heriberto Janosch, of the Guía de Procedimientos para Recopilar Datos de Experiencias Ovni (CIU, 1988).
- La más completa historia del fenómeno ovni (Colección Conocer y Saber, Ed. Atlántida, 1991).
- El libro secreto de los ovnis (revelaciones de los casos que investigó la USAF), in Conocer y Saber Nº 34 (Ed. Atlántida, Buenos Aires, 1991).
- El caso belga. OVNIS: la historia más apasionante de este siglo, in Conocer y Saber (Ed. Atlántida, Buenos Aires, 1991).
- Coauthor of Diccionario Temático de Ufología (Fundación Anomalía, 1997, 2000).
- Coauthor, with Alejandro Turek, of Terapias Alternativas en el Paciente con Cáncer (pp. 865–879), in Introducción a la Oncología Clínica, Adrián Huñiz, Daniel E. Alonso and Daniel E. Gómez (compilers). Universidad Nacional de Quilmes (2008).

=== Biographies ===
- Fabio Zerpa, in Colección "200 Argentinos", Revista Veintitrés, 2010
- José Ingenieros, in Colección "200 Argentinos", Revista Veintitrés, 2010
- Deodoro Roca, in Colección "200 Argentinos", Revista Veintitrés, 2010
- Mario Bunge, in Colección "200 Argentinos", Revista Veintitrés, 2010

=== Book ===
In 2009, Editorial Sudamericana published Agostinelli's first book, titled Invasores. Historias reales de extratrerrestres en la Argentina ("Invaders. Real stories of extraterrestrials in Argentina").

In Invaders... Agostinelli describes among others the life of contactee Eustaquio Zagorski, translator to an alien language in the mid-sixties; and reveals the biography of brothers Jorge and Napy Duclout, Argentine spiritualists who contacted a "talented engineer" who informed them about life on Ganymede, the largest moon of Jupiter, and who created the first 3D film in Argentina. The book also relates the adventures of contactee Francisco García, who in 1973 announced the landing in Argentina of fifty ships from Mars; presents a profile of the Argentine flying-saucer guru Pedro Romaniuk; and reviews the rumor disguised as news spread in 1968, according to which a "Vidal" couple had been teleported from Chascomús, in Argentina, to Mexico.

Invasores... reconstructs as well the "Peccinetti-Villegas case" the alleged meeting of two casino employees from Mendoza with five humanoid beings who came out of a ship with a screen, in which they showed the men apocalyptic scenes, before leaving an "interplanetary inscription" on the door and stirrups of their car. Agostinelli gets to interview both witnesses, who had not spoken of this experience since 1968.

In another chapter, it tells the story of the guy who gained superpowers after eating from a barbecue made with meat from mutilated cattle, and Agostinelli proposes his own theory, based on the psychology and sociology of rumor, to explain the alleged wave of mutilation of animals registered in Argentina in 2002.

This work also contains the testimony of Mr. Raúl Dorado, a farmer in Jacinto Aráuz, La Pampa Province, whose cellphone was abducted by a UFO, and other persons related to the experience. Invaders... also addresses the secret life of Commander Clomro, a man who claimed to have been assimilated by an extraterrestrial energy. The first part is the story of a poor misunderstood alien being, the second part is that of a repentant man who tells the truth about his identity and the motives that led him to create the character.

The last chapter describes the incredible story of Martha Green, the widow of a soldier enlisted in the Peronist resistance, who had since the mid-fifties a secret romance with a visitor from outer space.
