= Agostinelli =

Agostinelli is an Italian-language patronymic surname. Notable people with the surname include:

- Alejandro Agostinelli (born 1963), Argentine journalist and writer
- Alessandro Agostinelli (born 1965), Italian writer and journalist
- Andrea Agostinelli (born 1957), Italian footballer and coach
- Bruno Agostinelli (1987–2016), Canadian tennis player
- Cataldo Agostinelli (1894–1988), Italian mathematician
- Donatella Agostinelli (born 1974), Italian politician
- Franco Agostinelli (born 1944), Italian prelate
- Massimo Agostinelli (born 1987), Swiss-based Italian American artist
- Nathan Agostinelli (1930–2024), American politician
- Robert Agostinelli (born 1953), American businessman
- Sal Agostinelli (born 1961), American baseball player
