= Hester van Eeghen =

Dutch designer (1958–2021)

Hester van Eeghen (11 November 1958 – 8 April 2021) was a Dutch designer of leather bags, wallets and accessories.

== Life ==
Hester van Eeghen was born in Amsterdam, the youngest of five children. Her family has been involved in the arts in The Netherlands in one way or another since the 17th century. She studied literature at the University of Amsterdam, and soon got involved with theatre, acting, and producing musicals. It was during that time she also started designing bags and working with leather.

She learned the technical craft of leather construction by working with a suitcase designer who encouraged her to perfect the smallest details. She scraped together money to buy small pieces of leather, and created bags, one by one, which she sold in local street markets. With each bag she sold she would buy more leather, make more bags, and so on, until she finally was able to open her shop at 37 Hartenstraat.

== Work ==
Her designs are for sale in over 150 museums and design stores over the world and are sold in several countries like Germany, the UK, Japan and the USA. She is regarded as one of the influential Dutch designers of the 20th century.Here work is listed in an inventory of Dutch Design in the 20th Century (Ton Lauwen 2003).

Van Eeghen has designed collections for other brands such as Paco Rabanne, Marlboro Classics, Jaguar, Castelijn en Berens.

Her work was published in over 200 interviews in magazines (NRC Handelsblad, Volkskrant, International Herald Tribune, San Francisco Chronicle, Trouw, Het Parool, De Telegraaf, Het Financieel Dagblad – HP/De Tijd, Vrij Nederland, Art Aurea, Holland Herald etc..), television and radio.

Simon Schama describes her work as follows: "That instinct for engineering produces beautiful twists, the essence of a great van Eeghen design, driven by the love of morphing loops and mutations. Her imagination turns and turns again, spun by a passion for origami and the Möbius strip. It’s not every designer who will tell you (as she does in a little video about a reversible backpack called 'The Drop') that it was 'inspired by a documentary on spermatozoa'."

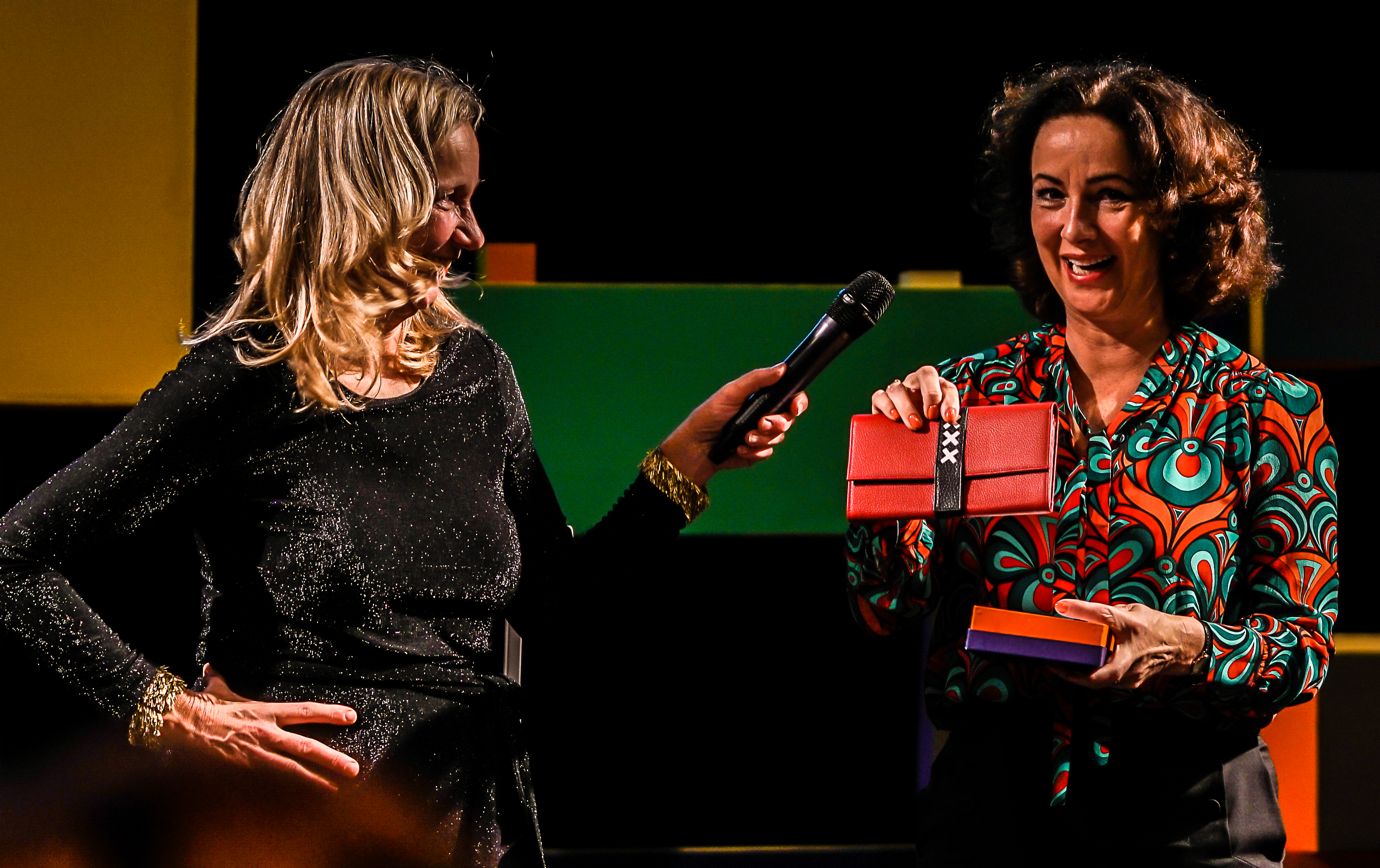
Hester van Eeghen and Femke Halsema

In 2018 to celebrate three decades in design, Hester van Eeghen designed "One Thousand And One Handbags", a pop-up book together with which was launched at the Amsterdam Stedelijk Museum. She imagined an interactive exhibition on the theme of 'the bag as theater', focussed on the owner's experience of touch, smell and their character. In addition an evening was held in the Compagnie Theater with 400 guests, where she directed the performance of a series of theater vignettes representing bag-owning clients, and a ballet with swirling shoes and bags, and presented Mayor Femke Halsema with a set of mayoral bags illustrated with the symbols of the city.

Hester’s work is also part of permanent collections in several museums, including the Amsterdam Museum, The Amsterdam Rijksmuseum and the Cooper Hewitt Smithsonian Design Museum in New York. After her death, NAI010 published "A World of Bags", a monograph providing an overview of some of the more 1000 designs she created, along with a number of articles on her life and sources of inspiration.

== Foundation ==
Both in 1998 and 2008 at the occasion of her first and second decade in design, Hester van Eeghen created a collection of 24 unique pieces that were auctioned at Sotheby's Amsterdam, with the proceeds going to the Foundation Hester van Eeghen Leather Design. Every two years, the Foundation organises a competition in collaboration with the Museum of Bags and Purses as a stimulus for designers who work with leather. The theme of the competition focuses on the historical collection of the museum, for example the 2010 theme is Dine & Date. The winner of the Leather Design Prize will have their design produced in a series of 30 pieces. It is an opportunity for the designer to become familiar with the entire process from design to end product.

In 2008, after 20 years of designing, Hester was made a Knight in the Order of Orange-Nassau and given the decorations by the Mayor of Amsterdam Job Cohen for motivating young designers.
