= Rhapsody (magazine) =

Former inflight magazine for United Airlines

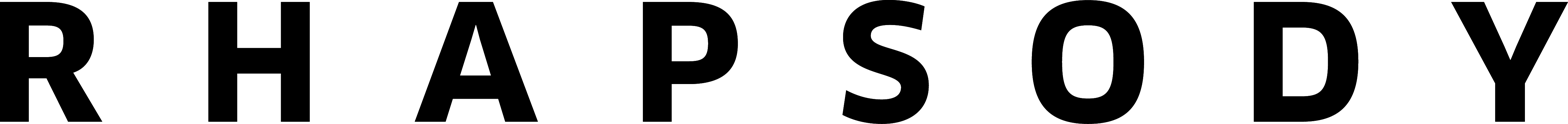
- Categories: Inflight
- Frequency: Monthly
- Circulation: 2 million
- First issue: November 2013
- Final issue: June 2018
- Company: Ink (for United Airlines)
- Based in: Brooklyn, New York
- Language: English
- Website: www.unitedmags.com

Rhapsody was one of United Airlines' monthly in-flight magazines, along with Hemispheres. It was directed toward luxury consumers, being available in United's lounges and first- and business-class cabins. The magazine was published by Ink and headquartered in Brooklyn, New York.

Rhapsody began publishing in November 2013 and was a self-proclaimed "luxury lifestyle and literary magazine." As of 2016, its readers' average net worth was $2,775,000 and household income was $380,700. Typical issues of the magazine contained profiles of celebrities (the main cover feature); coverage of the facets of a luxury lifestyle, such as fine dining, fashion, and hotels; and travel essays and other features, often written by notable writers such as Joyce Carol Oates, Anthony Doerr, Rick Moody, Amy Bloom, and Emma Straub. Monthly readership was about 2 million.

United ceased publication of Rhapsody in June 2018, with the last issue bearing a Summer 2018 date. The airline stated that it planned to incorporate the most popular elements of Rhapsody into its regular inflight magazine Hemispheres.

== Awards ==
- Society of Publication Designers Awards, 2014: Silver Award for Photo Story, "In the Name of the Father"
- Content Marketing Awards, 2014: Gold Award for Best Design - New Publication and Bronze Award for Best New Publication
- Content Council Pearl Awards, 2015: Gold Award for Best Use of Photography
- Eddie and Ozzie Awards, 2016: Best Feature Design - Custom (more than six issues), Best Use of Illustration - Custom, and Best Series of Articles - Custom
