= Celebrated Living =

US magazine for American Airlines

- The cover of the Summer 2006 issue
- Categories: Inflight magazine
- Frequency: Bi-monthly
- Founded: 1999
- First issue: 1 October 1999
- Company: Ink Global
- Country: United States
- Based in: Miami, Florida
- Language: English
- Website: www.celebratedliving.com

Celebrated Living was a free, bi-monthly in-flight magazine available on American Airlines flights in First and Business Class, and in American Airlines Admirals Clubs worldwide.

== History and profile ==
Celebrated Living was established in 1999. The first issue appeared on 1 October of that year. The magazine was published bi-monthly, with issues for January/February, March/April, May/June, July/August, September/October, and November/December, reaching 4.9 million premium class passengers with each issue.

The magazine was published by American Airlines Publishing and is based in Fort Worth, Texas. In 2014, American Airlines appointed Ink as the new publisher of Celebrated Living. The revamped magazine contained new editorial sections focused on luxury, in the form of property, style and culture topics.

Celebrated Living was available to readers both in inflight and in the lounges, via the print version; as well as in digital editions for mobile devices, tablets and online.

By the time American Airlines' other magazine, American Way, ceased publication in 2021, the publication of Celebrated Living had also ended.

== See also ==
- American Way
