= Eminent Distorians =

2024 book by Utpal Kumar

Eminent Distorians: Twists and Truths in Bharat's History is a 2024 book written by Utpal Kumar and published by Ink Publications.The book highlights how Marxist historians have ‘distorted’ the Indian history. The book has received the positive reception.
