= Pacific Steam Navigation Company =

Maritime transport company of the United Kingdom

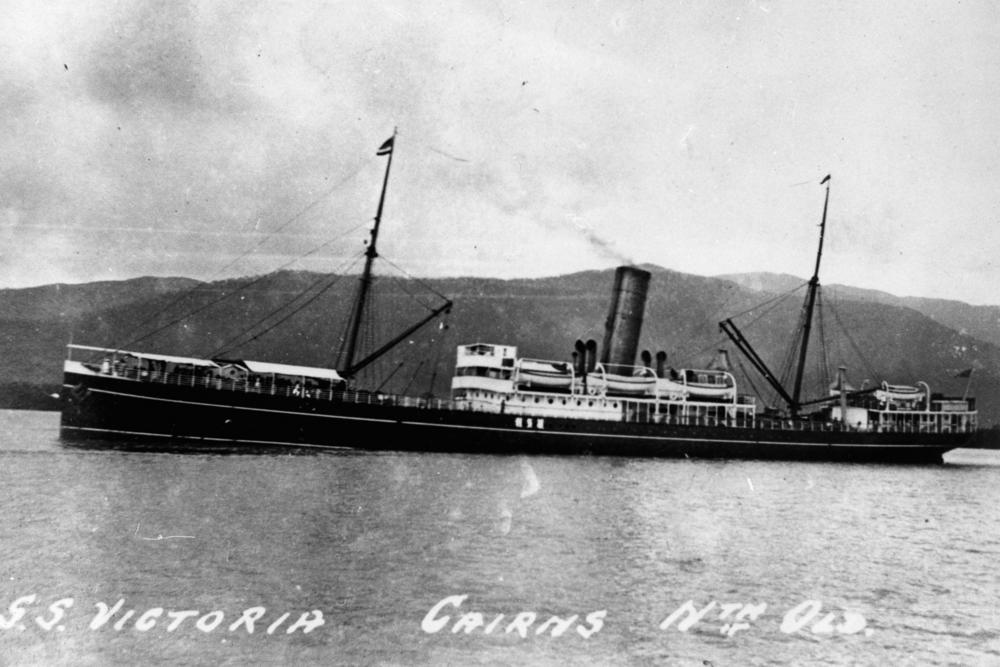
Victoria, built in 1902 and scrapped in 1923

The Pacific Steam Navigation Company (Spanish: Compañía de Vapores del Pacífico) was a British commercial shipping company that operated along the Pacific coast of South America, and was the first to use steam ships for commercial traffic in the Pacific Ocean. At one point in the 1870s, it had the world's largest merchant steamship fleet. The company continued in business until 1965, when it was purchased by another company, but it survived in name through a succession of ownership changes until at least the 1980s.

== History ==
Pacific Steam Navigation Company Act 1878
- Act of Parliament
- Parliament of the United Kingdom
- Long title: An Act to enable the Pacific Steam Navigation Company to reduce their Capital and to invest Moneys; and for other purposes.
- Citation: 41 & 42 Vict. c. li

Dates
- Royal assent: 27 May 1878

Text of statute as originally enacted

House flag used by Pacific Steam Navigation Company

The company was founded by William Wheelwright in London in 1838 and began operations in 1840 when two steam ships Chile and Peru were commissioned to carry mail. Early ports of call were Valparaíso, Coquimbo, Huasco, Copiapó, Cobija, Iquique, Arica, Islay, Pisco and Callao. In 1846 the company expanded its routes to include Huanchaco, Lambayeque, Paita, Guayaquil, Buenaventura and Panama City. The company eventually came to dominate South American shipping routes on the Pacific Coast, driving its competitor, the Panama Railway's Central American Steamship Line, out of business by the late 1860s.

In 1852 the company gained a contract for British Government mail to posts in western South America. Two direct routes were also established – Liverpool to Callao in 1868 and London to Sydney in 1877. In common with its contemporaries, the company lost a number of ships in its early decades. They included Tacna, which exploded in 1874 killing 19 people, and Atacama, which ran aground in 1877 killing 102 people.

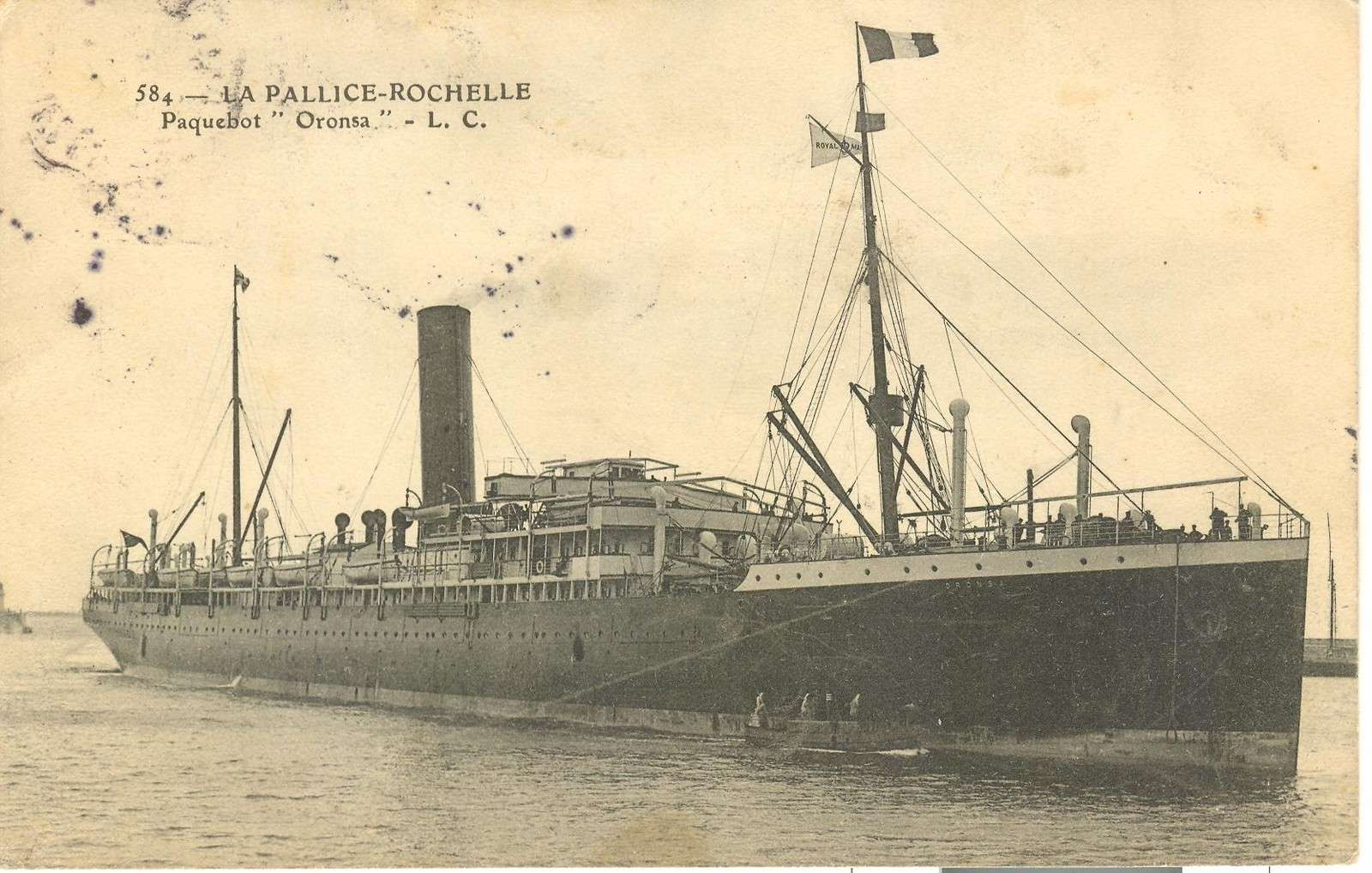
Oronsa, built in 1906 and sunk by U-91 in 1918

In 1905 the company sold its London – Sydney route to the Royal Mail Steam Packet Company, which bought the entire company in 1910. Pacific Steam continued to lose ships at sea. In 1902 Arequipa was wrecked in a gale, killing 63 people. In 1907 Santiago met a similar fate, killing 45 people. In 1911 Taboga ran aground, killing 60 people.

In the First World War ten of the company's ships were sunk, but at the relatively light cost of only 15 lives. In the Second World War a German submarine torpedoed a Pacific Steam passenger liner, Oropesa, sinking her and killing 106 people.

RMSP's name and routes were retained until Furness Withy bought Royal Mail in 1965. Following the purchase the separate Pacific Steam Navigation Company structure was gradually abolished and the vessels sold or rebranded, effectively signalling the end of the company by 1984.

In 1919, the company began a house magazine called Sea Breezes. The journal outlived the company and it still exists, with a focus on international shipping matters.

== Routes ==
Pre-Royal Mail routes
| Years | Type | Principal Route | Ports of call |
|---|---|---|---|
| 1843–1923 | Mail | Chile – Peru | Valparaíso – coastal ports – Callao |
| 1846–1923 | Mail | Chile – Panama | Valparaíso – Callao – Guayaquil – Panama |
| 1848–1923 | Mail | Chile (domestic) | Valparaíso – Puerto Montt (Chile) |
| 1868–1920 | Mail | Europe – Chile | Liverpool – Bordeaux – Lisbon – Cape Verde – Rio de Janeiro – Montevideo – Punta Arenas – Valparaíso (from 1870) – Arica – Mollendo – Callao |
| 1877–1879 | Mail, passengers | Europe- Argentina | Liverpool – Bordeaux – Buenos Aires |
| 1904–1920 | Mail, passengers | Europe – Argentina | Liverpool – La Pallice – Corunna – Vigo – Lisbon – Recife – Salvador – Rio de Janeiro – Montevideo – Buenos Aires – Port Stanley – Punta Arenas – Coronel – Talcahuano – Valparaíso |
| 1914–1945 | Mail | Panama (domestic) | Cristóbal – Panama Canal – Champerico |

== See also ==
- MV Reina del Pacifico
