= Caras (magazine) =

Portuguese language women's magazine in South America and Portugal

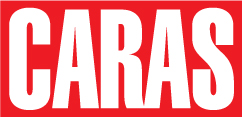

- Cover for the issue dated January 2022, featuring Ricky Martin
- Categories: Women's magazine Celebrity magazine
- Frequency: Weekly
- Circulation: 60,979 (September–October 2013)
- Publisher: Editorial Perfil (Argentina and Uruguay); Edimpresa-Editora Lda (Portugal); Editora Perfil do Brasil (Brazil)
- Founded: 1992; 34 years ago (Argentina); 1993; 33 years ago (Brazil); 1995; 31 years ago (Portugal)
- Company: Editorial Perfil (Argentina); Editora Caras (Brazil); Trust in News (TIN) (Portugal)
- Country: Argentina; Brazil; Portugal; Uruguay
- Based in: Buenos Aires; Rio de Janeiro; Lisbon; Montevideo
- Language: Spanish; Portuguese
- Website: Caras Argentina; Caras Brasil; Caras Portugal; Caras Uruguay

Caras (Spanish and Portuguese: Faces) is a weekly celebrity and women's magazine published in Lisbon, Portugal. The magazine is also distributed in Brazil and Angola and published in Spanish language in Argentina and Uruguay.

== History and profile ==
Caras was established in Argentina on 24 November 1992 by Editorial Perfil and launched in Portugal in 1995. The magazine was part of the Portuguese conglomerate Impresa Group, which also controlled the weekly newspaper Expresso and news magazine Visão. In 2018, Portuguese company Trust in News (TIN) acquired the magazine. The publisher of the magazine, based in Lisbon, was Edimpresa-Editora Lda, a subsidiary of the Swiss publishing company Edipresse.

Caras provides weekly news on the private lives of the public figures both from Portugal and from other countries and news about fashion, beauty, health, cuisine and decoration. The magazine has been distributed weekly in Angola since September 2005.

In 2014 Caras was the recipient of the Meios and Publicidade award in the category of society publication.

From 1988 to 2019 an edition of Caras was published in Chile by Editorial Televisa.

== Circulation ==
In 2007 Caras had a circulation of 91,000 copies. The circulation of the weekly was 88,691 copies from February 2008 to February 2009. Its circulation was 60,979 copies between September and October 2013.

== Channel TV ==
On March 4, 2024, the Argentine magazine was launched as Caras TV on channel 21.1 of digital terrestrial television in Argentina.

== See also ==
- List of magazines in Argentina
