= Parsec (disambiguation) =

A parsec is a unit of distance.

Parsec may also refer to:

== Computing ==
- PARSEC, a software package designed to perform electronic structure calculations of solids and molecules
- Parsec (parser), a Parser combinator library for Haskell
- Parsec (software), a desktop capturing application
- Princeton Application Repository for Shared-Memory Computers
- Convex Computer, originally named Parsec
- A parallel simulation language used in GloMoSim
- A rack extension from Propellerhead Software

== Other uses ==
- Parsec (magazine), an Argentine sci-fi magazine
- Parsec (video game), a 1982 video game for the TI-99/4A
- Parsec Awards, a set of awards for science fiction podcasts
- "Parsec", a song by Stereolab from Dots and Loops
- Parsecs, some levels in the video game Gaplus

== See also ==
- PARSEC47, a scrolling shooter video game
