= Bookmark Content and Communications =

International content marketing agency, member of Spafax Group

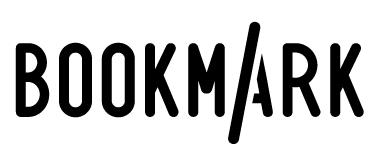
- Formerly: Spafax Canada and Forward Worldwide
- Industry: Marketing, public relations, advertising
- Founded: 1985; 41 years ago
- Headquarters: London, Toronto
- Key people: Simon Hobbs CEO, Raymond Girard, Chief Client Officer
- Parent: WPP plc
- Website: bookmarkcontent.com

Bookmark Content and Communications, sometimes shortened to Bookmark or Bookmark Content, is an international content marketing and communications agency. It is a member of the Spafax Group, a WPP company. It was rebranded in 2016 after the merger of Spafax Content Marketing and Forward Worldwide and operates out of nine cities in North and South America, Europe and Asia. Bookmark specializes in content marketing, digital marketing, public relations, CRM, social media, magazine publishing and media sales. The company serves a number of major clients in industries including luxury, travel and hospitality, finance, real estate, automotive, beauty, and retail.

== History ==
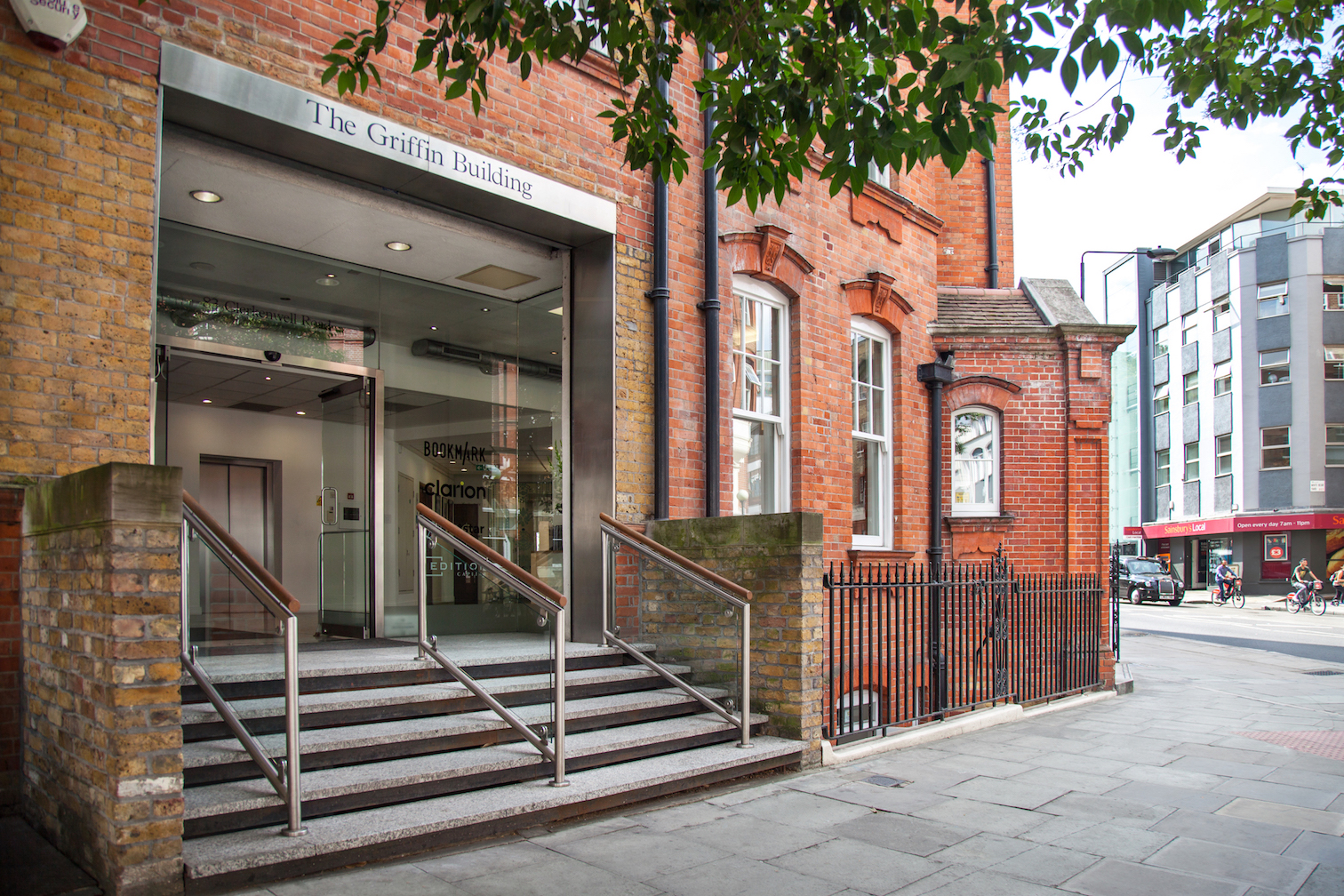
The main entrance of Bookmark's current London offices.

=== Origins of Spafax (1930s-2000s) ===
Spafax traces its origins to the 1930s, originally founded as Bath Spa Factors in Bath, England and providing garage services to Rolls-Royce and Bentley vehicles. Bath Spa Factors shifted into the film industry, forming Spafax Television, offering services to a client base including Reuters and Marconi.

In 1986, Duncan Hilleary, one of Spafax's earliest contributors, worked with filmmaker Jeremy Hunter to produce content for British Airways as Spafax Group. This led to contracts with other airlines, including Singapore and Northwest. Spafax continued to provide services to airlines and began servicing more clients in different fields over time.

In 1993, Hilleary re-launched British Airways’ in-flight entertainment with a new programming strategy, a new graphic identity and media brand. Spafax provided services for all aspects of British Airways’ in-flight passenger "audio-visual experience". From 1995 to 2004, Spafax expanded to Canada, Asia, South America, and the UAE.

=== Origins of Forward Worldwide (1986-2000s) ===
In 1986, Forward Publishing was established by William Sieghart and Neil Mendoza to create magazines for brands that would rival newsstand titles. The first office was the upper floor of a terraced house in Great Pulteney Street in Soho, London, designed by the architect Sophie Hicks. M & C Saatchi were early investors via its affiliate Megalomedia, the company also formed a strategic alliance with Condé Nast to develop titles for luxury brands.

Forward was sold to WPP in 2001. William Sieghart founded the Forward Prizes for Poetry, as well as StreetSmart, an innovative charity to help the local homeless. Both non-profit ventures were run alongside the commercial business. Clients at this time included IBM, Xerox, British Airways, BT, Halifax, Midland Bank Patek Philippe, Tesco, Lexus, Nasdaq, NCR and The Body Shop.

From 2001 the business stepped up its transformation into a digital agency with print still a core offering. Digital strategy, analytics, paid media and digital development were included in a full-service offering to a client list including Barclays, Standard Life, B&Q, Ford, Bang & Olufsen, Fidelity and Aberdeen Standard Capital. The advertising department also expanded to include multi-channel content solutions.

=== Merger (2016) ===
In 2016, Spafax Content Marketing and Forward Worldwide, both content marketing companies, merged to become Bookmark Content and Communications, under the Spafax Group, headed by CEO Niall McBain.

The merger of Spafax Content Marketing and Forward created a new global content marketing and PR agency, with co-CEOs Raymond Girard and Simon Hobbs. The decision to rebrand was based on an intention to avoid market confusion between the firms post-merger. The new company was formally launched October 8, 2016 in New York at Eleven Madison Park.

=== Independence and current work (2016-present) ===
Bookmark currently exists as a member of the Spafax Group, a WPP company. The company operates out of nine offices in seven countries, including offices in the cities of Lima, London, Los Angeles, Montreal, New York, Santiago, Shanghai, Singapore and Toronto. The company employs more than 200 specialists in content marketing, PR, and media sales.

Since the merger, Bookmark has worked on several print, digital, and PR projects including Air Canada enRoute in-flight publications for Air Canada on topics ranging from restaurants to fashion, a biannual magazine for Patek Philippe, the Earn Your Wings gamified loyalty platform for Air Canada, the Tesco Baby Club content program, and an experiential campaign in a Toronto streetcar for the launch of Pandora Garden. Other major projects include content production for the StreetSmart Foundation, which raises money for homelessness charities and social media management for Hudson Yards through Related Companies. Bookmark also produces Air Canada's Top 10 list of Canada's Best New Restaurants annually.

== See also ==
- Spafax
- WPP group
