= NGC 4666 =

Spiral galaxy in the constellation Virgo

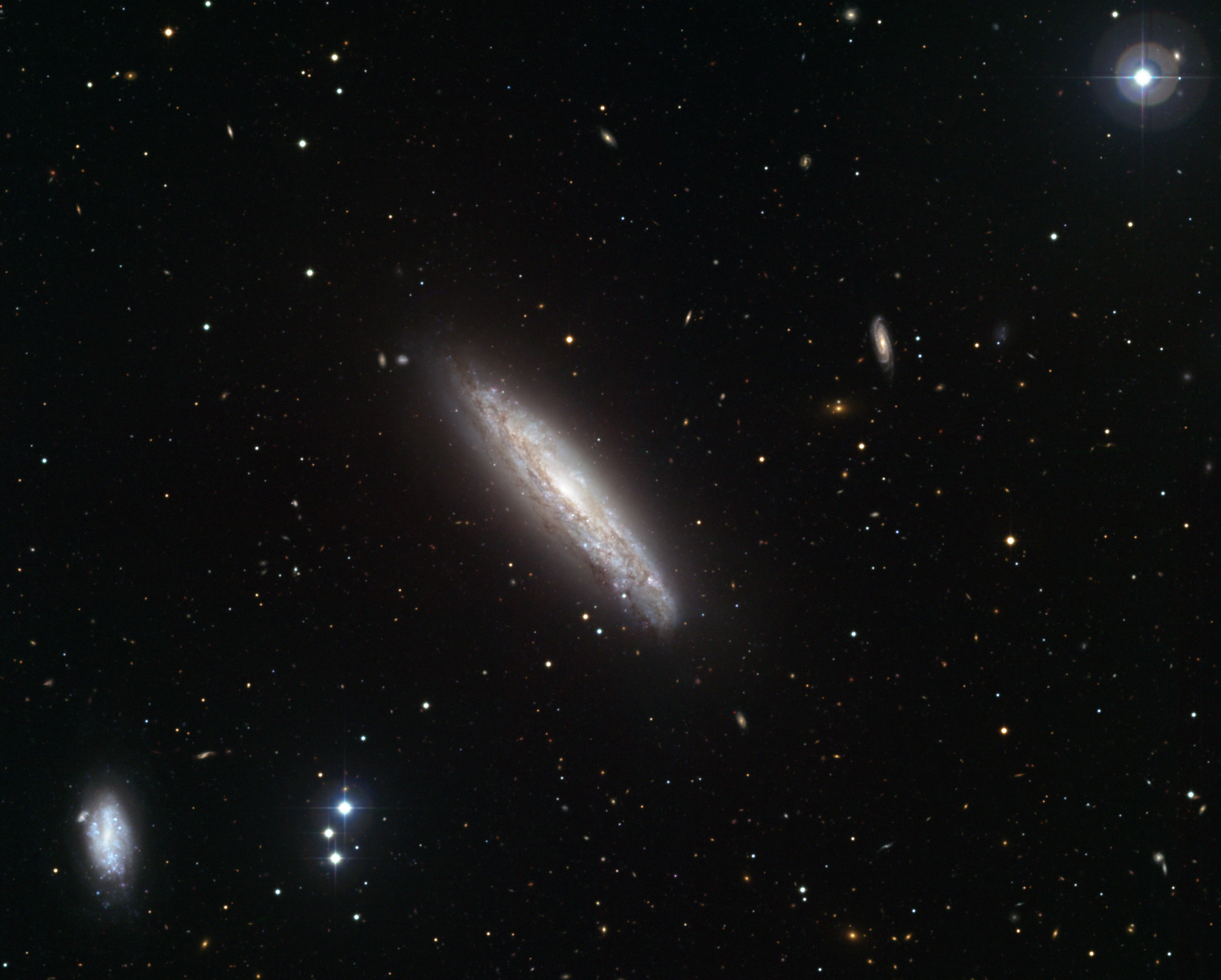
- The superwind galaxy NGC 4666

Observation data (J2000 epoch)
- Constellation: Virgo
- Right ascension: 12^{h} 45^{m} 08.676^{s}
- Declination: −00° 27′ 42.88″
- Heliocentric radial velocity: 1,517 km/s
- Distance: 54.89 ± 0.65 Mly (16.83 ± 0.20 Mpc)
- Apparent magnitude (V): 10.8

Characteristics
- Type: SABc
- Size: 115,730 ly (35.50 kpc) (diameter; D_{25} isophote)
- Apparent size (V): 4.6′ × 1.3′
- Notable features: Starburst

Other designations
- PMN J1245-0027, UZC J124508.0-002744, IRAS F12425-0011, NGC 4666, UGC 7926, MCG +00-33-008, PGC 42975

NGC 4666 is a barred spiral galaxy in the equatorial constellation of Virgo. It was discovered by the German-born English astronomer William Herschel on February 22, 1784. John L. E. Dreyer described it as "bright, very large, much extended 45°±, pretty suddenly brighter middle". It has an apparent visual magnitude of 10.8 and spans an angular size of 4.6′ × 1.3′.

NGC 4666 is located at a distance of approximately 55 million light-years from the Milky Way, where it is a member of the Virgo II Groups, a series of galaxies and galaxy clusters strung out from the southern edge of the Virgo Supercluster. It is a member of an interacting system with NGC 4668 and a dwarf galaxy, and belongs to a small group that also includes NGC 4632, known as the NGC 4666 Group.

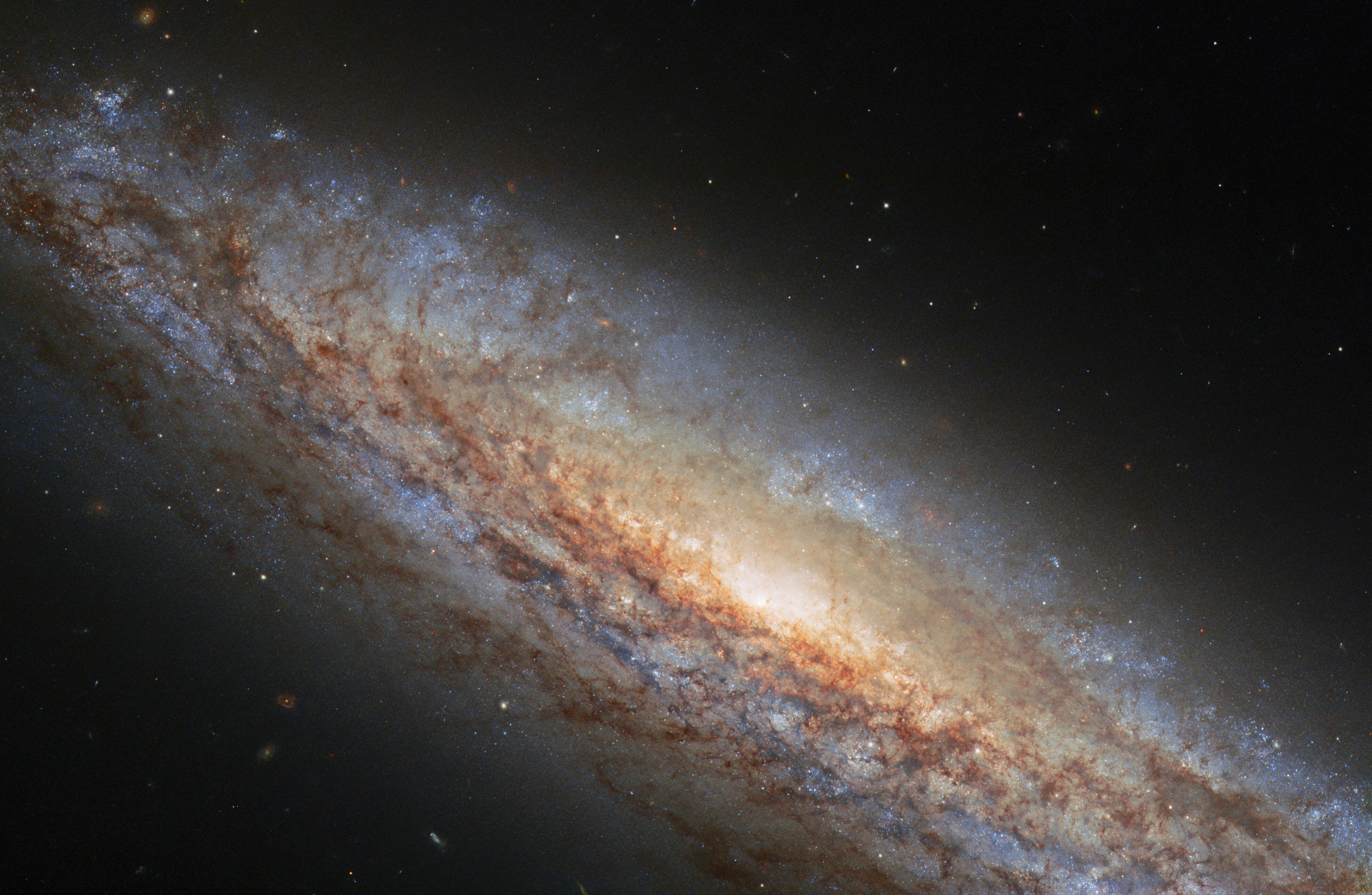
Enlarged view of the center of NGC 4666 by the Hubble Space Telescope

The morphological classification of this galaxy is SABc, which indicates a weak bar around the nucleus with moderately wound spiral arms. Viewed nearly edge-on, its galactic plane is inclined at an angle of 85°±2° to the line of sight from the Earth, with the major axis aligned along a position angle of 40°. There is an active galactic nucleus that shows a modest level of activity and is most likely heavily obscured by gas and dust. The central point source has been detected in the radio and X-ray bands.

This is a starburst galaxy that is noteworthy for its vigorous star formation, which creates an unusual superwind of out-flowing gas. This wind is not visible at optical wavelengths, but is prominent in X-rays, and has been observed by the ESA XMM-Newton space telescope. The estimated star formation rate is 7.3 M_{☉} yr^{−1}, with a density of 8.9×10^{−3} M_{☉} yr^{−1} kpc^{−2}. Unlike in many other starburst galaxies, the star formation is spread across the disk rather than being more concentrated.

== Supernovae ==
Three supernovae have been observed in NGC 4666:

- SN 1965H (Type IIP, mag. 14) was discovered by Enrique Chavira on 23 May 1965.
- ASASSN-14lp (Type Ia, mag. 14.3) was discovered by ASAS-SN on 9 December 2014; it was located 12″ from the center of the galaxy.
- SN 2019yvr (Type Ib, mag. 15.882) was discovered by ATLAS on 27 December 2019. It has a 0.005 redshift. Images of the location of the supernova before the explosion showed the progenitor star was ~19M_{☉}.

== See also ==
- List of NGC objects (4001–5000)
