= TWX =

TWX may refer to:

- Teletypewriter Exchange Service, a telex system in the US and Canada
- TWX (magazine)
- Time Warner's NYSE ticker symbol from 1990 to 2018
