= EnRoute (magazine) =

Canadian in-flight magazine and entertainment system

enRoute was the in-flight magazine and entertainment system of Air Canada. All content in the print magazine, as well as the website, was published in both French and English by Spafax. The magazine had offices in both Montreal, Quebec and Toronto, Ontario.

== Distribution ==
The magazine was offered for free on all Air Canada aircraft and in its Maple Leaf Lounges, as well as on their website. The publisher of the magazine was Spafax Canada Inc. As well as the magazine, enRoute is the name given to Air Canada's in-flight entertainment programme of movies, television, radio and short films, available on most flights.

== History ==
Sydney Loney was the Executive Editor from August 2019 until August 2020 when she became the editor-in-chief. In the past, Ilana Weitzman served as the editor-in-chief of the magazine until July 2015 when she was replaced by Jean-François Légaré. Nathalie Cusson served as Art Director from 2010 to 2014. Stefanie Sosiak served as Art Director from 2015 to 2022. Michael Tong serves as Senior Art Direct from 2023-2025.

The print magazine was discontinued following the November, 2024 issue. Its online edition continues to publish the Canada’s Best New Restaurants awards but not the former magazine's other content.

== Social media ==
enRoute Magazine has accounts on Twitter, Instagram, Facebook, YouTube, Pinterest and Tiktok.

== Awards ==
In 2020, enRoute Magazine won 4 Golds and 2 Bronzes at the 29th annual NATJA Awards, including top honours for best Travel Magazine for the September 2020 Food Issue. In May 2012 cnn.com named it as the best inflight magazine worldwide. In 2009, enRoute won 10 awards at the Canadian National Magazine Awards.

== Canada's Best New Restaurants ==
Canada's Best New Restaurants is an annual program run by enRoute Magazine, and has been featured in a dedicated Food Issue every year since 2002. The program consists of travelling across Canada, trying new restaurants in each province and eventually ranking a top 10, to promote and support Canada's culinary talent.
