= SAS Media =

SAS Media, owned by the SAS Group, is the publisher of the inflight magazines: Scanorama (English, Japanese and Mandarin), SAS Braathens magasinet, Seasons (for EuroBonus members), Perspektiv (Wideroe) and the folder 'Menu and More' (Scandinavian Airlines). SAS Media hands out two awards: Scandinavian of the year and the Scanorama award. SAS Media was founded in 1972 and have 40 employees today. In April 2008 SAS Media was sold to the Danish company Datagraf and renamed DG Communication AB
