= Continental (magazine) =

Magazine

Continental was the quarterly in-flight magazine for Continental Airlines. The magazine was previously published on monthly basis. The Pohly Company, a Boston-based customer communications company, was the long-term publisher. It was read by approximately 55 million passengers a year. On May 2, 2010, Continental agreed to a merger with United Airlines. Subsequently, Continental flights now issue the Hemispheres magazine.
