= Ly =

LY or ly may refer to:

== Businesses ==
- El Al (IATA airline designator LY)
- LY Corporation, Japanese company former Z Holdings

== Government and politics ==
- Libya (ISO 3166-1 country code LY)
- Lý dynasty, a Vietnamese dynasty
- Labour Youth of Ireland
- Legislative Yuan, the unicameral legislature of the Republic of China (Taiwan)

== Language ==
- -ly, an adjectival and adverbial suffix in English
- Hungarian ly, or elipszilon, a digraph in the Hungarian alphabet

== Science and technology ==
- .ly, the Top-level domain for Libya
- .ly, the default filetype extension of the GNU LilyPond sheet music format
- Light-year, the distance that light travels in one year in a vacuum
- Langley (unit), a unit of energy distribution over a given area

== Other uses ==
- Lý (Vietnamese surname), a Vietnamese surname
- Ly the Fairy, a character from Rayman 2: The Great Escape

== See also ==
- Light year (disambiguation)
- YL (disambiguation)
