= American Way (magazine) =

Inflight magazine, published 1966–2021

- The cover of the July 2016 issue featuring Demi Lovato
- Categories: Inflight magazine
- Frequency: Monthly
- Founded: 1966
- Final issue: June 2021
- Company: Ink Global
- Country: United States
- Based in: Dallas
- Language: English
- Website: americanway.com
- ISSN: 0003-1518

American Way was a free, inflight magazine available across the entire American Airlines fleet and in Admirals Clubs premium lounges. The magazine was first published in 1966 and was released monthly, reached over 16 million passengers every month.

In 2014, American Airlines appointed Ink as the new publisher of American Way. Ink's first issue launched in January 2015, featuring a double cover edition with rock star David Grohl and the band Foo Fighters. This issue introduced a fresh design and an editorial mix of international celebrities, world-class destinations, and extraordinary stories. However, in June 2021, American Way ceased publication.

== See also ==
- Celebrated Living
