= Newsweek Selecciones =

Argentine weekly magazine

Newsweek Selecciones was an Argentine weekly magazine, a local edition of Newsweek. It used material from Newsweek En Español and Newsweek Argentina (part of the articles are written by the Argentine bureau located in Buenos Aires, and part is a reproduction of international material). Its editorial director was Alex Milberg.

It started in 2010, and belonged to Sergio Szpolski's media group.

== Staff ==
- Damián Cotarelo, general coordinator

== Sections ==
- World Vision
- Panorama
- Last Word
