= NGC 4632 =

Galaxy in the constellation Virgo

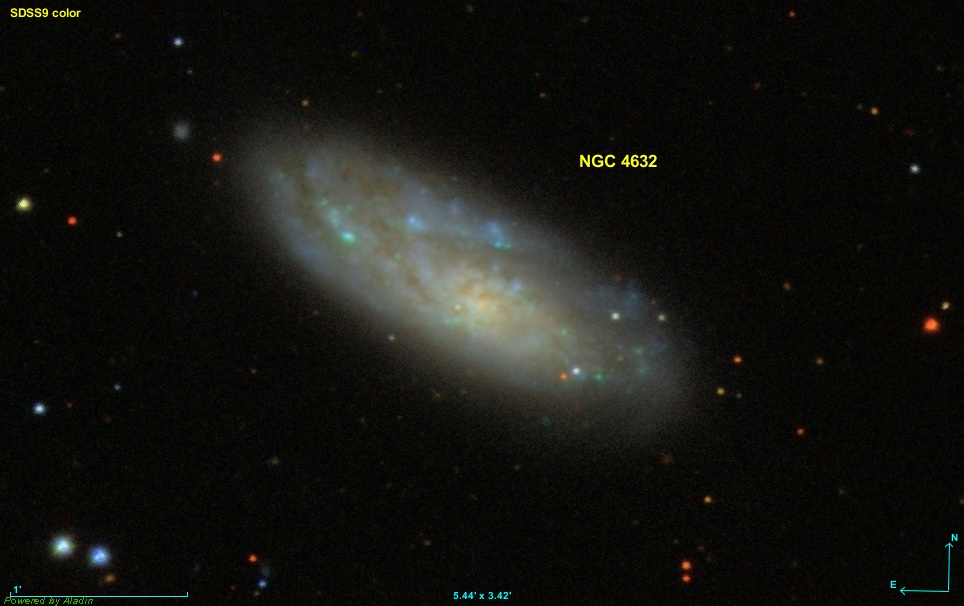
- NGC 4632 imaged by SDSS

Observation data (J2000 epoch)
- Constellation: Virgo
- Right ascension: 12^{h} 42^{m} 31.9896^{s}
- Declination: −00° 04′ 57.684″
- Redshift: 0.005741
- Heliocentric radial velocity: 1,721±2 km/s
- Distance: 99.2 ± 7.0 Mly (30.40 ± 2.16 Mpc)
- Group or cluster: NGC 4666 Group (LGG 299)
- Apparent magnitude (V): 11.7

Characteristics
- Type: SAc
- Size: ~50,400 ly (15.45 kpc) (estimated)
- Apparent size (V): 3.0′ × 1.2′

Other designations
- IRAS 12399+0011, UGC 7870, MCG +00-32-038, PGC 42689, CGCG 014-110

NGC 4632 is a spiral galaxy in the constellation of Virgo. Its velocity with respect to the cosmic microwave background for is 2,061±24 km/s, which corresponds to a Hubble distance of 99.2 ± 7.0 Mly (30.40 ± 2.16 Mpc). However, 15 non-redshift measurements give a much closer distance of 54.12 ± 3.04 Mly (16.593 ± 0.931 Mpc). It was discovered by German-British astronomer William Herschel on 22 February 1784.

== Polar Ringed Galaxy ==
It was discovered in 2023 that the galaxies NGC 4632 and NGC 6156 are surrounded by a disk of cold hydrogen orbiting 90 degrees around their disks. These are the very first polar-ringed galaxies discovered through radio wave observations. These observations were made as part of the WALLABY astronomical survey.

== NGC 4666 Group ==
According to A. M. Garcia, NGC 4632 is a member of the NGC 4666 Group (also known as LGG 299). This group has 3 members, including NGC 4666 and NGC 4668.

== Supernova ==
One supernova has been observed in NGC 4632:

- SN 1946B (Type II, mag. 15.7) was discovered by Edwin Hubble in May, 1946.

== See also ==
- List of NGC objects (4001–5000)
