= Wings of China =

Chinese inflight magazine

- Categories: Inflight magazine
- Frequency: Monthly
- Publisher: Cinmedia
- Founded: 1992
- Country: China
- Based in: Beijing
- Language: Chinese; English

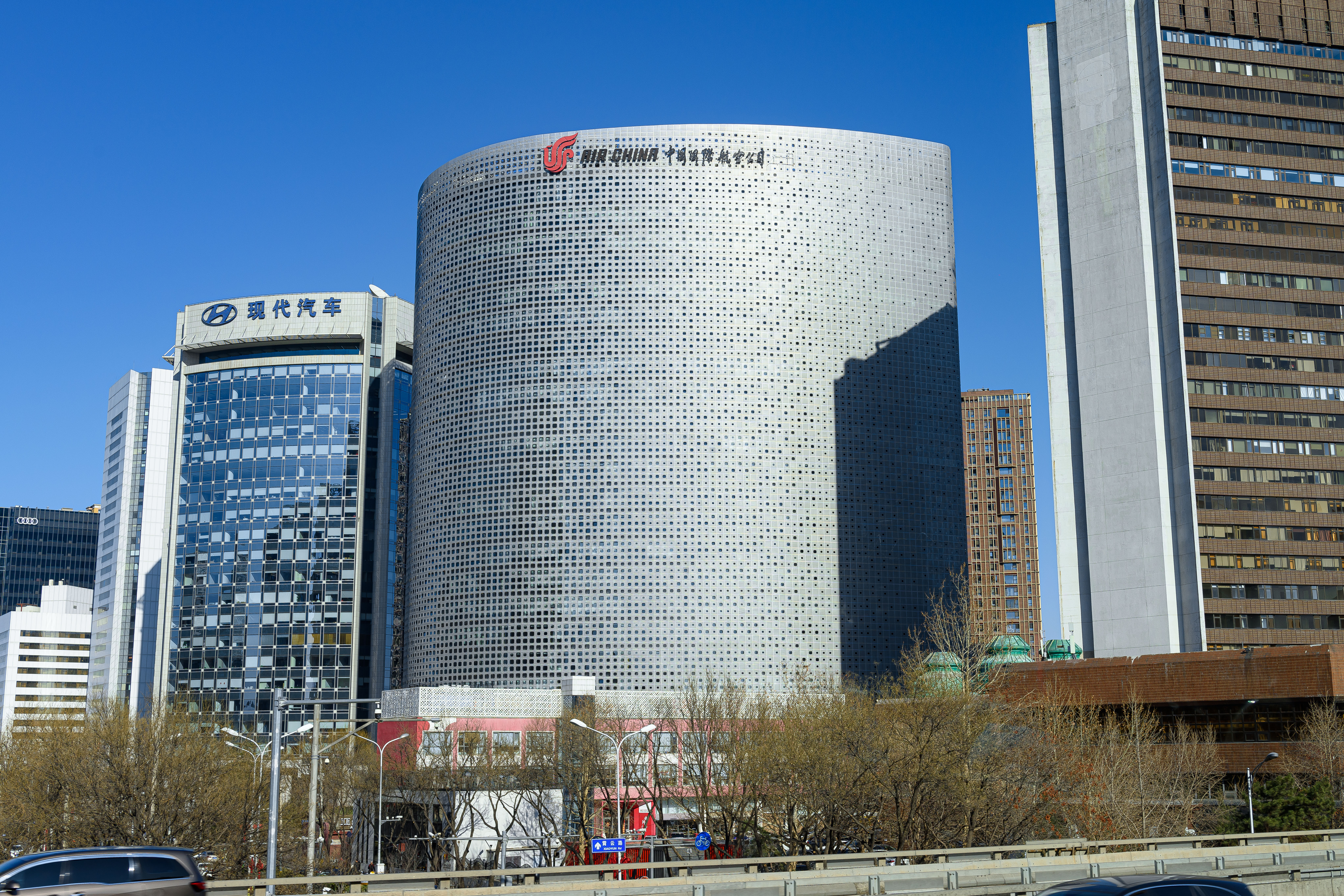
The publisher of Wings of China at Air China Century Plaza

Wings of China is the inflight magazine of Air China. The magazine is published monthly in Beijing, China.

== History and profile ==
The magazine was started in 1992 with the name Wings. Ten years later, in 2002, the magazine was renamed Wings of China. The magazine was published by Air China Media Ltd. on a monthly basis and is based in Beijing. It covers articles in both English and Chinese. Then it began to be published by Cinmedia again on a monthly basis.

Between 2007 and 2009 the magazine was on the list of 100 top valuable magazines by advertising circulation by the China Advertising Association.

== Accusations of racism ==
Wings of China faced accusations of racism when it stated "London is generally a safe place to travel, however precautions are needed when entering areas mainly populated by Indians, Pakistanis and black people" in its September 2016 issue because people felt uncomfortable due to the statement, which meant that travelers must take precautions or avoid multiracial areas. Following the event the parent company of the magazine, Air China, issued an apology.
