= Bell Laboratories Record =

House organ publication of Bell System

Bell Laboratories Record (BLR) was a publication of the Bureau of Publication of the American Telephone and Telegraph Company (AT&T) and Bell Laboratories. It commenced distribution as a house organ for the employees and associates of the laboratories and the Bell System in September 1925, shortly after the founding of Bell Labs as a separate corporate entity. The first Director of Publication was John Mills, leading three managing and assisting editors, and an eleven-member editorial advisory board.

The magazine reported personal, scientific, and organizational information, scholarly articles, and news of interest within the laboratories, Western Electric, and AT&T.

It included descriptions of technologies created at many Bell System locations for basic research, devices, technologies, systems, and operations research relevant to telephone company, manufacturing, and government applications. It was slimmer and less scholarly than the Bell Labs Technical Journal.

On January 1, 1984 the publication was transferred to AT&T Technologies, and subsequently to Lucent Technologies. The successor title was Record—AT&T Bell Laboratories.

== See also ==
- TWX magazine
- Bell Labs Technical Journal
