= Indie Hoy =

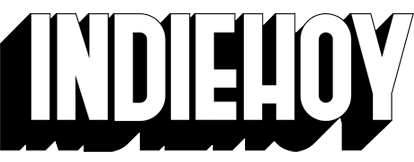
- Indie Hoy logo

- Screenshot of Indie Hoy's homepage
- Website type: Online music magazine
- Available in: Spanish
- Founded: 2008; 18 years ago
- Country of origin: Argentina
- Website: indiehoy.com
- Commercial: Yes
- Launched: 2008; 18 years ago
- Current status: Active

Indie Hoy is an Argentine online publication launched in 2008 and based in Buenos Aires. It publishes daily reviews, news and interviews that mainly focuses on music, also including other forms of popular culture.

== History ==
Indie Hoy was launched in 2008 and is based in Buenos Aires, Argentina. The site has been considered a "benchmark of the Argentine independent scene". In October 2018—in celebration of the ten years since its launch—Indie Hoy organized a music festival at Fundación Konex's venue Ciudad Cultural Konex, with a line-up made up of Louta, Peces Raros, Gativideo, Marina Fages, El Príncipe Idiota, and Tani and Lucia Tachetti.

In 2019, Indie Hoy was a member of the Epica Awards jury.

Since September 2020, Indie Hoy has been part of Faro, an "alliance of Ibero-American musical and cultural media", along with other publications such as Mondosonoro and Zona de Obras.

In 2021, Indie Hoy was nominated for the "Best Graphic Media" award (Spanish: "Mejor medio gráfico") in the first installment of the Latin Plug Awards.

== See also ==
- Argentine rock
- List of magazines in Argentina
- List of music magazines
- List of online magazines
