= Light year (disambiguation) =

A light-year is the distance that light travels through a vacuum in one year.

Light year(s) and lightyear(s) may also refer to:

== Film and television ==
- Buzz Lightyear, a main character in the animated film series Toy Story
  - Lightyear (film), a 2022 spin-off animated film featuring the character
- Light Years (1988 film), a 1988 American re-edit and English-language dub of the 1987 French animated science fiction film Gandahar
- Light Years (2015 film), a British drama film
- Light Years, an American TV series that has been renamed Life Unexpected
- Light Years, a Singaporean drama produced by Mediacorp Channel 5

== Music ==
- Lightyear (band), ska-punk band from the United Kingdom
- Light Years (band), pop-punk band from Cleveland, Ohio
- The Lightyears, pop-rock band based in London, England

=== Albums ===
- Light Years (Chick Corea album), 1987
- Light Years, The Very Best of Electric Light Orchestra, 1997 compilation album by Electric Light Orchestra
- Light Years (Glen Campbell album), 1988
- Light Years (Kylie Minogue album), 2000
- Light-Years (Nas and DJ Premier album), 2025
- Light Year, a 2021 album by Emma Stevens
- Light Years, a 2005 album by Kathy Valentine
- Light Years, a 2012 album by Kora
- Light Years, a 2014 album by Noah23 and David Klopek
- Light Years, a 2008 album by The Shore
- Lightyears, a 2014 album by David Ryan Harris
- Lightyears, a 2012 EP by Mansions on the Moon
- Lightyears, a 2007 album by Shin Terai, Bill Laswell and Buckethead
- Lightyears, a 2001 album by Sunbeam
- A series of 1995 compilation albums by Christian artists, including:
  - The Light Years by Allies
  - The Light Years by Andraé Crouch
  - The Light Years by Bryan Duncan
  - The Light Years by Resurrection Band
  - The Light Years by Sweet Comfort Band
  - The Light Years by Walter Hawkins

=== Songs ===
- "Light Years" (Jamiroquai song), 1994
- "Light Years" (Pearl Jam song), 2000
- "Light Years", 1994 song by Heather Nova from Oyster
- "Lightyears", 1996 song by Eraserheads from Fruitcake (album)
- "Lightyear", 1997 song by Mentallo & The Fixer from Burnt Beyond Recognition
- "Light Years", 2019 song by The National from I Am Easy to Find
- "Light Year", 2018 song by The Story So Far from Proper Dose

== Other uses ==
- Lightyear Entertainment, a movie and music distributor
- Light Years (book), a 1975 novel by James Salter
- Lightyear 0, a Dutch electric car
- Light Year, a Chinese artificial intelligence firm acquired by Meituan in 2023
- Light Years: An Investigation into the Extraterrestrial Experiences of Eduard Meier (1987), a non-fiction book by Gary Kinder

== See also ==
- Parsec (disambiguation)
- Light (disambiguation)
- LY (disambiguation)
- Year
