= Inflight magazine =

Magazine produced for airline customers

An inflight magazine (or in-flight magazine) is a free magazine distributed via the seats of an airplane, by an airline company, or in an airport lounge.

== Overview ==
Many airlines offer in-flight magazines to provide details about their fleet, as well as articles about destinations, travel, and tourism information. In-flight publishing and media are a niche in the magazine industry. Airline titles have controlled distribution costs and readership figures come from existing passenger traffic. Most airlines use external publishers to produce their magazines. In a 2009 Harris Poll, 94% of "business passengers" read in-flight magazines when they traveled by air, with a 30-minute average reading time per flight. Despite the challenges facing the traditional publishing industry, in-flight magazines saw a smaller readership decline than other physical publications during the 2010s. The quality of in-flight magazines varies from carrier to carrier. Their upscale, valuable, and captive readership appeals to advertisers across all sectors: luxury goods makers, car manufacturers, beauty and fashion brands, as well as global destinations.

== History ==
The first in-flight magazine was started by Pan American World Airways in around 1952. Its title, "Clipper Travel", was a reference to their Boeing 314 Clipper aircraft. A decade later, KLM's Holland Herald, the longest running in-flight magazine, was first published in January 1966. In-flight magazines began booming in the 1980s, with new airlines forming them one after another. Some, including Japan Airlines, had over 300 pages in their magazines. This method of flight entertainment has proved to be a success for airlines around the world. To this day, over 150 in-flight magazines are being published.

However, since the birth of digital technology, some key airlines are now offering the chance for magazines to be read digitally via tablet computer applications or over the internet. Some magazines have been discontinued entirely in all formats, such as American Airlines' "American Way" magazine, which was discontinued in 2021.

== Publishers ==
Among specialized publishers are:

- Maxposure Media Group, which produces Shubh Yatra for Air India, Spice Route for SpiceJet Airlines, Vistara Magazine for Vistara Airline (JV between Tata Sons and Singapore Airlines), GoGetter for GoAir India, Trujetter for TruJet Airlines, Fly Smiles for Air Pegasus, Gulf Life for Gulf Air out of Bahrain, Nawras for Air Arabia in Sharjah and Morocco, Saudi Gulf Magazine for Saudigulf Airlines in Saudi Arabia and SalamAir in Oman. It has offices in India, United States, Bangladesh, United Arab Emirates, Bahrain, Saudi Arabia, Morocco, Thailand, Malaysia and Singapore. The sales network spans more than 20 countries. It is the largest custom and in-flight magazine publisher in Asia. The company publishes more than 30 in-flight and custom magazines in over 20 languages and offers a mobile app, digital and social media platforms to its aviation clients.
- Ink is a global media company specializing in content and advertising for the travel sector, headquartered in London. The company works with over 27 airlines, rail and hotel partners worldwide (including American Airlines, United, Qatar Airways, Etihad Airways, easyJet and Norwegian), with offices in London, New York, Miami, São Paulo and Singapore. Ink produces over 27 in-flight magazines in 18 languages, and airline mobile apps for their travel partners. Ink offers advertising across magazines, and passenger travel documents (print-at home boarding passes, booking confirmation emails), in airline mobile apps and online properties. Their media channels reach over 783 million passengers every year.
- GroupSixPro, producing KAConfidential, the exclusive in-flight magazine of KaiserAir.
- ExiGent Magazine is the official and exclusive in-flight magazine of several airlines specializing in business jets throughout Europe and Africa. It also is the corporate magazine of one of the largest luxury real estate agencies. The company works with six airline and real estate agency partners (including Afrijet Business Service, Dassault Falcon Service, Jet Net Alliance, Helipass, Coldwell Banker France et Monaco and Sparfell and Partners). ExiGent Magazine produces six in-flight magazines in two languages, French and English.
- Spafax, a multinational editorial and content marketing company based in London, Montréal and Toronto with more than 70 clients around the world. Its 13 offices worldwide – London, Toronto, Montréal, Santiago, Lima, Dubai, Frankfurt, Madrid, Kuala Lumpur, Miami, New York, California, and Singapore – produce magazines and IFE products for clients such as British Airways, Air Canada, LAN, and Malaysia Airlines.
- Stream, producing around ten in-flight magazines, including CityJet.
- Agency Fish, whose main client is Srilankan Airlines and Garuda Indonesia.
- Motivate Publishing, which produces the in-flight magazine for Open Skies, and Emirates' business- and first-class magazine, Portfolio.
- Cedar Communications, which produces British Airways' High Life, First Life and Business Life.
- G+J Corporate Editors, which produces Lufthansa Magazin, Lufthansa Woman's world, Lufthansa exclusive and Holland Herald.
- Lagardere France, whose main airline client is Air France.
- Subcontinental Media Group, whose main airline clients are Biman Bangladesh Airlines from Bangladesh and Fly Africa Airlines in South Africa. It publishes Bihanga Magazine for Biman and Flyafrica.com Magazine for Fly Africa. It has offices in Dhaka (Bangladesh), New Delhi, Kolkata in India and Johannesburg in South Africa. SMG has a sales network in over 15 key countries in Europe, Asia, and the Americas.
- Bentang Media Nusantara, whose main airline clients are Lion Air, Wings Air and Batik Air.
- In-flight Media and Technologies, which publishes Max Air's in-flight magazine.
- Panorama Media Corp are experienced publishers of consumer titles, specialist publications (including Skyways Magazine for Airlink for the last 30 years) and customer magazines, which compete in quality, design and reader appeal at an international level. Panorama Media Corp. is a full-service publishing company offering a one-stop service solution.
- Shuffle CMS, which produces Jet2.coms' JetAway

== Specialized advertising agencies of in-flight magazines ==
- giO media (in-flight specialist for Benelux, Cyprus and Middle East markets), representing, recommending and centralizing all aspects of in-flight media. It is working for over 75% of all the airlines worldwide, such as British Airways, Air France, KLM, United-Continental, Emirates and Virgin Australia.
- IMM International (in-flight marketing bureau for France, Switzerland, UK, Italy and China markets), representing, recommending and centralizing all aspects of in-flight media. It works with 150 airlines worldwide (more than 200 magazines)
- The Media Ant, representing, recommending and centralizing all aspects of a few airlines. It works with 3 of 12 of the airlines in the country, such as IndiGo, Jetwings and Air Costa.
- In-flight Media and Technologies (in-flight marketing bureau for Max Air in Nigeria), representing and centralizing all aspects of in-flight media for Max Air. It also advertises on board for advertisers inside all Max Air fleets.
- òrkestra, the first media center in Italy specialized exclusively in advertising in in-flight magazines (more than 250 magazines in portfolio) of the most important airlines in the world

== List of in-flight magazines ==
=== North America ===
==== Canada ====
- Air Canada : enRoute and Navi
- Air North : Yukon, North of Ordinary
- Air Transat: Atmosphere
- Canadian North: Up Here
- Porter Airlines : re:Porter
- WestJet : UP!

Esprit de Corps was originally an independently-published inflight magazine for Canadian Forces military passenger flights.

==== Mexico ====
- Aeroméxico : Aire and Accent
- TAESA : Caminos (defunct)
- vivaAerobus : enVIVA
- Volaris : V de Volaris

==== United States ====
- Alaska Airlines : Alaska Beyond
- Allegiant Air : Sunseeker
- Aloha Airlines : Spirit of Aloha
- American Airlines : CL (Celebrated Living) for First and Business Class, NEXOS for Latin American flights
- Delta Air Lines : Sky Magazine
- Frontier Airlines : Wild Blue Yonder
- Hawaiian Airlines : Hana Hou!
- KaiserAir Inc. : KA Confidential
- SeaPort Airlines : Cloud 9 magazine
- Southwest Airlines : Southwest Magazine, previously Spirit Magazine
- Spirit Airlines : Skylights
- United Airlines : Hemispheres (Discontinued on flights, but still used online. ) Rhapsody (defunct) - First Class, Business Class, and United Club magazine
- Vanguard Airlines : Zoom!

==== Caribbean ====
- Caribbean Airlines : Caribbean Beat

=== Central and South America ===
- Aerolíneas Argentinas : Aerolineas Argentinas Magazine (formerly Alta), Cielos Argentinos
- Avianca : Avianca
- Copa Airlines : Panorama
- Gol Linhas Aéreas Inteligentes : GOL
- Grupo TACA : EXPLORE Magazine (defunct)
- LAN Airlines : in, inWines, inPremiere
- LATAM Airlines : Vamos / LATAM
- Varig : Ícaro (defunct)
- VASP : 'Viaje Bem (defunct)

=== Europe ===
- Adria Airways : Adria Airways Inflight Magazine
- Aegean Airlines : Blue
- Aer Lingus : Cara
- Aeroflot : Aeroflot, Aeroflot Premium, Aeroflot Style
- Air Europa : Europa
- Air France : Air France Magazine (Bon Voyage), Air France Madame - business class
- Air Moldova : Altitude Inflight Magazine
- Air Montenegro : Air Time
- Air Serbia : Elevate
- airBaltic: Baltic Outlook
- AirClub : AirClub Magazine
- Aurigny: En Voyage
- Austrian Airlines : Austrian
- Belavia : OnAir
- Blue Panorama Airlines : Mondo in Blue
- bmi : Voyager
- bmibaby : yeahbaby (defunct)
- British Airways : High Life, Business Life - business class, First Life - first class
- Brussels Airlines : b.there!, b.spirit! - long haul
- Bulgaria Air : Bulgaria ON AIR
- Croatia Airlines: Croatia Magazine
- Dan-Air : Dan-Air (defunct)
- easyJet : easyJet Traveller
- Estonian Air : In Time
- Eurowings : Wings
- Finnair : Blue Wings
- Flybe : Flight Time
- Iberia : Ronda, Excelente
- Icelandair: Stopover
- ITA Airways : Airways
- JAT Airways : New Review
- Jet Airlines & Jetwings Domestic and Jetwings International
- Jet2.com: JetAway Magazine
- KLM : Holland Herald
- Loganair : FlightLOG
- LOT Polish Airlines: Kaleidoscope
- Lufthansa : Lufthansa Magazin (Best Magazine in 2021), Woman's World, Lufthansa Exclusiv
- Luxair : Flydoscope
- Malév Hungarian Airlines : Horizon
- Martinair : M
- Meridiana: Atmosphere
- Nordstar : Летать легко (Easy to fly)
- Norwegian Air Shuttle : n Magazine
- Olympic Air : Blue
- Pegasus Airlines : flypgs.com
- PrivatAir : PrivatAir Magazine
- Ryanair : Let's Go Magazine, Runway Retail, Getaway Cafe
- S7 Airlines : S7 Magazine
- Scandinavian Airlines System : Scandinavian Traveler
- SKY express: FLY magazine
- Spanair : Spanorama
- TAP Air Portugal : UP
- TAROM : Insight, SkyLady
- Thomas Cook : Thomas Cook Travel Magazine, Thomas Cook Emporium
- Thomson Airways : Inflight
- Transavia : Enjoy!
- Turkish Airlines : Sky Life
- Ukraine International Airlines : Panorama
- Virgin Atlantic : Vera
- Vueling : Ling
- Wizz Air : Wizz Magazine

=== Africa ===
- Air Afrique: Balafon
- Airlink : Skyways Magazine
- Air Algérie : Tassili
- Air Arabia Maroc: Nawras (Moroccan edition)
- Air Côte d'Ivoire: Le Mag
- Air Mauritius: Islander
- Air Senegal : Teranga
- Air Zimbabwe : Nzira
- Arik Air : Wings
- Azman Air : Fly Safe
- EgyptAir : Horus
- Ethiopian Airlines : selamta
- Fly Africa : Fly Africa Magazine
- Kenya Airways : mSafiri
- LAM : Índico
- Max Air : In-flight Magazine
- Royal Air Maroc : Royal Air Maroc Magazine
- RwandAir : Inzozi
- South African Airways : sawubona
- TAAG : Austral
- Tunisair : La Gazelle

=== Central Asia ===
- Air Astana : Tengri Magazine
- Centrum Air : Centrum
- Qanot Sharq : Qanot Sharq Airlines
- SCAT Airlines : Aspan
- Turkmenistan Airlines : Lachyn
- Uzbekistan Airways : Uzbekistan Airways

=== Asia ===
- Air Cambodia : Air Cambodia
- Air China : Wings of China
- Air India : Shubh Yatra (Happy Journey) Namaste.AI
- Air Macau : Air Macau Magazine
- Air Mandalay : Air Mandalay - Golden Flight
- AirAsia : redcap
- AirAsia Cambodia : Travel 360
- AirAsia X : Travel 360
- AirSWIFT : InFlight Traveller
- All Nippon Airways : Tsubasa no Okoku/ TSUBASA Global Wings
- Asiana Airlines : Asiana
- Bamboo Airways : Bamboo Green
- Bangkok Airways : Fah Thai
- Batavia Air : Batavia Air
- Batik Air : Lion Air Group
- Batik Air Malaysia : Batik Air Malaysia
- Biman Bangladesh Airlines : Bihanga
- Cambodia Airways : The Traveller
- Cathay Pacific : Cathay
- Cebu Pacific : Smile
- China Airlines : Dynasty
- China Eastern Airlines : Connections
- China Southern Airlines: NiHao (English), Gateway 南方航空 (Chinese), Elite (Chinese)
- Citilink : Linkers
- Druk Air : Tashi Delek
- Eastar Jet : Eastar Jet
- EVA Air : enVoyage
- Garuda Indonesia : Colours
- GoAir : go-getter
- Hainan Airlines : Hai Vision
- Himalaya Airlines : Danfe
- Hebei Airlines : Hebei Airlines
- HK Express : Uexplore
- Hong Kong Airlines : +852
- IndiGo : Hello 6E
- Indonesia AirAsia : Travel 360
- Japan Airlines : Skyward
- Jeju Air : Joy & Joy
- Jetstar Airways : Jetstar Japan
- Juneyao Airlines : The Moment
- Korean Air : Morning Calm, Beyond
- Lanmei Airlines : Time To Travel
- Lao Airlines : Champa Meuanglao
- Lion Air : Lion Air Group
- Malaysia Airlines : Going Places
- Merpati Nusantara Airlines : Merpati Archipelago
- MIAT Mongolian Airlines : MIAT Mongolian Airlines
- Mihin Lanka : AHASA
- Myanmar Airways International : Mingalabar
- Myanmar National Airlines : MNA
- Nepal Airlines : Shangri-La
- Nok Air : Jibjib
- Novoair : Novoneel
- Pakistan International Airlines : Humsafar
- PAL Express : La Isla
- Philippine Airlines : Mabuhay
- Philippines AirAsia : Travel 360
- Royal Brunei Airlines : Muhibah
- Safi Airways : Safi Airways Inflight Magazine
- Scoot : Scoot
- Sempati Air : Connexions
- Shenzhen Airlines : Shenzhen Airlines
- Sichuan Airlines : SCAL
- Singapore Airlines : SilverKris
- SpiceJet : SpiceRoute
- SriLankan Airlines : Serendib
- Sriwijaya Air : Sriwijaya
- Starlux Airlines : kiânn
- Super Air Jet : Lion Air Group
- Thai AirAsia : Travel 360
- Thai AirAsia X : Travel 360
- Thai Airways : Sawasdee
- Thai Lion Air : Lionmag Thai
- Thai VietJet Air : One2Fly Thailand
- Tigerair Taiwan : Tiger Tales
- TransNusa : Pesona Nusantara
- TruJet : Trujetter magazine
- TurboJet : Horizon
- T'way Air : Change Begins
- US-Bangla Airlines : Blue Sky
- VietJet Air : One2Fly
- Vietnam Airlines : Heritage (monthly), Heritage Fashion (monthly starting 15th day of the month), Heritage Japan (quarterly)
- Wings Air : Lion Air Group
- XiamenAir : XiamenAir
- Xpress Air : Xpress Air

=== Middle East ===
- Air Arabia: Nawras
- Azerbaijan Airlines : Azerbaijan Airlines
- El Al : Atmosphere
- Emirates : Open Skies and Portfolio for business and first class.
- Etihad Airways : Atlas
- flynas : flynas magazine
- Georgian Airways : Georgian Airways
- Gulf Air : Gulf Life
- Iraqi Airways : IraqSky
- Jazeera Airways : J Magazine
- Kuwait Airways : Al-Buraq
- Middle East Airlines : Cedar Wings
- Oman Air : Wings of Oman
- Qatar Airways : Oryx
- Royal Jordanian : Royal Wings
- SalamAir : Salam
- Saudia : Ahlan Wasahlan
- Saudigulf: Saudi Gulf magazine

=== Oceania ===
- Air New Zealand : Kia Ora
- Air Niugini : Paradise
- Air Tahiti : Air Tahiti
- Air Vanuatu : Island Spirit
- Aircalin : Altitude
- Fiji Airways : FijiTime
- Jetstar Airways : Jetstar Australia
- Qantas : Qantas The Australian Way
- Virgin Australia : Voyeur

== Similar magazines ==
Quite similar to in-flight magazines, some railroad companies offer a comparable product aboard their long-distance trains, e.g. Deutsche Bahn's mobil or Indian Railways' Rail Bandhu magazine. This magazine is also distributed via the seats of the passenger cars.

== See also ==
- Aircraft safety card
- Sickness bag
- SkyMall
