= Holland Herald =

Dutch inflight magazine

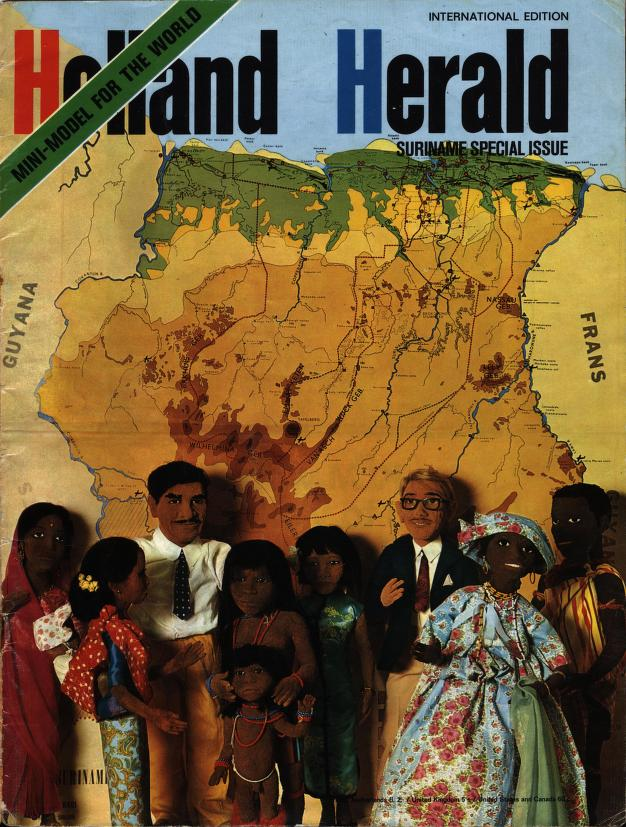
- The cover of a 1968 issue covering Suriname
- Categories: Inflight magazine
- Frequency: Monthly
- Publisher: Hearst Communications
- First issue: 21 January 1966
- Country: The Netherlands
- Based in: Amsterdam
- Language: English
- Website: Holland Herald
- ISSN: 0018-3563
- OCLC: 905455594

Holland Herald is the inflight magazine of the Dutch airline KLM. Launched in 1966 it is the oldest inflight magazine.

== History and profile ==
Holland Herald was first published on 21 January 1966. In the first year the magazine was published bimonthly and black and white. Next year its frequency was switched to monthly. The magazine is published in English.

Holland Herald was formerly published by the Ink Publishing. The company began to publish it in 2009. The Netherland branch of the Hearst company, Hearst Netherlands, is the publisher of the magazine.

CNN named Holland Herald as the tenth best inflight magazine worldwide in 2012. The content of the magazine includes articles concerning the contemporary Dutch culture, commerce, and politics. The first 3D advertisement was published in the magazine which featured a beer brand, Heineken.

Holland Herald was redesigned in April 2022. The Content Marketing Grand Prix awarded the magazine in the categories of the magazine and content design in October 2022.
