= Scandinavian Traveler =

Swedish inflight magazine

- Categories: Inflight magazine
- Frequency: Monthly
- First issue: November 2014
- Company: Scandinavian Airlines
- Country: Sweden
- Based in: Stockholm
- Website: Scandinavian Traveler

Scandinavian Traveler is the inflight magazine of Scandinavian Airlines (SAS).

== History and profile ==
Scandinavian Traveler was established as a successor to Scanorama, former inflight magazine of SAS. The magazine was first published in November 2014. It is published on a monthly basis and covers lifestyle- and travel-related articles. The printed magazine is published in English, and online versions of the magazine are published in Norwegian, Swedish, Danish and English.

The second issue of the magazine, published in December 2014, was suspended by SAS when it led to criticism of Norway's Progress Party due to the article by Swedish journalist Per Svensson. The article was concerned with the recent increase of right-wing extremist parties in Scandinavian countries.

Scandinavian Traveler has won numerous awards, for example, the Swedish Content Awards for its cover design of the issue Hit men in 2016. The magazine has 1.4 million readers monthly, and since the launch the online versions has had 1.3 million visitors.
