= Sea Breezes (magazine) =

Maritime magazine published in the United Kingdom

- Categories: Ships
- Frequency: Monthly
- First issue: December 1919
- Final issue: December 2025
- Country: Isle of Man
- Language: English
- Website: www.seabreezes.co.im (archived from the original)
- ISSN: 0036-9977

Sea Breezes was a monthly magazine devoted to the worldwide shipping industry focusing on maritime news, including specialist coverage of naval, ferry, coastal, sail and cruise sectors. It also explored ships, ports, maritime events and places in depth, in regular feature articles.

== History ==
Sea Breezes was first published in December 1919 as the house magazine of the Pacific Steam Navigation Company. The first editor was Thomas Edwin Edwards. It soon expanded its focus to include news about commercial shipping in general and featured many articles about historical ships and shipping in the Age of Sail. Ten issues were produced each year.

To reflect this change in focus the title was changed in 1937 or 1938 to Sea Breezes - The Ship Lovers' Magazine and the price increased from 3d to 6d per copy. It was at that time published by Charles Birchall and Sons, 17 James Street, Liverpool. The magazine ceased production in October 1939 for the duration of World War II. Paper had become difficult to source and the editor, Lieutenant-Commander J Francis Hall was on active service with the Royal Navy.

Production resumed in 1946. The title had again changed, and was now Sea Breezes - The Ship Lovers' Digest. In 1965, twelve issues were produced each year. The physical format of the journal underwent various changes. The first color photograph was used on the cover in August 1973.

The publication continued to be produced by a team based in the Isle of Man. More than 1000 issues of the journal were published. By 2019 it had a readership of over 65,000. The last edition was published in December 2025.
