= Anguil =

Coordinates: 36°31′S 64°01′W

- Rural locality and village
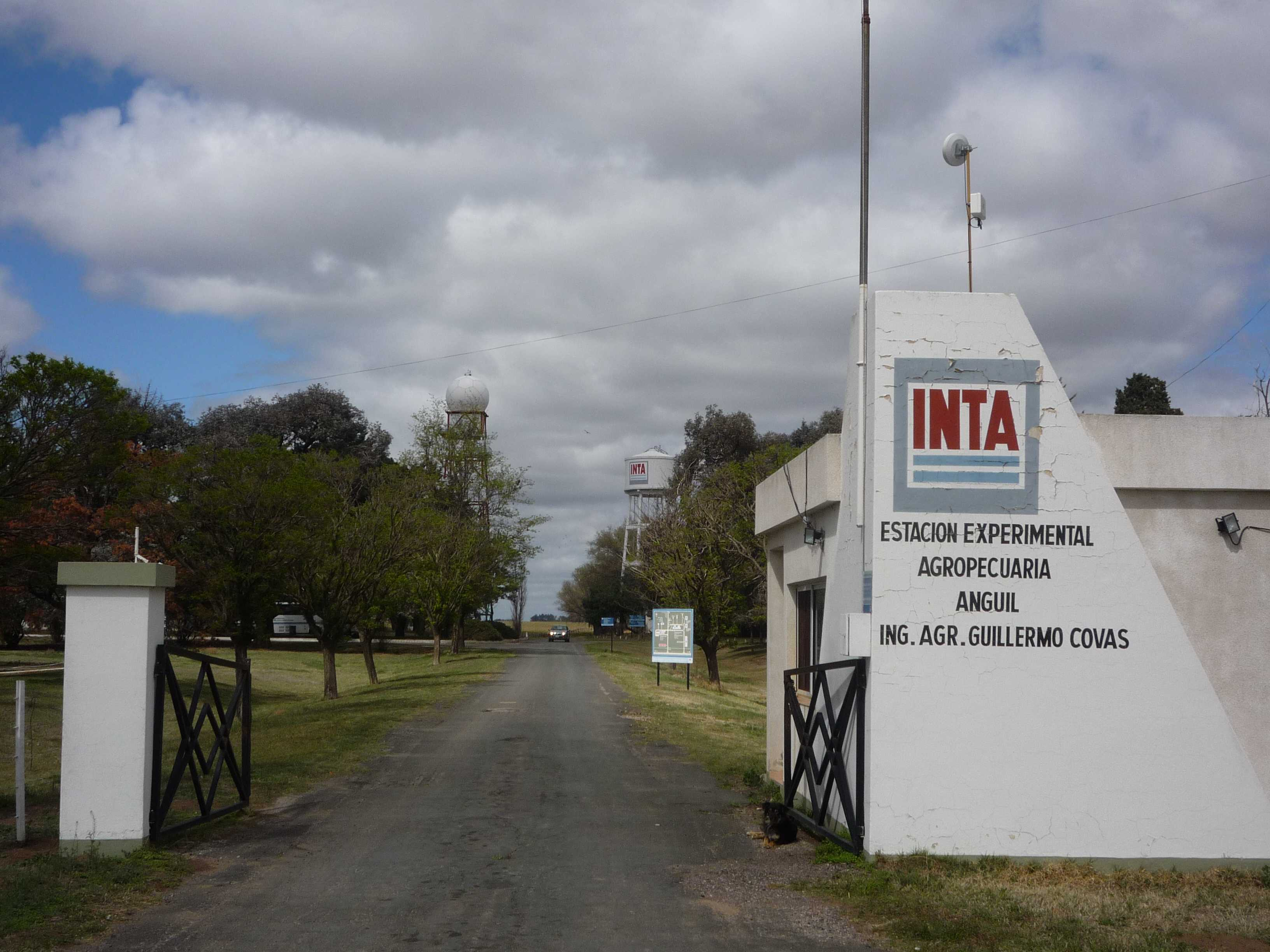
- Interactive map of Anguil
- Country: Argentina
- Province: La Pampa La Pampa Province
- Department: Capital
- Established: December 2, 1906

Government
  - Mayor: Diego S. Fernández

Area
  - Total: 850 km^{2} (330 sq mi)
- Elevation: 152 m (499 ft)

Population (2001)
  - Total: 1,630
- Time zone: UTC−3 (ART)
- Postal code: L6326
- Area code: 02954

Anguil is a village and rural locality (municipality) in the Capital Department, in La Pampa Province in Argentina. It is located at the edge of National Route 5, approximately 26 km from the city of Santa Rosa.

== Toponym ==
Anguil comes from Mapudungun and means olivillo-olivillo or lands of olivillo. This is how Elisha Tello translates it because the olivillo is a plant that is abundant in the region and its color gives the fields a silvery hue. However, according to Enrique Stieben, a compiler of Pampean Aboriginal terms, he indicates that it means "dry calden" or "dry bush."

== History ==
The village of Anguil was officially established on December 2, 1906, by Eduardo and Alberto Castex, father and son respectively. They at first donated land for the public square, the City Hall, the Police Station, the Italian and Spanish societies, the Magistrates Court and the church.

Also, with the founding of the railroad station, on loan from the Trenque Lauquen-Santa Rosa (Ferrocarril Oeste) branch, Eduardo Castex partitioned six leagues of his fields adjacent to the railway station and almost all the land located north and northwest of the same. To access these lands, Castex granted credit facilities that allowed the settlement of hundreds of families.

In 2006 the town celebrated its centenary since it was founded by Eduardo and Alberto Castex. The legend inscribed on a medal of the time with that date, led to the establishment of December 2, 1906, as the founding day of the town that is located 35 miles east of Santa Rosa, in the Capital Department.

Besides Santa Rosa, Anguil is the only urban center in the Capital Department. The Catriló-Toay railway branch passed through here, its inauguration took place in 1897, nine years before its founding. Like Lonquimay, Anguil was supplied with water using a tank that was located within the territory. In the case of Anguil, this continued for more than a decade after there were people in the area; urbanization occurred only in 1906.

== History of the Anguil Agricultural Experimental Station (INTA) ==
The creation of the Agricultural Experiment Station acquired relevance during the provincial era, located on National Route 5 near the village. It became operational in 1954, in a property acquired by the Province and then transferred to the national level. With the creation of the National Institute of Agricultural Technology (INTA), in 1956 and its organization in 1958 the station became a part of it, contributing to the development of the region with the diffusion of weeping lovegrass and conservation practices, among other contributions. From 1996 it was renamed after its first director, the agricultural engineer Guillermo Covas. In 2008 a weather radar was installed to integrate it to the Civil Defense System in Argentina. Its goal is to reach 480 km, and it is the third in operation, after those installed in Pergamino (Buenos Aires), and Oro Verde (Paraná, Entre Ríos).

== Climate ==
Climate data for Anguil (1973–2016)
Month	Jan	Feb	Mar	Apr	May	Jun	Jul	Aug	Sep	Oct	Nov	Dec	Year
Record high °C (°F)	44.5 (112.1)	39.6 (103.3)	37.8 (100.0)	35.5 (95.9)	30.8 (87.4)	25.7 (78.3)	27.3 (81.1)	34.0 (93.2)	34.0 (93.2)	36.6 (97.9)	38.0 (100.4)	41.2 (106.2)	44.5 (112.1)
Mean daily maximum °C (°F)	30.6 (87.1)	29.2 (84.6)	26.6 (79.9)	22.6 (72.7)	18.1 (64.6)	14.9 (58.8)	14.5 (58.1)	17.3 (63.1)	19.9 (67.8)	22.8 (73.0)	26.4 (79.5)	29.6 (85.3)	22.6 (72.7)
Daily mean °C (°F)	23.0 (73.4)	21.7 (71.1)	19.5 (67.1)	15.3 (59.5)	11.3 (52.3)	8.0 (46.4)	7.4 (45.3)	9.5 (49.1)	12.2 (54.0)	15.6 (60.1)	18.9 (66.0)	21.9 (71.4)	15.4 (59.7)
Mean daily minimum °C (°F)	15.2 (59.4)	14.0 (57.2)	12.2 (54.0)	8.1 (46.6)	4.5 (40.1)	1.3 (34.3)	0.5 (32.9)	1.8 (35.2)	4.2 (39.6)	8.0 (46.4)	10.9 (51.6)	14.0 (57.2)	7.9 (46.2)
Record low °C (°F)	1.5 (34.7)	1.5 (34.7)	−2.0 (28.4)	−9.1 (15.6)	−10.5 (13.1)	−11.2 (11.8)	−13.2 (8.2)	−11.2 (11.8)	−10.5 (13.1)	−4.8 (23.4)	−2.9 (26.8)	1.5 (34.7)	−13.2 (8.2)
Average precipitation mm (inches)	98.3 (3.87)	92.3 (3.63)	107.3 (4.22)	62.4 (2.46)	31.5 (1.24)	19.6 (0.77)	20.9 (0.82)	25.5 (1.00)	47.7 (1.88)	86.7 (3.41)	81.1 (3.19)	96.2 (3.79)	769.5 (30.30)
Average precipitation days	8	7	7	6	5	4	4	3	5	9	7	8	71
Average relative humidity (%)	59	64	68	70	74	74	72	64	61	63	58	56	65
Mean monthly sunshine hours	294.5	251.4	232.5	180.0	145.7	123.0	139.5	170.5	189.0	223.2	267.0	291.4	2,507.7
Percentage possible sunshine	67	66	61	54	46	42	46	51	53	55	63	65	57
Source: Instituto Nacional de Tecnología Agropecuaria

== Education ==
Anguil features School No. 39 Nicolás Avellaneda founded in 1909 which operates on two shifts (morning and evening), with a division of each course per shift (1st and 2nd cycle of EGB) and the Enrique Stieben High School founded in 1988, operating in the morning shift and attended by 60 students, with a staff of 18 teachers as well as a teaching assistant, a secretary and assistant director. It is oriented towards the Humanities and Social Sciences modality, which was chosen by the parents of the Polimodal students. There is also a Third Cycle programme along with courses presented by other local institutions.

== Sports ==
In 1934 Club Anguilense was created and in 1964, Club Ferro. Later Anguilense and the Unión Italiana merged and formed the current Centro Social y Deportivo.
