= Princeton Application Repository for Shared-Memory Computers =

Type of computer benchmarking tool

PARSEC Benchmark Suite
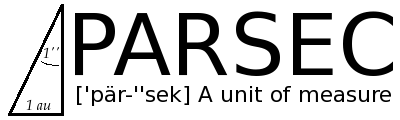
- Original author(s): Princeton University and Intel
- Developer(s): Christian Bienia
- Initial release: January 25, 2008
- Stable release: 2.1 / August 13, 2009
- Written in: C/C++
- Operating system: Linux, OpenSolaris
- Type: Benchmark
- License: 3-clause BSD
- Website: parsec.cs.princeton.edu

Princeton Application Repository for Shared-Memory Computers (PARSEC) is a benchmark suite composed of multi-threaded emerging workloads that is used to evaluate and develop next-generation chip-multiprocessors. It was collaboratively created by Intel and Princeton University to drive research efforts on future computer systems. Since its inception the benchmark suite has become a community project that is continued to be improved by a broad range of research institutions. PARSEC is freely available and is used for both academic and non-academic research.

== Background ==
The introduction of chip-multiprocessors required computer manufacturers to rewrite software for the first time to take advantage of parallel processing capabilities, including rewriting existing systems for testing and development. At that time parallel software only existed in very specialized areas. However, before chip-multiprocessors became commonly available software developers were not willing to rewrite any mainstream programs, which means hardware manufacturers did not have access to any programs for test and development purposes that represented the expected real-world program behavior accurately. This posed a hen-and-egg problem that motivated a new type of benchmark suite with parallel programs that could take full advantage of chip-multiprocessors.

PARSEC was created to break this circular dependency. It was designed to fulfill the following five objectives:

1. Focuses on multithreaded applications
2. Includes emerging workloads
3. Has a diverse selection of programs
4. Workloads employ state-of-art techniques
5. The suite supports research

Traditional benchmarks that were publicly available before PARSEC were generally limited in their scope of included application domains or typically only available in an unparallelized, serial version. Parallel programs were only prevalent in the domain of High-Performance Computing and on a much smaller scale in business environments. Chip-multiprocessors however were expected to be heavily used in all areas of computing such as with parallelized consumer applications.

== Workloads ==
The PARSEC Benchmark Suite is available in version 2.1, which includes the following workloads:

- Blackscholes
- Bodytrack
- Canneal
- Dedup
- Facesim
- Ferret
- Fluidanimate
- Freqmine
- Raytrace
- Streamcluster
- Swaptions
- Vips
- X264
