= Hana Hou! =

American inflight magazine for Hawaiian Airlines

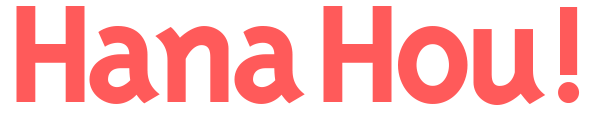
- Editor-in-Chief: Michael Shapiro
- Director of Photography: Matt Mallams
- Categories: Inflight magazine
- Frequency: Bi-monthly
- Circulation: 110,000
- Publisher: NMG Network
- First issue: 1998
- Company: NMG Network
- Country: United States
- Based in: Honolulu
- Language: English
- Website: www.hawaiianairlines.com/hawaii-stories/hana-hou

Hana Hou! is an American bi-monthly English language inflight magazine published for Hawaiian Airlines by Honolulu-based NMG Network. As of September 2025, it is the last domestic inflight print publication.

Hana Hou! (which means encore! in the Hawaiian language) is a general-interest publication that includes feature stories, in-depth stories about Native Hawaiian and Island culture, natural history, sciences, arts, Hawai‘i history, profiles, a calendar of events and an ‘Island Intelligence’ section.

The awards which the magazine has received include two in 2007 from the Hawaiian chapter of the Society of Professional Journalists, and many more before and since.

Hana Hou! maintains an archive including back issues going back as far as 2022 on its website. While complimentary copies are provided on all Hawaiian Airlines flights, the magazine is also marketed at newsstands in Hawai‘i and by subscription.
