= Lonquimay, La Pampa =

Coordinates: 36°28′S 63°37′W

Lonquimay (La Pampa)
- Rural locality and village
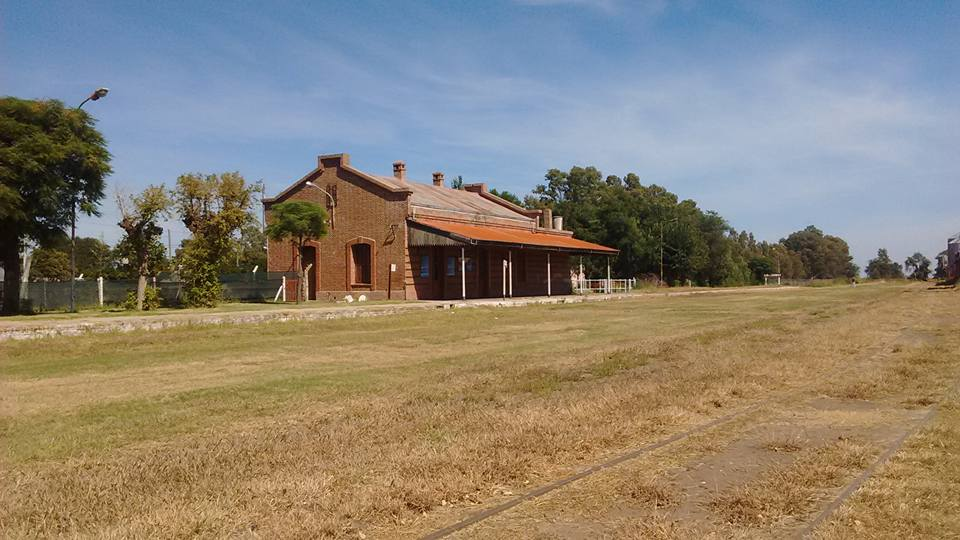

- Flag
- Interactive map of Lonquimay (La Pampa)
- Country: Argentina
- Province: La Pampa
- Time zone: UTC−3 (ART)

Lonquimay (La Pampa) is a village and rural locality (municipality) in La Pampa Province in Argentina.
