= Propuesta y control =

Argentine political magazine

- Founder: Raúl Alfonsín and Yuyo Roulet
- Founded: 1976
- Final issue: December 1992
- Country: Argentina

Propuesta y control (English: "Proposal and control") was an Argentine magazine established in 1976 by Raúl Alfonsín and Yuyo Roulet. Although Alfonsín was a prominent leader of the Radical Civic Union, the magazine featured editorials from people unrelated to the party.

The magazine was directed by Alfonsin in two periods: from August 1976 to October 1978 and from March 1990 to December 1992.
