= Aerolineas Argentinas Magazine =

Monthly inflight magazine of Aerolineas Argentinas

Aerolineas Argentinas Magazine is the monthly in-flight magazine of Aerolíneas Argentinas which has existed since 1993.

== History and profile ==
The magazine was established in 1993 with the name Alta. It was rebranded as Aerolineas Argentinas Magazine in 2002. The magazine, based in Buenos Aires, is distributed on international and domestic flights. It published by Manzi Publicidad, S.A., on a monthly basis. The magazine has Spanish and English editions. Carlos Manzi served as the editor-in-chief of the magazine until late 2015 when he was removed from the post.
