= Bell Labs Technical Journal =

- Discipline: Electrical engineering, computer science, telecommunication
- Language: English
- Edited by: Charlie Bahr

Publication details
- Former names: AT&T Technical Journal, AT&T Bell Laboratories Technical Journal, Bell System Technical Journal
- History: 1922–2020
- Publisher: Institute of Electrical and Electronics Engineers
- Frequency: Annually (1996–2020); Monthly (1952–1995); Quarterly (1922–1951)
- Impact factor: 0.333 (2020)

Standard abbreviations
- ISO 4: Bell Labs Tech. J.

Indexing
- Bell Labs Technical Journal
- ISSN: 1089-7089 (print); 1538-7305 (web)
- LCCN: 96642116
- OCLC no.: 35120920
- AT&T Technical Journal
- ISSN: 8756-2324
- LCCN: 85644399
- OCLC no.: 11492357
- AT&T Bell Laboratories Technical Journal
- ISSN: 0748-612X
- LCCN: 29029519
- OCLC no.: 10464416
- Bell System Technical Journal
- CODEN: BSTJAN
- ISSN: 0005-8580
- LCCN: 29029519
- OCLC no.: 6313803

Links
- Journal homepage; Bell System Technical Journal; Bell System Technical Journal Online archive

The Bell Labs Technical Journal was the in-house scientific journal for scientists of Bell Labs, published yearly by the IEEE society.

The journal was originally established as The Bell System Technical Journal (BSTJ) in New York by the American Telephone and Telegraph Company (AT&T) in 1922. It was published under this name until 1983, when the breakup of the Bell System placed various parts of the companies in the system into independent corporate entities. The journal was devoted to the scientific fields and engineering disciplines practiced in the Bell System for improvements in the wide field of electrical communication. After the restructuring of Bell Labs in 1984, the journal was renamed to AT&T Bell Laboratories Technical Journal. In 1985, it was published as the AT&T Technical Journal until 1996, when it was renamed to Bell Labs Technical Journal. The journal was discontinued in 2020. The last managing editor was Charles Bahr.

== History ==
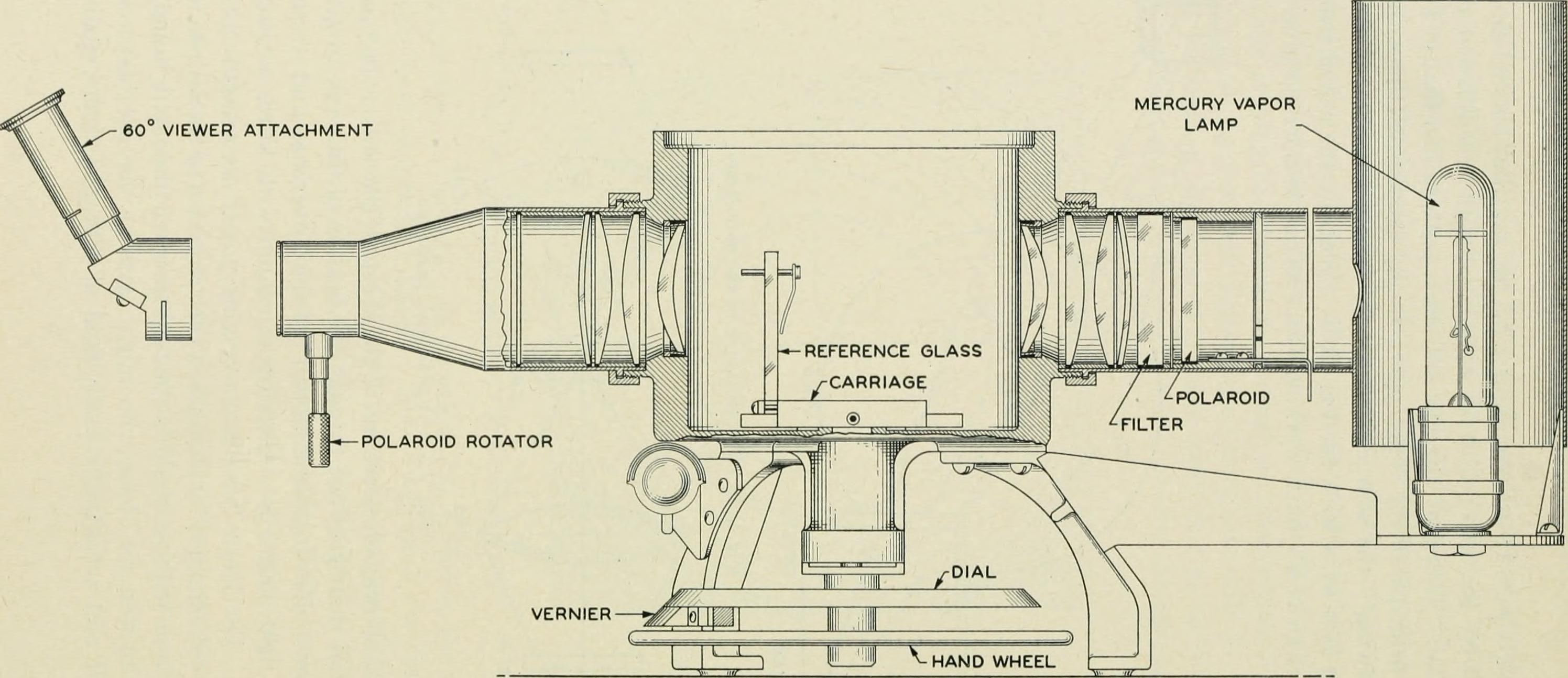
Page from The Bell System Technical Journal (1922)

The Bell System Technical Journal was published by The Information Department of the American Telephone and Telegraph Company in New York City, on behalf of the Western Electric Company and the Associated Companies of the Bell System. The first issue was released in July 1922, under the editorship of R. W. King and an eight-member editorial board. Its mission was to fill the desire for a technical journal to "collect, print, reprint, and make readily the more important articles" for the electrical communication engineer in a broad array of related disciplines, that were previously scattered in numerous other industry publications.

From 1922 to 1951, the publication schedule was quarterly. It was bimonthly until 1964, and finally produced ten monthly issues per year until the end of 1983, combining the four summer months into two issues in May and July.

Publication of the journal under the name Bell System Technical Journal ended with Volume 62 by the end of 1983, because of the divestiture of AT&T. After reorganization, publication continued as the AT&T Bell Laboratories Technical Journal in 1984 with Volume 63, maintaining the volume sequence numbers established since 1922. In 1985, Bell Laboratories was removed from the title, resulting in AT&T Technical Journal until 1995 (Volume 74).

In 1996, the journal was revamped under the name Bell Labs Technical Journal, and publication management was transferred to Wiley Periodicals, Inc., establishing a new volume sequence (Volume 1).

=== Editors ===
The journal was directed by the following former editors:

- 1922 (July) R.W. King
- 1954 J.D. Tebo
- 1957 (May) W.D. Bulloch
- 1959 (January) H.S. Renne
- 1961 (March) G.E. Schindler Jr.

== Abstracting and indexing ==
The following abstracting and indexing services cover the journal:

- EBSCO databases
- CSA Illumina
- Compendex
- Current Contents/Engineering, Computing & Technology
- Current Index to Statistics
- Expanded Academic ASAP
- FIZ Karlsruhe – CompuScience Database
- METADEX
- Science Citation Index Expanded
- Scopus

According to the Journal Citation Reports, the journal has a 2020 impact factor of 0.333.

== Notable papers ==
The Bell System Technical Journal and its successors published many papers on seminal works and revolutionary achievements at Bell Labs, including the following:

- In 1928, Clinton Joseph Davisson published a paper on electron diffraction by nickel crystal, thus unambiguously establishing the wave nature of the electron. This discovery led to a widespread acceptance of the particle-wave duality of matter and won him the 1937 Nobel Prize in Physics.
- Claude Shannon's paper "A Mathematical Theory of Communication", which founded the field of information theory, was published as a two-part article in July and October issue of 1948.
- The journal previously published numerous articles disclosing the internal operation of the long-distance switching system used in direct distance dialing (DDD) in the Bell System in the 1950s and 1960s. Articles such as those by A. Weaver and N.A. Newel (In-Band Single-Frequency Signaling), and by C. Breen and C.A. Dahlbom (Signaling Systems for Control of Telephone Switching) enabled phone phreaks to develop the blue box apparatus, which mimicked the switching system's signals to allow them to make free long-distance calls.
- Many landmark papers from the developers of the UNIX operating system appeared in the UNIX themed July and August 1978 issue.
- The 2009 Nobel Prize physicists Willard Boyle and George E. Smith described their new charge-coupled device in the journal in a 1970 paper.

== See also ==
- TWX magazine
- Bell Laboratories Record
- Scientific journal
