= Zone (magazine) =

Zone was a Buenos Aires, Argentina-based forum for international poetry and prose.

== History and profile ==
In December 2006, Zone presented La Nueva Poesía Ruskaya (The New Russian Poetry) at Crack-Up bookstore, in Palermo Soho, Buenos Aires, featuring translations from Russian to English by Russian-American poet Peter Dimitry Golub, and English to Spanish by Zone contributors Mariana Calandra, Roger McDonough and Andrew Haley. La Nueva Poesía Ruskaya introduced the poetry of Viktor Ivaniv, Julia Idlis, Danila Davydov and other members of "Russia’s Debut Poets" to South America.

Zone maintained an online magazine featuring avant-garde and world poetry and prose until 2012. Past contributors include Richard Cronshey, Sergio Balari Ravera, Pino Blasone, Martins Iyoboyi, Ayn Frances dela Cruz, Rodrigo Verdugo Pizarro, MK Ajay and Prakash Kona.
