= SoloSol =

SoloSol was founded in tabloid format publishing poems, drawings, comics, articles and critics about film, literature, music and visual art created by Gustavo Aguerre. It existed between 1973 and 1974. The founder of the counterculture magazine was Gustavo Aguerre. It was open to collaborations from anyone and had a free anarchistic bent. Published as it was during the military dictatorship of General Alejandro Lanusse, Gustavo Aguerre did not accept propaganda contributions from collaborators and accepted political collaborations only if they had high artistic quality.

The magazine ceased to exist when Aguerre left Buenos Aires for Damascus. In 1974, another version of "SoloSol" was published by H. Sapere and M. Aguirre, but its direction was quite different, supporting the Peronist Youth.
