= MCS (fashion brand) =

Italian fashion brand

- Industry: Fashion
- Founded: 1986; 40 years ago
- Headquarters: Italy
- Area served: Worldwide
- Products: Apparel and accessories
- Revenue: €170 million (2008)
- Parent: Emerisque Brands
- Website: www.mcsapparel.eu.com

MCS (formerly Marlboro Classics) is an international fashion lifestyle brand based in Italy. Born in the 1970s as Marlboro Country Store, the brand changed name to Marlboro Sportswear in 1984, then became Marlboro Classics in 1987 and MCS in 2009.

== Today ==
MCS is distributed in over 50 countries, has 180 stores, and over 1,000 shop in shops. Key retail partners include Galeries Lafayette, Coin, Printemps and Galeria Inno (fr). It is also the official license partner for MotoGP and Ford Mustang fashion products.
