= Scanorama =

The October 2005 issue of Scanorama with Fredrik Eklund on the cover

Scanorama was the award-winning inflight magazine of SAS. It was one of the magazines produced by SAS.

Scanorama was established in 1972. Twelve issues were released yearly. The publisher was DG Communications AB based in Stockholm. It was published in English. One of the editors-in-chief was Naljen Ståhlström. The magazine had approximately two million readers each month. The magazine was shut down in 2014 and was replaced by Scandinavian Traveler in November 2014.

== See also ==
- SAS Media
