= Veintitrés =

News magazine in Argentina

- Director: Diego Saraceni
- Categories: News
- Frequency: Weekly
- Publisher: Manucorp, S.A.
- Total circulation: 26,000 (2011)
- First issue: 16 July 1998
- Final issue: October 2016 (print)
- Country: Argentina
- Based in: Buenos Aires
- Language: Spanish
- Website: veintitres.com.ar
- ISSN: 1851-6602

Veintitrés (meaning Twenty-three in English) was a weekly print news magazine published in Buenos Aires, Argentina. Founded in 1998, the magazine became online-only publication from October 2016.

== History ==
The magazine was established in 1998 as XXI, in reference both to the upcoming century, and to Lanata's previous publication Página/12 (21 is 12 with the figures reversed), by Jorge Lanata and colleagues from the television news magazine, Día D: Adolfo Castelo, Olga Gatti, Claudio Martínez, Jorge Repiso, Ernesto Tenembaum, and Marcelo Zlotogwiazda. The first issue appeared on 16 July 1998. It was advertised as La revista del siglo que viene ("The magazine for the century to come"). Later, as people would keep calling it "siglo veintiuno" rather than just veintiuno ("Twenty-one,") it changed its name to "Veintiuno". It later appeared as Veintidós (Twenty-two), and from 2000 onward by its current title, meaning twenty-three.

Much as Lanata's successful news daily, Página/12, had done, Veintitrés adopted a format of bold headlines and graphics, as well as a muck-raking editorial style. Its target audience is the middle and high socioeconomic classes and professionals, government officials, and students. The magazine also became known for its gag gifts, chosen in allusion to the news story of the day. Lanata sold a 75% stake in 2001 to investigative journalist Ernesto Tenenbaum, after which Veintitrés was directed by Guillermo Alfieri; Alfieri left the magazine in 2008 to join Lanata's short-lived Crítica de la Argentina. Veintitrés was purchased in 2008 by Sergio Szpolski, who, in turn, sold a 50% stake in Grupo Veintitrés (which also published Newsweek Argentina, Tiempo Argentino, among other periodicals, and operates Channel 23) to Matías Garfunkel in 2011. The media group's broadcasters and publications established themselves as some of the most supportive of Kirchnerism among Argentina's diverse media.

In October 2016 the last print edition of Veintitrés published, and the magazine was made an online publication.
