= Hemispheres (magazine) =

United Airlines' inflight magazine

Hemispheres is United Airlines' inflight magazines. The magazine is circulated monthly and reaches 139 million passengers annually. The magazine was formerly produced in Greensboro, North Carolina. It is currently produced in New York City.

Hemispheres was established in 1992. Its editorial coverage includes its signature ‘3 Perfect Days’ travel piece, and the latest news in business, travel, fashion, and culture. The magazine reaches a highly influential business and leisure traveller audience, with a median household income of $128,000, spending and profession.

In 2009, Ink was appointed as the new publisher for United Hemispheres. Ink's first issue of Hemispheres was placed on all United Airlines and United Express flights on March 1, 2009. On September 7, 2024, it was announced that the physical edition of Hemispheres magazine would be discontinued after 32 years although it would continue in a digital format.
