= Parsec (magazine) =

Parsec was a well-known Argentine science fiction magazine published in 1984. The founder was Sergio Gaut vel Hartman. The magazine existed between June and November 1984.

It presented authors as Mario Levrero, Robert Sheckley, George R. R. Martin, Fritz Leiber, Theodore Sturgeon, as well as the Argentine authors Angélica Gorodischer, Eduardo J. Carletti, Tarik Carson and Eduardo Abel Giménez.
