= TWX (magazine) =

Former US trade magazine

- Editor: William Gafford
- Categories: Trade magazine
- Frequency: Bi-monthly
- Circulation: 8,000
- Publisher: AT&T Corporation - Long Line Division
- First issue: June 1944
- Final issue: March 1952
- Company: AT&T Corporation
- Country: United States
- Based in: New Jersey
- Language: English

TWX was a trade magazine published by the Long Lines Department of AT&T Corporation. The magazine first appeared in June 1944 and was published sporadically, ceasing publication in March 1952 after 41 issues.

TWX magazine took its name from the Teletypewriter Exchange Service, which was developed by AT&T Corp. in 1931. The TWX service was sold to Western Union in 1969, but it remained an industry standard until 1981, when it was converted to the Telex II system.

Free subscriptions to TWX magazine were offered to companies that were using AT&T's equipment and services. As such, the content tended to focus less on the technical aspects of telegraph/Teletype operations and more on practical usage in an office environment. Each issue featured industry news, product evaluations, and testimonials from office managers extolling the virtues of the teletypewriter. Although most of the articles were published without a byline, some of the magazine's content has been attributed to science-fiction writer William Tenn, who was working as a technical editor for AT&T's Bell Labs at the time.

Although TWX magazine boasted a circulation of 8,000, most of that was due to its free circulation to AT&T's clients and partners. Few people actually read the magazine, and those that did accused it of being little more than "twenty pages of fluff and advertisements for products with a niche market at best". Although the TWX system itself remained viable for several decades, TWX magazine shut down in March 1952.

== See also ==
- Bell Labs Record
- Bell Labs Technical Journal
