= Newsweek Argentina =

Argentine monthly news magazine

- Editor-in-chief: Sergio Szpolski
- Categories: News
- Frequency: Monthly
- Publisher: Manucorp, S.A.
- Total circulation: 20,000 (2011)
- First issue: August 2, 2006; 20 years ago
- Country: Argentine
- Language: Rioplatense Spanish
- Website: Newsweek Argentina

Newsweek Argentina is an Argentine monthly news magazine, published as the local edition of Newsweek. Its editorial director was Alex Milberg, and its senior editor was Matías Loewy.

== History and profile ==
The magazine was inaugurated on August 2, 2006, and belonged to Sergio Szpolski's media group, Grupo Veintitrés'. Szpolski sold a 50% share therein to Matías Garfunkel.

The magazine included both articles and editorials written in the Argentine bureau located in Palermo, Buenos Aires, as well as translations from the namesake U.S. publication. Part of the magazine was also distributed as an in-flight magazine in Aerolíneas Argentinas and Austral Líneas Aéreas as a reprint within Cielos Argentinos.

Regular contributors included: Rosendo Fraga, Sergio Bergman, and Lucas Llach (Economics); Ana Gerschenson (Argentine politics); Juan Pablo de Santis (Business); Alejandro Zanoni (information technology); and Tamara di Tella (Argentine culture).

The magazine was closed in 2014, however, on June 30, 2022, the magazine was reintroduced as a second stage, this time under group Alpha Media's management.
