= House organ =

Employee magazine

The Silver Sheet, a house organ of Thomas H. Ince Studios in the early 1920s

A house organ (also variously known an in-house magazine, in-house publication, house journal, shop paper, plant paper, or employee magazine) is a magazine or periodical published by a company or organization for its customers, employees, union members, parishioners, political party members, and so forth. This name derives from the use of "organ" as referring to a periodical for a special interest group.

House organs typically come in two types, internal and external. An internal house organ is meant for consumption by the employees of the company as a channel of communication for the management. An external house organ is meant for consumption by the customers of the company, and may be either a free regular newsletter, or an actual commercial product in its own right.

Examples include inflight magazines and most university alumni magazines.

== History ==
Magazines during the industrial revolution were often organised informally without involvement from the company, and served many purposes, including literary & artistic, for advertising, and as a bulletin of employee-relevant information. Over time, some magazines received employer support or were created by the employer.

By the 1930s, staff journals became common in large organisations, created directly by companies, and were written for the entire organisation, rather than being targeted for a particular department or for technical workers. More banking sector magazines were launched after the World War One.

=== Pre-industrial revolution ===
The Fugger Newsletters (German: Fuggerzeitungen), were newsletters collected by brothers Octavian Secundus and Phillipp Edward Fugger of the Fugger Family between 1568 and 1605, and consisted of handwritten newsletter reports of political, military, social news and trade information from European cities. Over 15000 individual newsletters are in the collection. The writters of these newsletters were only occasionally directly employed by the Fuggers, and most newsletters were written independently.

=== Earlier informal employee-led publications ===
The Lowell Offering, published from 1840 to 1845, published poetry, fiction, essays, and other literary works from textile workers of Lowell, Massachusetts. Over time, it became broader in scope. Workers also discussed poor working conditions and labor unrest. It had hundreds of subscribers and supporters throughout New England and the United States. It later became subsidised by the mill owners.

The Great Western Railway Magazine was a magazine published first informally by employees of Great Western Railway from 1862 to 1864, then by the Great Western Temperance Society in 1888, before becoming an official publication in 1903. The GWR magazine served as a link between staff on the network, providing information about employee retirements, changes, and obituaries, and reports from GWR employee groups and societies, including sports clubs, horticultural societies, and musical groups.

=== Official internal magazines ===
Ibis, published by Prudential Assurance Company, first published in 1878, was intended for clerical workers at its head office. Prudential later created the Prudential Bulletin in 1920, which was more business oriented.
