= Spafax =

British travel media and in-flight entertainment company

- Industry: Travel media
- Founded: 1985; 41 years ago
- Headquarters: London, England, UK
- Parent: WPP plc
- Website: www.spafax.com

Spafax is a British travel media and in-flight entertainment company. It provides content curation, licensing, media sales, creative services and technology services for airlines and other travel-sector clients.

Founded in London in 1985, the company was acquired by WPP plc in 2000.

== History ==
Spafax was founded in London in 1985.

In September 2000, WPP announced that it had acquired Spafax Airline Network Limited from Pensa Ltd. WPP described the business at the time as an international provider of in-flight entertainment content.

In 2016, Spafax Content Marketing Americas and Forward Worldwide were merged to form Bookmark Content and Communications, a WPP-owned content and communications business within the wider Spafax group structure.

In 2019, Campaign reported that Spafax was among the subsidiaries housed under WPP's Tenthavenue division before that brand was retired as part of a restructuring. The report said the agencies themselves were unaffected by the change.

== Services ==
Spafax's business focuses on airline and travel media. According to the company and its parent WPP, its services include in-flight entertainment curation and licensing, content delivery and technology, airline media sales, and creative and content production for travel brands.

The company also operates internationally through offices in Europe, North America, South America, the Middle East and Asia.

== See also ==
- WPP plc
- In-flight entertainment
