= Cielos Argentinos =

Aerolíneas Argentinas inflight magazine

Cielos Argentinos is an Aerolíneas Argentinas magazine that incorporates material from Newsweek. It was started in 2009, and belongs to Sergio Szpolski's media group. The magazine is published by Editorial Group Veintitres.
