= Ink (company) =

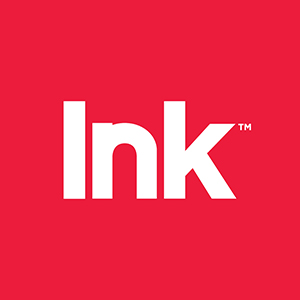
- Industry: Travel media Inflight magazines Trade publications
- Founded: 1994
- Founder: Michael Keating; Simon Leslie
- Headquarters: London, United Kingdom
- Number of employees: 420
- Website: www.ink-global.com

Ink, or Ink Global, is a travel media publishing and technology company founded in 1994. Based in London, Ink publishes 33 inflight magazines for 24 airlines worldwide.

== History ==
Ink was founded in London, in 1994, by Simon Leslie and Michael Keating to service two airlines in the Middle East and Africa. Initially based in Shoreditch, London, the company's headquarters moved to West Hampstead. As of 2019, Ink employs approximately 300 people globally.
