= Advanced Squad Leader Modules =

Modules for the game Advanced Squad Leader (ASL) contains all the equipment needed to actually play the game. There are 14 official "core" modules that contain the essential components for a complete order of battle of all major nationalities to participate in the Second World War. Ownership of all core modules is not a prerequisite to playing the game, and as few as one module can be used. In addition to core modules, other products are also available and may be loosely referred to as "modules", or in the more specific terms as Deluxe ASL Modules and Historical ASL Modules. These required previous ownership of some of the core modules in varying combinations, or at least the components of them (rules sections and counters, and sometimes mapboards).

Each module generally contains the complete order of battle for at least one nationality, including 1/2" counters depicting infantry squads, crews, and single man counters (SMCs) as well as infantry support weapons. Some modules expanded coverage with 5/8" counters depicting vehicles and ordnance. Those modules with vehicle and ordnance counters generally also contain pages for Chapter H of the ASL Rulebook, which gives detailed notes and information on each type of vehicle or piece of ordnance.

Some modules also contain chapters specific to certain theatres, such as North Africa or the Pacific, where special rules for nationality distinctions, terrain and weather are required.

When the Finnish module "Hakkaa Päälle" was released, Advanced Squad Leader became the first tactical level wargame in history to be able to portray the armies of every nationality that participated in hostilities in the Second World War.

== Core modules ==
=== Beyond Valor ===
This initial game features all system counters necessary for playing ASL, as well as the complete infantry, vehicle and ordnance counter mix for the Germans, Russians and Finns. (A new edition published by MMP many years later added the HASL Module "Red Barricades"). The scenarios were sometimes decried as lacklustre, and mainly centered on urban combat, in keeping with the four new mapboards issued with the game. Mapboard 1 from SL and mapboard 8 from GI were necessary to play four of the ten printed scenarios as well.

Scenarios: ASL1-ASL10 Scenarios (V.3): 123-136

A 2nd Edition included additional counters for rules added in Chapter E (which was included with the 2nd Edition Rulebook), as well as changing the colour scheme for Finnish counters, and included the otherwise out of print Red Barricades HASL module, including two mapsheets, informational counters, and rulebook Chapter O).

A 3rd Edition released in December 2005 contained 10 geomorphic mapboards (done in the lighter style of the ASLSK boards), being reprints of the original Squad Leader boards 1, 2, 3 and 4, a reprint of the Cross of Iron board 5, and a reprint of board 8 from GI: Anvil of Victory, as well as reprints of the original Beyond Valor mapboards 20, 21, 22, and 23. The game also included 20 ASL scenarios and 4 six-sided dice in addition to 13 sets of counters for the complete Russian and German order of battle as well as the main system counters.

=== Paratrooper ===
This game was the least expensive offering of the initial modules, containing a skeleton order of battle for United States parachute troops in Normandy and their German opponents, a small sampling of system markers, and just one mounted mapboard. The game was billed as a self-contained introductory module, and came with a rulebook chapter (Chapter K) written in conversational style that contained examples of play and a basic grounding in ASL rules for newcomers to the system. The chapter was written as a "basic training" story and included Days 1 to 6 (other days were released as part of other modules). Unfortunately, boards 1 to 4 from the original SL were still necessary to play all eight scenarios contained in the game, so either ownership of SL was required, or the boards had to be ordered separately by mail. Ownership of the ASL Rulebook was also a requirement.

Scenarios: ASL11-ASL18

A 2nd Edition deleted the Chapter K pages, as they became available with the 2nd Edition Rulebook, and added dice as well as boards 2 and 4, reissues of the boards from SL.

=== Yanks ===
After the disappointment among SL fans when GI: Anvil of Victory contained no Design Your Own (DYO) unit purchase values for American forces, the third module of Yanks made up for this, for those who could afford the steep cost of this module, which had both the ASL Rulebook and Beyond Valor as prerequisites, as well as board 2 from SL, board 7 from COD and board 12 from GI (if one wanted to play the preprinted scenarios). The entire order of battle for US forces in Europe (and North Africa) was included, along with Chapter E which contained "miscellaneous" rules for amphibious landings, night fighting, air support, weather, parachute drops, glider landings, boats, convoys, swimming, ammunition vehicles, and special barrage rules for OBA (Off Board Artillery). Unfortunately, for those not interested in US forces, Chapter E would have to be purchased separately by mail order if one wanted to simulate any of these aspects with any of the other nationalities (and many printed scenarios in future modules would in fact have ownership of Chapter E a prerequisite.) Chapter H pages for US forces were also included (with DYO values and special vehicle notes describing any special in-game characteristics for each vehicle and ordnance type, as well as a brief history of each). Note that only European and North African theatre forces were included, not US forces from the Pacific theatre.

Scenarios: ASL19-ASL26

=== Partisan! ===
Partisan! also required the ASL Rulebook, boards 1, 2, 3 and 4 from SL, and Beyond Valor as prerequisites to play the printed scenarios, as well as providing some counters for "Partisan" or irregular forces that could represent western European Resistance members, Yugoslavian guerrillas, or Soviet partisan troops. These partisan counters were already provided in the Beyond Valor module. The countersheet provided in Partisan! mostly gave infantry forces for Axis Minor nations (see Armies of Oblivion below) omitting any heavy weapons. A redo of board 10 from the original Rogue Series boards was included in this module, with the new artwork up to the usual high standards of the mounted mapboards of every game in the series to date, as well as a brand new board.

Scenarios: ASL27-ASL34

=== West of Alamein ===
West of Alamein brought the complete order of battle for British forces to ASL, and unlike COD/GI covered the entire war, both British and US manufactured vehicles and weapons. However, the scenarios focused on North Africa, and five new mapboards as well as a large number of cardboard terrain overlays were included, along with Chapter F with several pages of special rules for simulating combat in a desert environment. Only one printed scenario included with the game required a board from a previous module (Yanks) in order to play (as well as the Chapter E rules for parachute landings), though both the rulebook and Beyond Valor were prerequisites. The module was popular for the new terrain types it brought to the game, many veteran players describing this as the "long awaited desert module." Chapter H pages for British forces were also included (with DYO values and special vehicle notes describing any special in-game characteristics for each vehicle and ordnance type, as well as a brief history of each).

Scenarios: ASL35-ASL42

Overlays: "D1-D6", "E1", "H1-H6", "S1-S8", "SD1-SD8", "W1-W4", "X1-X5".

A proposed 2nd Edition was meant to reorganize the content of this module. The 2nd Edition was to contain Chapter F for the rulebook, associated information counters, and the 5 mapboards contained in the 1st Edition. "For King and Country" replaced this 2nd edition.

=== The Last Hurrah ===
The Last Hurrah brought a complete set of infantry counters for the so-called "Allied Minor" nationalities to generically represent soldiers from Poland, Norway, Belgium, The Netherlands, Greece, and some Yugoslavian forces. Prerequisites for the printed scenarios included with this module included the rulebook, Beyond Valor, and boards 2, 3 and 4 from SL. Also necessary for two of the scenarios (and not mentioned on the original packaging) was Yanks, or at the least, Chapter E which was included in that module. Another of the Rogue boards was re-released, again with updated artwork to ASL standards, as well as a new board. The third mapboard in the game was a new offering. Some unique matchups were included in the scenarios, including Polish cavalry versus German armoured cars and tanks, Yugoslavian cavalry versus German motorcycles, and Polish cavalry versus Russian armoured cars.

Scenarios: ASL43-ASL50

The module was reviewed in Volume 2, Number 15 of Wargamer (Sep-Oct 1989); Ted Bleck considered the game to be up to the usual high standards as far as components went (beautiful mounted mapboards as well as accurately printed and cut counters, easy to read and easy to separate from the "trees") but expressed disappointment at the focus of the module. No vehicles or ordnance were included (restricting play of the Allied Minors to just infantry/cavalry actions). The scenarios included were deemed to be "small by ASL standards" but fun and well balanced.

The 2nd Edition also included board 3 from the original Squad Leader series.

=== Hollow Legions ===
Hollow Legions contained a wealth of exclusively new materials unseen in the Squad Leader/ASL world before. The entire order of battle for the much-maligned Italian Army was included (along with the applicable Chapter H pages providing DYO values and special vehicle notes describing any special in-game characteristics for each vehicle and ordnance type, as well as a brief history of each). Two new desert boards were provided, and prerequisites for playing the scenarios were extensive, including the rulebook, Beyond Valor, West of Alamein, and Yanks, as well as board 4 from SL, board 7 from COD and board 12 from GI. A great variety of forces made up the scenarios, however, in addition to the varied terrain, with Italian forces variously fighting against British, American, Russian and German troops.

Scenarios: ASL51-ASL58

=== Code of Bushido ===
Code of Bushido was another departure for the ASL system, taking players for the first time to the Pacific Theatre of Operations (PTO).

The entire order of battle for the Japanese Army was included (along with the applicable Chapter H pages providing DYO values and special vehicle notes describing any special in-game characteristics for each vehicle and ordnance type, as well as a brief history of each). The first half of Chapter G was also included, introducing many special rules for the Japanese, as well as Pacific Theatre terrain. Four new boards were provided, representing mainly jungle terrain though using standard mapboard symbology from previous maps. Special rules converted woods to jungle, buildings to huts, etc. An extensive set of terrain overlays was also provided, much like the desert overlays in the West of Alamein module. Prerequisites for this game included the rulebook, Beyond Valor, Yanks, and West of Alamein as well as board 2 from SL. The US forces in the scenarios provided were representative of US Army units and thus no special counters or rules were needed, though the majority of scenarios dealt with Japanese troops fighting Russian, British, and Philippine partisan troops with only two situations involving American forces.

Scenarios: ASL59-ASL66

Overlays: "1-5", "B1-B5", "G1-G5", "M1-M5", "O1-O5", "RP1-RP5", "Wd1-Wd5", "X6".

In September 2013, this module was replaced by Rising Sun.

=== Gung Ho! ===
By the time Gung Ho! was released, no serious player of ASL could deny that the system had become a highly complex and detailed game system that retained little of the playability of the original Squad Leader. Gung Ho introduced a complete order of battle for both Chinese forces and the United States Marine Corps, along with the applicable Chapter H pages providing DYO values and special vehicle notes describing any special in-game characteristics for each Chinese vehicle and ordnance type, as well as a brief history of each, and also notes on amphibious craft as used by both sides in the Pacific. For anyone who had bought all the modules to date, they found that their rulebook was overflowing, with Chapter H alone having 112 pages. The second half of Chapter G was included, with special rules for amphibious operations, beach and ocean terrain (as well as more terrain overlays to help simulate these), tropical climate rules, new fortification types, and even rules for bulldozers. Prerequisites for this game included the rulebook, Beyond Valor, Yanks, West of Alamein, and Code of Bushido, as well as board 2 from SL.

Scenarios: ASL67-ASL74

Overlays: "Be1-Be7", "Ef1-Ef3", "OC1-OC4", "P1-P5".

In September 2013, this module was replaced by Rising Sun.

=== Croix de Guerre ===
Croix de Guerre provided the complete order of battle for French forces in 1939-40, as well as Vichy French troops, as well as their vehicles and ordnance (along with the applicable Chapter H pages providing DYO values and special vehicle notes describing any special in-game characteristics for each vehicle and ordnance type, as well as a brief history of each). Eight revised pages for the 1st Edition rulebook were also included with the game as well as a sheet of additional terrain overlays. Prerequisites for this game included the rulebook, Beyond Valor, Yanks, West of Alamein, and boards 2 and 4 from SL

Scenarios: ASL75-ASL82

Overlays: "OG1-OG5", "St1-St3", "X7-X18"

=== Doomed Battalions ===
Doomed Battalions was the last module published by Avalon Hill before the purchase by Hasbro, and expanded the earlier coverage of the Allied Minor nationalities in The Last Hurrah by providing their vehicles and ordnance (along with the applicable Chapter H pages providing DYO values and special vehicle notes describing any special in-game characteristics for each vehicle and ordnance type, as well as a brief history of each). A rerelease of the Rogue board 9 with improved artwork was accompanied by two brand new boards, as well as more terrain overlays. Twelve revised rulebook pages for the 1st Edition rulebook were also included. Prerequisites for playing the included scenarios were the rulebook, Beyond Valor, The Last Hurrah, Hollow Legions, and Yanks, as well as boards 42 and 43 (only available by separate purchase through MMP who was selling these bundled with a set of new scenarios), board 32 from Partisan, and boards 2 and 3 from SL.

Scenarios: ASL83-ASL90

Overlays: "RR1-RR14", "X19-X24", "OW1"

2nd Edition is a bit of a misnomer; a small print run was made by Avalon Hill before MMP took over the franchise. A reissue of the module by MMP was made very quickly, but the rules chapters of this so-called "2nd Edition" of DB were compatible with the 1st Edition ASL Rulebook, not the 2nd.

=== For King and Country ===
For King and Country was released, chronologically, after Doomed Battalions and is a reissue of material originally found in West of Alamein. The British order of battle has been split with the new 2nd edition of West of Alamein, which will include only desert terrain and rules, with King and Country containing the order of battle for British/Commonwealth forces. Included in this module are rereleases of mapboard 1 from SL, board 7 from COD, and boards 8 and 12 from GI. The Chapter H pages for the British are included in this module, and 20 scenarios round out the contents. The decision by MMP not to reprint the earlier SL/COI/COD/GI games no doubt prompted the decision to reissue these boards, which would otherwise be available only through special order. In order to play all included scenarios, however, prerequisites include the rulebook and Beyond Valor as well as mapboards 2, 3 and 4 from SL, board 5 from COI, board 6 from COD, boards 13 and 14 from GI, board 9 from Doomed Battalions, board 10 from Partisan (also not being reprinted), and boards 11 and 33 from The Last Hurrah.

- ASL 91-110 - these scenarios are actually reworkings of older scenarios; some from the ASL Annual and a number from a magazine called Backblast which only had a two issue run in 1994. The magazine was developed by several Avalon Hill playtesters, who formed their own organization called Multi-Man Publishing which later, of course, went on to acquire the rights to ASL. The group included Steve Petersen, Brian Youse, and Perry Cocke.
- ASL91 - "Ad Hoc at Beaurains" - rework of scenario A40 from ASL Annual 92, itself an update of Squad Leader scenario 30 (COD)
- ASL92 - "Stand Fast the Guards" - rework of scenario A15 from ASL Annual 90
- ASL93 - "Tavronitis Bridge" - rework of scenario A1 from ASL Annual 89
- ASL94 - "Bofors Bashing" - rework of scenario A2 from ASL Annual 89
- ASL95 - "Descent into Hell" - rework of scenario A3 from ASL Annual 89
- ASL96 - "The Crux of Calais" - rework of scenario A22 from ASL Annual 90
- ASL97 - "A Desperate Affair" - rework of scenario BB4 from Backblast
- ASL98 - "On Silent Wings" - rework of scenario A102 from ASL Annual 96
- ASL99 - "Probing Layforce" - rework of scenario A43 from ASL Annual 92
- ASL100 - "Regalbuto Ridge" - rework of scenario A24 from ASL Annual 90
- ASL101 - "Throwing Down the Gauntlet" - rework of scenario BB2 from Backblast
- ASL102 - "Point of the Sword" - rework of scenario BB3 from Backblast
- ASL103 - "A Day by the Shore" - rework of scenario G22 from The General
- ASL104 - "Hill of Death" - rework of scenario G36 from The General
- ASL105 - "Going to Church" - rework of scenario BB5 from Backblast
- ASL106 - "Kangaroo Hop" - rework of scenario G43 from The General
- ASL107 - "Tettau's Attack" - rework of scenario A33 from ASL Annual 91
- ASL108 - "Guards Attack" - rework of scenario A35 from ASL Annual 91
- ASL109 - "Dreil Team" - rework of scenario A37 from ASL Annual 91
- ASL110 - "North Bank" - rework of scenario A38 from ASL Annual 91

=== Armies of Oblivion ===
Armies of Oblivion expands the earlier coverage of the Axis Minor nationalities by providing their vehicles and ordnance (along with the applicable Chapter H pages providing DYO values and special vehicle notes describing any special in-game characteristics for each vehicle and ordnance type, as well as a brief history of each). Also included are reprinted counters from the out-of-print Partisan! module and four new mapboards, as well as terrain overlays. The project had long been in development; the 1993b edition of the ASL Annual referred to this project as March to Oblivion and projected a late 1994 release date.

The Axis Minor nationalities include:

- Bulgaria
- Croatia
- Hungary
- Romania
- Slovakia

Hungarian forces were provided in a two-colour scheme so as to distinguish them from other nations, such as Romania, whom they fought during the war, and to allow integration with German counters. Of all the SL and ASL games, gamettes and modules, Armies of Oblivion had perhaps the longest and most dubious history.

An article in the Sep-Oct 2004 issue of View From the Trenches (a long running third-party publication for ASL begun in the UK in March 1995 and still in bi-monthly publication) listed the progress of this module.

   January 1996 - Shortly after Multi-Man Publishing (MMP) acquired the rights to oversee development of ASL products, Brian Youse declared a "strong desire to finish the game system and
                  get out the Allied/Axis Minor Armour and Ordnance."
   November 1996 - Brian Youse comments that Armies of Oblivion (AOO) is put on the back burner until at least 1998.
   January 1997 - AOO details are announced; game will include 4 boards, 16 scenarios, and both Allied and Axis counters
   May 1997 - playtesting commences, no confirmation if one module or two will be released
   September 1997 - it is announced that AOO will be split into two modules, the first to be published in September 1998
   March 1998 - Doomed Battalions (DB) announced for a summer release with AOO expected to follow in 1999
   September 1998 - Avalon Hill is sold, DB released
   March 1999 - MMP announces 1999 schedule, AOO is not on it
   January 2000 - AOO expected to be released before a product called "Intro ASL", sometime in the last half of 2001
   July 2000 - boards 48, 49 and 50 are released for separate sale but testing of AOO continues
   September 2000 - MMP confident of Christmas release of AOO
   November 2000 - release of AOO now expected to be in the first quarter of 2001
   September 2001 - AOO scheduled for release in 2002
   January 2002 - public information points lengthy playtesting delaying release of AOO
   March 2002 - counter and rules artwork nearing completion
   September 2002 - Curt Schilling makes public statement that AOO "is less than one year away"
   January 2003 - MMP announced desire to release AOO by October; 10 scenarios completed with two to six more required
   May 2003 - MMP reports one scenario left to complete along with counter layout and vehicle notes
   November 2003 - AOO goes on pre-order
   March 2004 - AOO due to be printed soon according to MMP
   May 2004 - MMP announces final layout to be done soon

Armies of Oblivion was released in January 2006.

=== Rising Sun ===
Rising Sun was released in September, 2013, combining the elements of Code of Bushido and Gung Ho! into a single module.

=== Hakkaa Päälle ===
Finnish Module released in 2015.

Includes 3 new squad types, new vehicles, 16 scenarios, several replacement rules pages and board 52 in 'Starter Kit' style.

=== Forgotten War ===
Korean War Module released in 2017.

Includes several new squad types, new vehicles, 16 scenarios, chapter W (Korean War), and new boards. Rules added include Other UN Command forces and Korean War Terrain.

== ASL Action Packs ==
ASL Action Packs (AP) are published by MMP. They include new scenarios and boards. They do not contain new rules or counters, with the exception of AP 2 and AP 4 which have new rule pages inserts.

=== Action Pack 1 ===
Contains boards 42 and 43; OBA Flowchart 1st Edition; AP Scenarios 1-8.

=== Action Pack 2 ===
Contains boards 46 and 47; 2 Sheets overlays; 4 Pages Chapter B 1st Edition; Overrun Flowchart 1st Edition

=== Action Pack 3: Few Returned ===
Few Returned is a scenario bundle featuring the Italians. The scenarios represent the Eastern Front fighting the Soviets and in Italy fighting Germany. Researched and designed by Mark Pitcavage. Contains 12 Italian ASL scenarios (9 on the East Front; 3 in Italy) and 3 ASL 'starter kit-style' geomorphic mapboards (24, 42, and 43).

=== Action Pack 4: Normandy ===
Normandy is a scenario bundle featuring battles set in Normandy after D-Day. Contains 3 ASL geomorphic mapboards (53, 54, and 55), 12 ASL scenarios featuring the new maps, and 2 errata pages for the ASL Rulebook.

=== Action Pack 5: East Front ===
East Front features scenarios involving German, Russian, and Axis Minor forces between 1941 and 1945. Contains 12 ASL scenarios and 3 ASL geomorphic mapboards (56,57,58).

=== Action Pack 6: A Decade Of War 1936-1945 ===
Covering nearly 10 years of world-wide conflict. Contains 10 ASL scenarios (AP53-62) and 3 ASL double-sided geomorphic mapboards (1a/b,2a/b,3a/b).

=== Action Pack 7 ===
Contains 10 ASL scenarios (AP63-72) and 3 ASL geomorphic mapboards (60,61,62).

=== Action Pack 8: Roads Through Rome ===
Contains 10 ASL scenarios (AP73-82) and 3 ASL double-sided 11"x16" geomorphic mapboards (4a/b, 5a/b, 6a/b). Additionally, The Australian Balancing System (ABS) is presented as an option for the included scenarios.

=== Action Pack 9: To The Bridge! ===
Contains 10 ASL scenarios (AP83-92) and 3 ASL double-sided 11"x16" geomorphic mapboards (7a/b, 8a/b, 9a/b). Additionally, The Australian Balancing System (ABS) is presented as an option for the included scenarios.

=== Action Pack 10 ===
Contains boards #69 and #70 and eight scenarios(AP93-100)

=== Action Pack 11: 29 Let's Go! ===
Contains boards #71 and #72, one sheet of overlays and ten scenarios (AP101-110).

=== Action Pack 12: Oktoberfest XXX ===
Contains board #73 and #72 and ten scenarios(AP111-120).
