= Advanced Squad Leader =

Tactical-level board wargame

- Advanced Squad Leader 2nd Edition Rulebook
- Designers: Don Greenwood
- Publishers: Avalon Hill; Multi-Man Publishing
- Years active: 1985–present
- Players: 2
- Playing time: 360+ minutes
- Website: www.multimanpublishing.com

Advanced Squad Leader (ASL) is a tactical-level board wargame, originally marketed by Avalon Hill Games, that simulates actions of squad sized units in World War II. It is a detailed game system for two or more players (with solitary play also possible). Components include the ASL Rulebook and various games called modules. ASL modules provide the standard equipment for playing ASL, including geomorphic mapboards and counters. The mapboards are divided into hexagons to regulate fire and movement, and depict generic terrain that can represent different historical locations. The counters are cardboard pieces that depict squads of soldiers, crews, individual leaders, support weapons, heavy weapons, and vehicles.

Combined with the sales of the original Squad Leader, Advanced Squad Leader sold over 1 million copies by 1997.

== Introduction ==
Fifteen core modules provide representations of nearly every troop type, vehicle, and weapon to see combat action from any nationality involved in World War II. Each module comes with 6 to 20 researched scenarios depicting historical battles. These scenarios are printed on card stock with specifications of game length, map board configuration, counters involved, special rules for the conditions of the particular battle such as weather, and victory conditions. In addition to the scenarios published in the modules, there are numerous other sources for scenarios, both official and unofficial. There is also a detailed set of instructions in the ASL Rulebook for Design Your Own (DYO) scenarios based on a point-purchase system.

Additional variations on ASL include Deluxe ASL (DASL), which was a short-lived experiment in fusing miniature wargaming with ASL; Historical ASL (HASL), which used historically accurate maps, usually in a campaign setting where the outcome of one scenario affected the setup of following scenarios; Solitaire ASL (SASL) with many rules changes for fog of war and command to enhance solitaire play; and the ASL Starter Kits (ASLSK), a series of stand-alone introductory kits.

The game was first published by Avalon Hill in 1985 as a successor to the award-winning Squad Leader series, on which the game is based and from which the rules and components were directly developed. By the time the fourth and final installment of Squad Leader debuted, there were four separate rulebooks in existence with poorly integrated and sometimes contradictory rules. For example, U.S. forces had lower morale and were therefore disadvantaged by the use of morale ratings to determine the ability to push ordnance through snow or mud, even though there is no real reason for morale to affect such an attempt. It was clear that the system had grown in ways never dreamed of in 1977; large amounts of "nutmail" to Avalon Hill convinced the developers of the need to streamline the rules.

== ASL ==
Avalon Hill had originally promised a new rulebook streamlining procedures, eliminating redundancies, and possibly revising the "To Hit/To Kill" system used to simulate armor protection and penetration in tank combat. Instead, by the time it debuted, Advanced Squad Leader had become a complete replacement of the games of the original SL series. As an example, the original SL has only twelve different tank and assault gun types, and only five different armor ratings, from -2 to +2. By contrast, ASL has separate counters for 56 different types of tanks and assault guns for the Germans alone, with armor values from 0 to 26, based on actual thickness and degree of slope. Beyond Valor includes 99 separate German vehicles simulated in the game, including halftracks, armored cars, anti-aircraft vehicles, and soft skins.

Many fans of the original Squad Leader game who had looked forward to improvements to the system with the release of Advanced Squad Leader were taken aback by the need to replace the four modules they had bought; only the map boards of the earlier series were compatible with the new game.

The new game requires at least two products, the Advanced Squad Leader Rulebook and an initial module, either Beyond Valor, which contains a brand new counter mix for the German, Russian and Finnish armies, as well as all necessary system counters, or else Paratrooper, which contains a limited counter mix for system markers, US paratrooper units and their German opponents in Normandy. Either initial module also requires ownership of boards from SL in order to play the included scenarios.

The new game does not feature programmed instruction, instead of requiring a thorough reading of at least four chapters of the ASL Rulebook to play a game with ordnance and/or vehicles in it. Even the most basic ASL components were no longer introductory in nature, although Paratrooper masqueraded as such. (This would be redressed in 2004 by the introduction of ASL Starter Kits). Avalon Hill actually suggested that anyone wishing to play ASL also purchase the original Squad Leader and gain experience with that system first, and kept the original SL and three gamettes in print. The necessity of owning boards from these modules in order to play printed scenarios in the core modules of ASL may also have been a factor in this decision. So while ASL was intended to replace SL, there was a certain ambiguity for many years about the status of SL's replacement; the original game was still necessary as a stepping stone to learning ASL, and a source for needed map boards.

ASL was the first of Avalon Hill's 'advanced' games (the others were Advanced Civilization and Advanced Third Reich).

In 1998 Monarch Avalon, Inc. sold its entire line of games to Hasbro. On January 15, 1999, Multi-Man Publishing, LLC (MMP) announced an exclusive association with Hasbro, Inc. "to develop, produce, and distribute games and other products for Avalon Hill's Advanced Squad Leader (ASL) game system." MMP is a gaming company founded in 1994 by Perry Cocke and Brian Youse, and later co-partner Curt Schilling, to preserve ASL and other Avalon Hill games. Multi-Man Publishing made many changes to the new system; a decision not to reprint the earlier Squad Leader games resulted in reorganization and 2nd editions of many ASL core modules in order to include boards from the earlier games, necessary for play of the printed scenarios in those core modules.

Playtester Jon Mishcon described the new game rather more succinctly in Volume 21, Number 5 of The General Magazine, in relation to Squad Leader; he wrote that the game was "Closely akin to SL but NOT the same." ASL took longer to play, punished use of "cheats" that worked in the old game system (one example was flooding an isolated defending unit by moving multiple units towards him; in ASL, units could fire more than once at moving targets in certain situations, which was impossible in the original SL), and emphasized realism over playability. He clarified that while playability had in many cases increased with the organization of the new rules, there were still many "special" circumstances that called for special rules. The new rules did, however, have a very strong systemic approach whereby, in his words, you could

learn a concept and it applies, with varying D (ice) R (oll) M (odifiers), in all similar situations. This makes the game easier to learn and play. The rules make more sense. Most of the old 'funny' rules that allowed 'cute' tricks have been deleted. Mostly, I guess, it's a distillation of the best of SL....In short, there's a lot less crapping around in the rules. Most importantly, the vast majority of the rules really will tend to benefit the player who thinks as did his historical counterpart. (Sigh, an end to our torching most of the map board.)

In that same issue of The General, Don Greenwood - developer of ASL and also editor of the magazine - responded to harsh criticism by consumers who felt that the redesign of the system was a cash-grab, or worse, a betrayal.

The SL game system, for all its acclaim...was based on a flawed foundation. The subsequent gamettes, in building on that start, only complicated matters by attempting to patch that foundation rather than replace it altogether....here's how I rationalize it. A few years ago, ...I was so enamored by (video cassette recorders) that I just had to have one. Two years later they were selling models for half the price with twice the features which mine had. Sometimes I regret buying that VCR so soon, but then I recall all the fun I had with it when it was new and eventually concluded that my money was well spent after all.

Despite the price tag and the expensive lists of prerequisites for each new module, the game system caught on and new modules continued to be produced twenty-five years after the original release - joining Dungeons & Dragons and Star Fleet Battles as one of what were known as "The Big Three" games of the hobbyist game industry. A large and active worldwide hobby community thrives around ASL, including tournaments, community websites, clubs, and fanzines. An active trading and auction community enables participants to buy and sell used ASL modules. ASL can be played over the Internet using a system called Virtual Advanced Squad Leader (VASL), using the "Vassal" game engine designed by Rodney Kinney. This is a Java-based application that allows for real-time input by one or more participants/observers who can manipulate graphical representations of map boards and counters, including random dice rolls, LOS checking, chart consultation and all the necessary administrative tasks to play a full game of ASL.

A number of third-party developers also continue to publish modules and scenarios for ASL.

=== ASL rulebook ===
The ASL Rulebook was reformatted away from the traditional Avalon Hill format used in their smaller games. The ASL Rulebook was modeled after Amarillo Design Bureau's Star Fleet Battles rulebook, a format that better supported the "massive" game that ASL had become. Based on military field manuals, the rule book was contained in a three-ring binder. Each chapter was color-coded along the top of the page, with brightly colored section dividers of heavy cardboard stock reproducing charts and diagrams associated with that chapter. Errata would be provided on a regular basis, and coupons in the back of the rulebook could be exchanged by mail for the initial updates to the rulebook. The errata would come in the form of altered pages, with page numbers annotated with the date of any changes; old pages were simply removed from the binder and discarded and the new page inserted. The two largest updates were the '87 and '89 sections that came with many pages. The first edition rules shipped with Chapter A, B, C, D, H, J, and N. Chapter N was a visual inventory of all game pieces included in Beyond Valor and several follow up modules but was not fully supported. While early modules did contain the appropriate Chapter N pages, some modules did not have the pages included immediately (Paratrooper's Chapter N pages, for example, were not provided until the release of Yanks). HASL modules did not have associated Chapter N pages, and neither did Doomed Battalions.

First Edition Rulebook Chapters
Chapter	Contents	Sold as part of	Pages
Chapter A	Infantry and Basic Game Rules	ASL Rulebook	
Chapter B	Terrain Rules	ASL Rulebook	
Chapter C	Ordnance and Offboard Artillery	ASL Rulebook	
Chapter D	Vehicles	ASL Rulebook	
Chapter E	Miscellaneous	Yanks	
Chapter F	North Africa	West of Alamein	
Chapter G	Pacific Theatre	Code of Bushido	1–18
Chapter G	Pacific Theatre	Gung Ho!	18–42
Chapter H	Design Your Own	ASL Rulebook	1–30
Chapter H	Design Your Own	Yanks	31–48
Chapter H	Design Your Own	West of Alamein	49–76
Chapter H	Design Your Own	Hollow Legions	77–88
Chapter H	Design Your Own	Code of Bushido	89–100
Chapter H	Design Your Own	Gung Ho!	101–112
Chapter H	Design Your Own	Croix de Guerre	113–130
Chapter H	Design Your Own	Doomed Battalions	131–142
Chapter H	Design Your Own	Armies of Oblivion	143–172
Chapter I	Campaign	Never released	
Chapter J	Deluxe ASL	ASL Rulebook	
Chapter K	Squad Leader Training Manual	Paratrooper	1–24
Chapter K	Squad Leader Training Manual	Pegasus Bridge	25–32
Chapter K	Squad Leader Training Manual	ASL Journal 2	33–43
Chapter L	Postal ASL		
Chapter M	ASL Analysis		
Chapter N	ASL Armory	Beyond Valor	1–6
Chapter N	ASL Armory	Yanks	7–10
Chapter N	ASL Armory	West of Alamein	11–14
Chapter N	ASL Armory	Hollow Legions	15–16
Chapter N	ASL Armory	Code of Bushido	17–18
Chapter N	ASL Armory	Gung Ho!	19–20
Chapter N	ASL Armory	Croix de Guerre	21–22
Chapter O	Red Barricades HASL	Red Barricades	
Chapter P	Kampfgruppe Peiper	KGP I	
Chapter P	Kampfgruppe Peiper	KGP II (updates to KGP I - stylized as "KGP 2")	
Chapter Q	Pegasus Bridge	Pegasus Bridge	
Chapter R	A Bridge Too Far	A Bridge Too Far	
Chapter S	Solitaire ASL	Solitaire ASL	
Chapter T	Blood Reef: Tarawa	Blood Reef: Tarawa	
Chapter W	Korean War	Korean War	
Chapter V	Valor of the Guards	Valor of the Guards	

The rules themselves were heavily streamlined, as promised, though many more procedures were introduced to the game, increasing complexity and playing time (as well as the likelihood of rules arguments). The modelling of infantry weapons was overhauled to prevent unrealistic tactics, and machineguns and ordnance were given variable rates of fire (in other words, the ability to fire more than once per phase, with a certain unpredictability as to how many times worked in). Squads equipped only with small arms now had many options to reflect weapons types; semi-automatic and automatic weapons could be simulated with rules for Spraying Fire or Assault Fire, for example.

Above all, the use of standardized abbreviations and jargon made the rules very technical in outlook; this language is known as "legalese" and is in contrast to more "conversational" types of rules. The debate of the merits of both approaches went as far back as the original Squad Leader rulebook written by John Hill and Don Greenwood. ASL came down firmly on the side of "legalese", though not coincidentally Don Greenwood was the driving force behind ASL with John Hill having moved on to other projects after the original SL.

A 2nd Edition Rulebook was introduced by Multi-Man Publishing in early 2001, combining all previous errata and including updates to Chapters A, B, C, D, H (German/Russian), and J as well as Chapter E (previously available only with the Yanks module) and Chapter K Days 1-8 (previously available only with the Paratrooper Module (Days 1-6), Pegasus Bridge HASL Module (Day 7) and ASL Journal #2 (Day 8)).

All Historical ASL Module rules associated with Historical Study Modules and the ASL Journal were incorporated into a new Chapter Z.

MMP Rulebook Chapter Z
Rules Pages	Rules for:	Sold as part of:
1-2	Kakazu Ridge	ASL Journal 2
3-20	Edson's Ridge Mini-CG	Operation Watchtower
21-38	Riley's Road CG	Operation Veritable
39 - 58	Primosole Bridge CG	ASL Journal 6
59 - 62	Singling CG	Operations Special Edition #1
63 - 78	Suicide Creek CG	ASL Journal 9
79 - 84	Gavutu-Tanambogo Mini-CG	Rising Sun

Chapter N is no longer supported in the 2nd Edition ASL Rulebook, and all Chapter N pages have been deleted from reprinted modules. The new rulebook also includes (minor) material not covered in any previous issue of errata, making ownership of the 2nd Edition essential for compatibility with new products or other players who use the 2nd Edition. The 2nd Edition does reflect most, but not all, previous changes to the rules via an issue of replacement pages. There are also cosmetic differences such as larger typeface and improved layout.

=== Unique elements ===
Perhaps one of the most unusual elements of the ASL system is the use of dice. While using two dice to obtain a bell curve result between 2 and 12 (36 possible outcomes) is not unique to ASL, there are many other ways in which the dice are used. One die is a "colored" die, so that when two dice are rolled, not only will the sum of both dice be used (for example, an attack by a machinegun on an enemy unit will have the result of two dice cross-referenced on the Infantry Fire Table (IFT)), but other results may also be achieved simultaneously. (To continue the example, if the colored die is equal or less to a printed Rate of Fire (ROF) number given for the machinegun, it may fire again in that phase). Comparing the results of the two dice to each other will also create simultaneous results; so while the sum of the dice will be used on the IFT, two sixes (a natural 12) will result in the machinegun suffering a stoppage. If the roll was for an attack by an infantry squad, identical results on both dice would result in "cowering" and a different column on the IFT would be consulted with the dice roll. Double ones will result in a Critical Hit if rolling for an ordnance weapon "To Hit" an enemy target. As well, ASL gives each side in most scenarios a Sniper Activation Number (SAN) that will activate a random sniper attack whenever one side rolls the other's SAN for any purpose during gameplay. The dice thus feature heavily in gameplay providing multiple random events every time they are rolled.

=== ASL modules ===
The following is a list of Advanced Squad Leader Modules, and the dates of their release. There were complex prerequisites for just about all modules after the release of Beyond Valor and Paratrooper, and 2nd Editions of most of the following have reorganized the map boards and rules chapters released with each. Specifically, a re-release of boards 1 to 4 has been necessary given MMPs decision not to reprint the original Squad Leader game and its three gamettes.

- 1—Beyond Valor (1985)
- 2—Paratrooper (1986)
- 3—Yanks (1987)
- 3a-Yanks (2016 reprint)
- 4—Partisan! (1987)
- 5—West of Alamein (1988)
- 5a—For King and Country (2004)
- 6—The Last Hurrah (1988)
- 7—Hollow Legions (1989)
- 8—Code of Bushido (1990)
- 9—Gung Ho! (1991)
- 10—Croix de Guerre (1992)
- 10a—Croix de Guerre (2020)
- 11—Doomed Battalions (1998)
- 12—Armies of Oblivion (2006)
- 13—Rising Sun (2013)
- 14—Hakkaa Päälle (2015)
- 15—Forgotten War (2017)

The original Avalon Hill West of Alamein module originally contained the entire British/Commonwealth order of battle; reprintings by MMP have reorganized the content, splitting the original WOA content into two modules, a 2nd Edition West of Alamein, and a new For King and Country module.

==== ASL module prerequisites ====
A tremendous strength in the ASL system is its flexibility. Most tactical situations from Second World War history can be recreated using the components of the game system. However, special rules, maps, or map overlays may be required in order to properly portray these situations. ASL modules usually have dependencies on one or more previous module(s) (in other words, use of the material in one module is dependent on ownership of another). Very few modules can be played in isolation.

The following images illustrate the prerequisites (click on image for full-size)

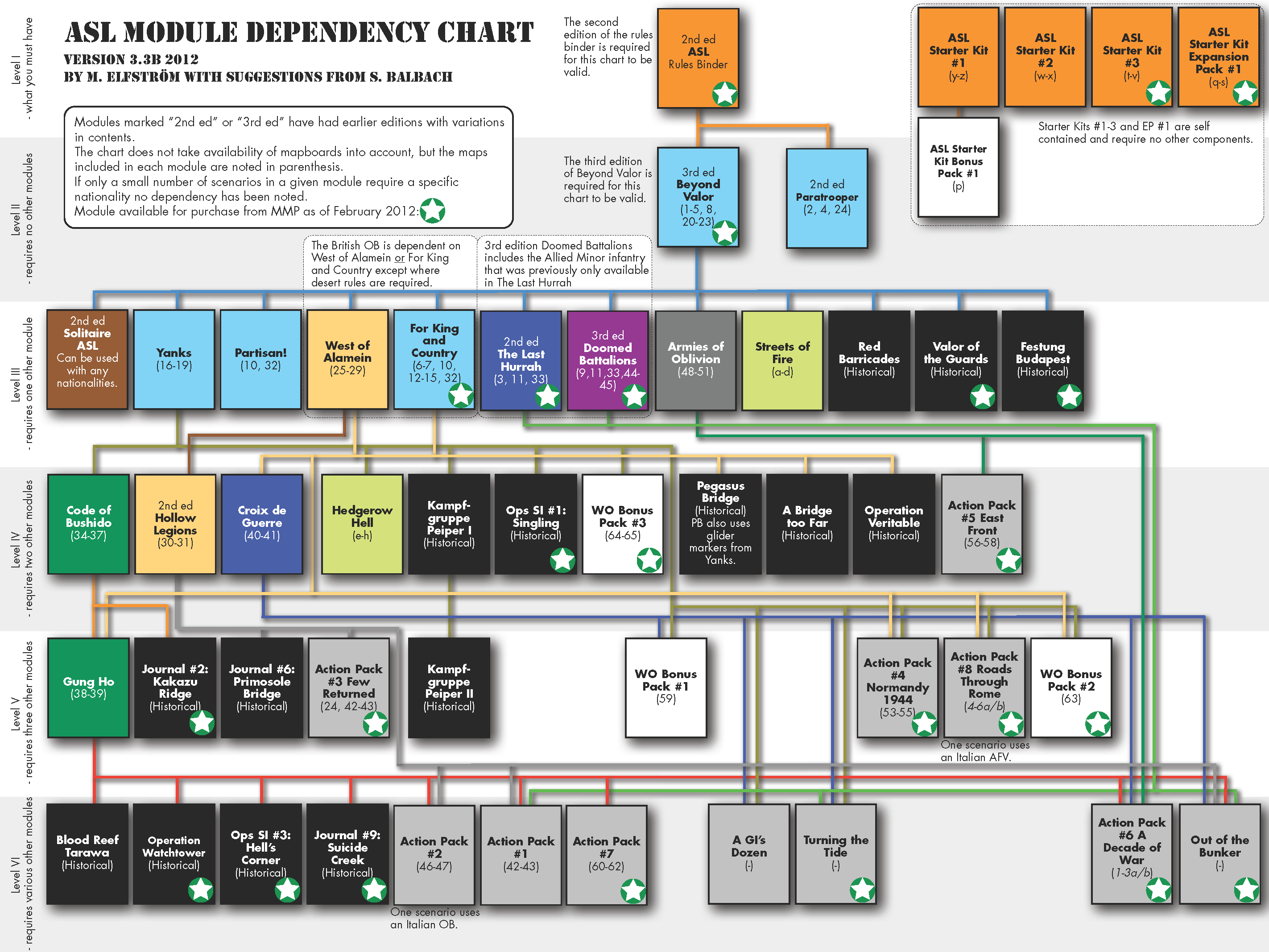
ASL Module Dependencies (as of 2012-02)

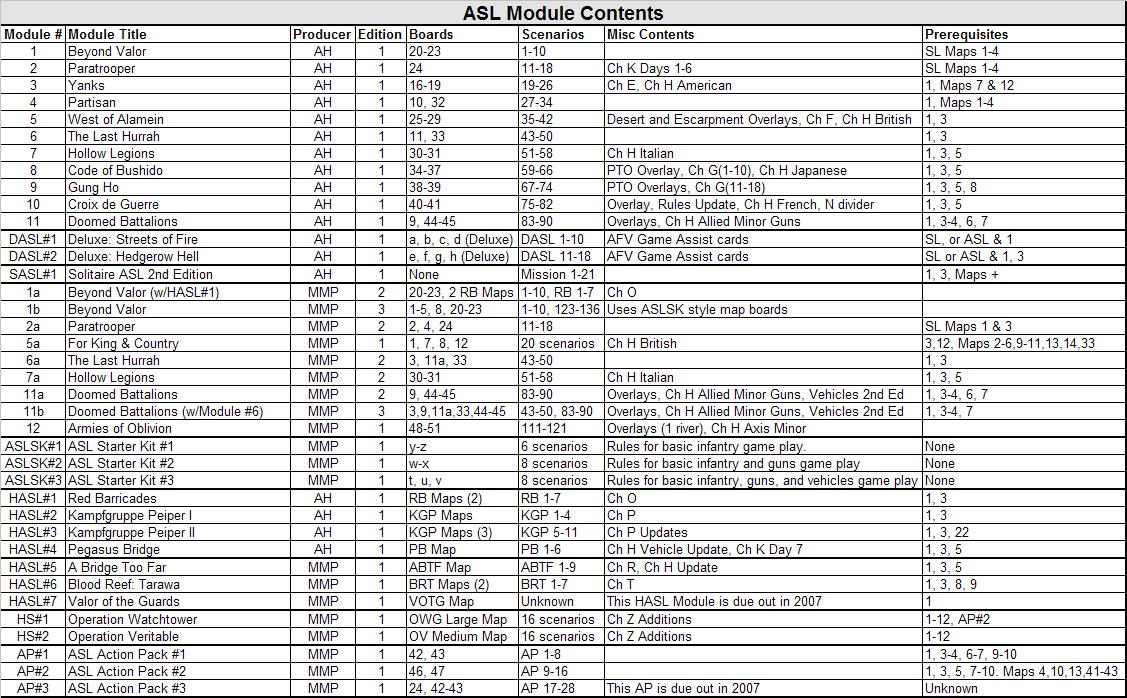
ASL Module Contents

This is not a complete list.

As well, the problem of prerequisites extends to the playing of printed scenarios, many of which require components from multiple modules, particularly those scenarios released by third-party publishers. For instance, the Order of Battle (OOB) from a module may be needed to play one module while a single map board from the same module may be required to play a particular scenario. The Hollow Legions (HL) Module was originally intended to add on to West of Alamein (WOA) and as such the OOB from For King and Country will not be enough to play all scenarios in HL as the WOA map boards are required as well. Furthermore, an MMP Action Pack is required for one module, a Historical Study.

Finally, the release of the 2nd Edition rules further complicates the process by making some sections of the 1st Edition obsolete. Full compatibility with 2nd Edition rules is only possible by owning the 2nd Edition. This forces some players to purchase the ASLRB all over again. An area the new rules simplifies is the Chapters included in various Modules. Originally a new module would add a new chapter to the ASLRB to cover the new material. For instance, the release of Yanks included special rules in Chapter E and a chapter detailing the American OOB. Any players wishing to use these rules in a following Module would also have to own Yanks. The 2nd Edition helps to alleviate this problem by supplying more rules in one binder. It still does not supply all rules for all situations. For instance, if you wish to play a scenario using Jungle terrain you will need the Code of Bushido module with its rules section. Also, the OOB of particular nationalities and the map boards from particular Modules may still be required for subsequent Modules.

=== ASL Action Packs ===
ASL Action Packs (AP) are published by MMP. They include new scenarios and boards. They do not contain new rules or counters, with the exception of AP 2 and AP 4 which have new rule pages inserts.

- Action Pack 1 (AH, 1997)
- Action Pack 2 (MMP, 1999)
- Action Pack 3: Few Returned (MMP, 2007)
- Action Pack 4: Normandy (MMP, 2008)
- Action Pack 5: Eastern Front (MMP, 2009)
- Action Pack 6: A Decade of War (MMP, 2010)
- Action Pack 7 (MMP, 2011)
- Action Pack 8: Roads Through Rome (MMP, 2011)
- Action Pack 9: To the Bridge! (MMP, 2014)
- Action Pack 10 (MMP, 2014)
- Action Pack 11: 29 Let's Go! (MMP, 2015)
- Action Pack 12: ASLOK XXX (MMP,2015)

== Deluxe ASL ==
Deluxe Advanced Squad Leader (DASL) was a version of the Advanced Squad Leader game introduced in 1985. Intended to be a fusion of 1:285 scale miniatures (so-called "micro-armor") and Squad Leader, the concept never really took off, at least in the printed form sold by Avalon Hill, and only two modules were released, both in 1985.

The 1st edition ASL Rulebook contained a chapter on painting 1:285 scale miniatures, and the Deluxe Advanced Squad Leader Modules were released soon after Beyond Valor. These map boards were 11" by 26" and had greatly enlarged hex grids, each hex being 2.2" inches across. The maps were designed to be used in conjunction with 1:285 scale miniatures, but could naturally be used with the standard cardboard counters and a very brief rulebook chapter gave some additional special rules for using the cardboard counters in the larger hexes. Only two modules were released; the drawback of the larger scale map boards was that the terrain being simulated had to be fairly close-in, and scenarios based on fighting in these kinds of environments. The two official releases focused on city fighting and the hedgerow country in Normandy.

In 2020, the DASL system was re-released. Included were the original 18 scenarios from the first two releases, as well as a further 20 scenarios, all updated scenarios previously released.

=== Streets of Fire ===
Board a	City Terrain
Board b	City Terrain
Board c	City Terrain
Board d	City Terrain
Scenarios: DASL1-DASL8

Streets of Fire was the first Deluxe ASL module to be released; the maps were very similar and depicted city terrain similar to that found on the mapboard 1 from Squad Leader or the "city boards" found in Beyond Valor.

=== Hedgerow Hell ===
Board e	Rural Terrain
Board f	Rural Terrain
Board g	Rural Terrain
Board h	Rural Terrain
Scenarios: DASL9-DASL16

Hedgerow Hell was the second Deluxe ASL module to be released. The maps represented typical bocage country, with many hedge depictions and more rural type terrain types.

=== Deluxe ASL ===
Board a	City Terrain
Board b	City Terrain
Board c	City Terrain
Board d	City Terrain
Board e	Rural Terrain
Board f	Rural Terrain
Board g	Rural Terrain
Board h	Rural Terrain
Scenarios: DASL1-DASL38

Deluxe ASL was released in 2020 at Winter Offensive in Bowie, Maryland. Its maps were the tri-fold style, repainted by Charlie Kibler and printed on card stock, the so-called "SK" style boards. Also included were all of the original Deluxe ASL overlays (from the 1995 Annual), also repainted by Charlie, and two sheets of *new* overlays and four additional sheets of wooden and stone rubble Kibler overlays

== Historical ASL ==
Several modules known as Historical Advanced Squad Leader modules, or HASL, feature maps based on actual terrain as well as historical "campaigns" (known as Campaign Games (CG)) where interlinked scenarios depict several days of fighting over historical objectives. MMP took over production of HASL with A Bridge Too Far, and also released "Historical Studies", or modules in which the geomorphic mapboards were sometimes substituted for actual terrain maps.

=== HASL modules ===
- 1989: Red Barricades
- 1993: Kampfgruppe Peiper I
- 1995: Kampfgruppe Peiper II
- 1996: Pegasus Bridge
- 1999: A Bridge Too Far
- 1999: Blood Reef: Tarawa
- 2001: Operation Watchtower (historical study)
- 2002: Operation Veritable (historical study)
- 2008: Valor of the Guards
- 2012: Festung Budapest
- 2018: Hatten in Flames
- 2019: Red Factories (incorporates reissued Red Barricades)

== Solitaire ASL ==
A module designed for solitaire play was designed by MMP, using dice and charts to generate opposing actions, in a system similar to earlier solitaire games like Ambush! or Tokyo Express. Only one module has been released, and MMP has announced that no reprint will be made. No new boards were released with the module, though Chapter S was included covering the special rules for SASL (a 2nd edition was released with expanded solitaire rules), informational counters, several types of charts, and 14 "Mission Cards", which were the SASL version of scenarios. Only German, Russian, Partisan and US forces were covered in this game, and the rulebook, Beyond Valor and Yanks were prerequisites.

A 2nd Edition was released expanding the charts to include all nationalities covered by ASL, with the exception of Axis Minors and the Finns. An expanded version of Chapter S was included and 21 Mission cards. Prerequisites for play of SASL depend on the nationalities involved.

== ASL Starter Kits ==
In 2004, in recognition that newcomers to the ASL hobby would have a hard time learning 200 pages of rules quickly and happily, the Starter Kits were introduced. Along with the new semi-mounted mapboards replacing the older mounted style, these kits provided newcomers to ASL with everything they needed to get into the game with a minimum of reading. In a form of Programmed Instruction not possible with the ASL Rulebook, each starter kit comes with a small pamphlet outlining only the bare minimum of rules necessary for play of the game. Each kit focuses on a particular aspect of ASL.

- ASL Starter Kit 1, German, American and Russian forces, infantry, support weapons
- ASL Starter Kit 2, German, Italian, British, Allied Minor, and American forces, ordnance
- ASL Starter Kit 3, German, American, British and Russian forces, tanks, armored cars
- ASL Starter Kit 4, Japanese and US Marine Corps units, including vehicles and ordnance.

=== ASL Starter Kit #1 ===
Board z	City Terrain
Board y	Rural Terrain
Scenarios: s1-s6

The first Starter Kit includes very basic rules to quickly get players into a simplified version of ASL. Counters are included for German, Russian and American infantry units and is intended as a stand-alone purchase with the expectation that players who enjoy the experience will feel comfortable "graduating" to the full-blown ASL game series. In addition to counters and two geomorphic boards (this release also marked the end of expensively mounted mapboards, introducing a less durable cardboard map style), a small rules booklet, quick reference chart, and two dice are included.

=== ASL Starter Kit #2 ===
Board x	Rural Terrain
Board w	Village Terrain
Scenarios: s9-s16

The second Starter Kit adds rules for using artillery pieces, anti-tank guns, mortars and shaped-charge weapons (SCW - in ASL specifically referring to infantry carried and shoulder fired weapons like the bazooka, PIAT or Panzerschreck). This game, like the first Starter Kit, is intended as a stand-alone game and includes two infantry-only scenarios. Only what is included is necessary for play of the game, with the expectation that players who enjoy the experience will feel comfortable "graduating" to the full-blown ASL game series. In addition to counters depicting various nationalities and boards, a small 20 page rules booklet, pair of quick reference charts, and two dice are included.

(Scenarios s7 and s8 were sold separately in issues of Operations Magazine and are currently available as free downloads from MMP)

=== ASL Starter Kit #3 ===
Board t	Rural Terrain
Board u	Village/Hills Terrain
Board v	Rural/Hills Terrain
Scenarios: s20-s27

ASL Starter Kit #3 adds rules for tanks and other vehicles. It contains a comprehensive starter kit 28-page rule book, and a 12-page Historical Notes (ASL chapter H) reference for the vehicles and ordnance contained. Two dice are included.

(scenarios s17 to s19 and 28-31 are available on MMP's website as free downloads)

=== Decision at Elst ===
Decision at Elst is the first Advanced Squad Leader Starter Kit Historical Module and covers the battle at Elst, Holland, in September 1944 between British and German units during Operation MARKET-GARDEN. It contains a 28-page Advanced Squad Leader Starter Kit basic rules book and a 20-page Decision at Elst Campaign Game rules booklet.

=== ASL Starter Kit #4 ===
Board m	Hill Terrain
Board n	Heavy Woods Terrain
Board o	Woods/Hills Terrain
Scenarios: s64-s71

ASL Starter Kit Module #4 PTO brings ASLSK to the Pacific Theater of Operations (PTO), and adds the Japanese and the United States Marine Corps to the ASLSK lineup. ASLSK#4 is a self-contained ASL module that gives players the opportunity to start playing Advanced Squad Leader almost immediately. Two dice are included.

== The General ==
The General was an Avalon Hill house organ and as such, regularly promoted ASL by including in-depth articles on gameplay, "series replay" features where games were recorded and printed move for further analysis, and published scenarios. There were three main categories of ASL Scenarios printed in The General: conversions from the original Squad Leader system, new scenarios, and tournament scenarios.

Squad Leader Conversions were lettered A-W, with the first scenarios appearing in Volume 22, Number 6 and the last in Volume 32 Number 3.

Tournament Scenarios were numbered T1 - T16, and ran between Volume 24, Number 2 and Volume 29, Number 1.

New scenarios included those for ASL (G1 - G46, Volume 23, Number 3 to Volume 32 Number 2) as well as three Deluxe ASL scenarios (DASL A - DASL C), one Historical ASL scenario, and one interesting new scenario using the map board from the Devil's Den game by Avalon Hill (a game about a battle of the American Civil War). This latter was numbered Scenario 3000. Scenario 2000 had been an SL scenario called Operation Hubertus, a "monster scenario" set in Stalingrad and apparently utilizing the research from the later module Red Barricades.

== ASL Annual ==
Aside from regular features in The General Magazine, AH also produced a series of magazines focused on ASL but with some original SL content also, beginning in 1989. The ASL Annual was, as the name implies, released once a year, with issues in 1989, 1990, 1991 and 1992, and two issues were published in 1993 (called ASL Annual '93a and ASL Annual '93b). No issue was published in 1994, with issues again appearing in 1995, 1996 and 1997. The 1995 issue was named ASL Annual '95w (Winter) in anticipation of a second issue that year being printed in the summer, but it did not materialize. Scenarios located in the ASL Annual were numbered sequentially with an "A" prefix, either ASL Scenario A1, A2, etc., or SL Scenario A1, A2, etc., Deluxe ASL Scenario A1, A2, etc.

== ASL Journal ==
When MMP took over publication of ASL components, they started to produce ASL Journal on a generally annual basis. Format for the magazine remained very similar to the ASL Annual, though no SL-themed content was included. with no outside advertising, and full of articles, variants, and scenarios for all incarnations of SL and ASL. New scenarios of ASL (or DASL) were given "J" numbers, while SASL scenarios were given an "r" prefix (since they utilized the Red Barricades mapsheets).

Title	Published	Scenarios
ASL Journal 1	1999	J1-12 & r1-4
ASL Journal 2	2000 & 2010	J13-35
ASL Journal 3	2001	J36-65
ASL Journal 4	2002	J66-77
ASL Journal 5	2003	J78-89
ASL Journal 6	2005	J90-101
ASL Journal 7	2006	J102-112, 122
ASL Journal 8	2009	J113-125 & VotG19-21
ASL Journal 9	2011	J126-146 & VotG22-24
ASL Journal 10	2012	J147-160, VotG25, FB18
ASL Journal 11	2016	J161-181, VotG26, VotG27, FB19, HS33, Squad Bleeder 4-6
ASL Journal 12	2017	J182-193

== Third party products ==
A variety of "third party" products have been developed for ASL on an ongoing basis by a variety of publishers, including scenario packs and historical modules (including mapsheets). Two prolific "third party" publishers are Critical Hit and Heat of Battle, who have both produced scenario packs, geomorphic and historical mapsheets, and even new playing pieces. In recent years Le Franc Tireur and Bounding Fire productions have also produced a number of substantial products. Other products include player aids such as cards indicating SAN (Sniper Activation Numbers) and for resolving OBA (Off Board Artillery) battery access. There is also an English online free-to-view fanzine called View From The Trenches containing articles, reviews, and occasionally scenarios. Since 1996, Evan Sherry and the Tampa ASL Group have produced Schwerpunkt (published by Sherry Enterprises), an ASL magazine that features scenarios, scenario analyses and articles. To date, the Tampa Group has published over 200 scenarios in the pages of Schwerpunkt and its sister publication, Rally Point.

=== Scenario design ===
Two (unofficial) books on ASL scenario design have been written by ASL enthusiasts. Scenario Designers Guide was self-published by Mark Pitcavage, and Scenario Designer's Handbook was published by Michael A. Dorosh.

== ASL for the computer ==
=== Early computer programs based on Avalon Hill games ===
While a computerized assistant for ASL was released (ASL Gamer's Assistance Program, or ASL GAP), no computerized version of the game itself has yet materialized. A similar game called Under Fire was released by Avalon Hill's computer division in 1985 but like most Avalon Hill computer games, was behind the industry standards for graphics and gameplay. It was not billed as a computer version of ASL, though it did bear some similarities in that players commanded roughly company sized forces. Only three maps were available for play. The game was released for Apple II, Commodore 64, and DOS systems. The game was unique (and rather unsatisfying to many) in that for each of the nine scenarios, victory was not declared at game's end. A results screen would show losses in men and equipment, and list possession of objectives, leaving the determination of "victory" to the player.

Approximations of a computerized version of SL/ASL was the 1981 release of Close Assault, also by Avalon Hill, which included an actual mapboard and counters that the human player used to make his moves. He would then input them into the computer for resolution of sighting and combat. Then the computer would make its move, and print only the results that the human units could see.

Though the counters were larger, they used the factors from Squad Leader. The player input the weapons and leaders directly into the game rather than using counters as in the board game.

Like the original Squad Leader board game, German, Russian and American nationalities were represented. The computer allowed three scenarios and any combination of two forces, including a hypothetical US vs USSR 1945 scenario.

The game was released for the Apple II, Atari 800, and the TRS-80.

=== Computer ASL interpretations ===
There have been a number of computer game interpretations of ASL.

Close Combat by Atomic Games was originally devised as a computer game version of ASL. Atomic Games had already developed several games for Avalon Hill, however, with Avalon Hill embroiled in a financial crisis that would ultimately lead to its demise, Atomic Games took what work they had completed, severed ties with the board game franchise and completed the game's development for Microsoft. The first three Close Combat games were notable, at the time, for being among the few games published by Microsoft. The final two games in the original series were, however, published by Strategic Simulations, Inc.

In 1998 Big Time Software negotiated with Avalon Hill to do a computerized version of Advanced Squad Leader, but plans fell through. Big Time Software went on to produce Combat Mission: Beyond Overlord, which was a 3D tactical computer game very similar to Advanced Squad Leader but with significant differences. While lacking much of the arcane detail of ASL (you could not swim, climb cliffs, or descend onto the battlefield by parachute), it also featured an innovative simultaneous turn-based system, and provided complete orders of battle for German, American, British, Canadian, Free French and Polish forces in Northwest Europe from 6 June 1944 to 8 May 1945.

Close Combat and Combat Mission both inspired later computer games which are beyond the scope of this article, including GI Combat (a 3D version of CC which also inspired Eric Young's Squad Assault and CMX2, a second-generation version of the Combat Mission game engine. None of these later offspring of CC or CM were directly related to ASL, and both series took on lives of their own.

WW2T is a 2D computer game for PC, Linux and Mac OSX based on the ASL rule set. The game has been released in 2015 and is currently in Alpha version. It can be played in hotseat mode, against another opponent in a LAN or online via a webservice. The rule set so far covers infantry and ordnance but is permanently extended. It also features a simple map and scenario editor to create your own matches. All ASL rules are fully validated by the game engine so new players without extended knowledge of the game rules should be able to play more rapidly.

=== Avalon Hill's Squad Leader ===
Hasbro eventually permitted the release of a game called Avalon Hill's Squad Leader The game, released by MicroProse in 2000 (but developed by Random Games), bore no resemblance to either Squad Leader or Advanced Squad Leader, was well behind industry standards in terms of graphics and gameplay, had an awkward interface and was on a completely different scale than the actual SL and ASL games.

=== Virtual Advanced Squad Leader ===
The most successful literal adaptation of ASL to the computer has been Virtual Advanced Squad Leader, designed by Rodney Kinney as described above. VASL still officially requires ownership of the physical components of the games, however, or at least of the printed scenario cards, reference cards, and rulebook. In addition to possession of these physical components, a detailed understanding of the rules must be expected of players, as the computer version does not enforce rules - it merely serves as a means of manipulating 2-dimensional virtual game boards and pieces in an online environment facilitating long distance play, either by email or in real time. The closest the game comes to performing any of the "chores" of playing ASL is by providing random dice roll results for both players and recording moves from hex to hex on the mapboards. Some LOS calculations can also be made by the computer engine.

== Reception ==
In Issue 23 of the Australian wargaming magazine Queensland Wargamer, Eric Topp was impressed by the production values, writing, "This is truly a quality product. Informative, full-colour illustrations are used throughout and the cardboard data sheets which divide the chapters are very handy." Topp felt that with the revisions to the rules, "This is a much 'cleaner' simulation that the old system. Scenarios may take longer to play but the new rules are easier to use and they fulfill the designers' claim of increased realism without sacrificing playability." Topp concluded, "I would suggest that all enthusiasts of the old Squad Leader take the plunge and invest in the finest WWII tactical warfare system ever."

In Issue 32 of the French games magazine Casus Belli, Pierre Stutin, outlined the major differences between the rules for Squad Leader and Advanced Squad Leader: clarity, simplicity, and practicality. Stutin also admired the production values, writing, "Everything in this rulebook is beautifully presented — from the game aids and diagrams to the examples, all of which are reproduced in full color. It is a set of rules that one enjoys leafing through, like a beautiful book." The only problem Stuitin had was with the price, "which exceeds the average gamer's budget. But doesn't such a game deserve a little extra effort?"
