= Yom Kippur: The Battle for the Sinai, October, 1973 =

1973 board wargame

Yom Kippur
- Cover art by Dean Essig
- Designers: Al Sandrick
- Illustrators: Dean Essig
- Publishers: The Gamers
- Publication: 1995
- Genres: Middle East conflicts

Yom Kippur: The Battle for the Sinai, October, 1973 is a board game published by The Gamers in 1995 that simulates the Yom Kippur War between Israel and a coalition of Arab states led by Egypt and Syria. The game won a Charles S. Roberts Award.

== Description ==
Yom Kippur is a two-player board wargame in which one player controls Arab forces while the other controls Israeli forces.

=== Gameplay ===
The game is part of the "Standard Combat" series published by The Gamers, and comes with a set of rules common to all of the games in this series, as well as rules that are specific to this game. The only other components are a 22" x 34" hex grid map and 280 die-cut counters.

The game uses an "I Go, You Go" system of alternating turns with a "Move – Fight – Exploit" structure first pioneered in Panzergruppe Guderian (SPI, 1976). The Arab player:

- Moves
- Attacks
- Moves motorized units a second time to exploit any holes in the enemy front that may have opened due to combat.

The Israeli player is given the same opportunities, completing one game turn. On the first turn, this represents one day. Thereafter, each turn represent two days.

The rules cover Egyptian SAMs and Sagger anti-tank missiles, as well as Israeli armored and air superiority.

=== Scenarios ===
The game comes with three historical scenarios:

- The entire battle, using either historical placement of military units or an option for players to set up their units as they see fit)
- The first Israeli counterattack
- The Battle of the Chinese Farm

There are also three hypothetical scenarios:

- The Israeli government believes its intelligence services and reinforces the Suez Canal before the attack
- The Arab attack across the Suez Canal is a total surprise.
- A scenario involving direct American and Soviet military involvement.

The longest scenario is 12 turns.

=== Ceasefire ===
As a random event, the United Nations may propose a ceasefire.

- If the players agree to the ceasefire, the game is over; victory points earned to that time are added up and the player with the most is the winner.
- If a player ignores the ceasefire, the player is penalized two victory points, and the game continues.

If a second ceasefire is also ignored, Soviet forces intervene on behalf of the Arabs, and American fores intervene on behalf of the Israelis.

== Publication history ==
In 1993, The Gamers published Stalingrad Pocket, the first in a line of relatively simple board wargames called "Standard Combat Series" (SCS) that would use a common set of rules. The fourth game in this series, Yom Kippur, was designed by Al Sandrick and was published in 1995 with cover art by Dean Essig.

A French language edition of the game was published by Oriflam in 1996, and a Japanese language edition was published in Command Japan #65 in 2006 by Kokusai-Tsushin Co., Ltd. (国際通信社) with artwork by Sawshun Yamagushi.

Multi-Man Publishing bought The Gamers in 2001, and re-released several games including Yom Kippur.

== Reception ==
In Issue 16 of Pyramid, Jimmie W. Pursell called this game "an outstanding piece of work and a fine addition to the SCS line. I highly recommend it to players interested in this era or subject and to those looking for a quick and simple game that still has plenty of chrome. I, for one, anxiously await the next game in the series."

In Issue 88 of the French games magazine Casus Belli, Frank Stora called the game "very manageable", and noted the special rules about missiles and air power "are handled without complexity and more or less correctly." However, Stora thought that direct Soviet/American intervention was "on the extreme edge of plausibility." Stora concluded, "In short, a game of good overall quality, but some points would benefit from more political and historical plausibility."

In Issue 5 of Zone of Control, John W. Kisner commented, "Every now and then you come across a game that works so well that you get excited about the hobby again. Yom Kippur is one of those games, a throwback to an age in which the complexities of the system do not obscure the problems faced by both sides."

In Issue 25 of Warning Order, Matt Irsik called this game "no frills, straight to the point." Irsik liked the large number of scenarios, noting "All in all, there is pretty good replay value here." Irsik also liked the fact that "there is some randomness and unknown factors that force both sides to adjust their strategies." Irsik did find a balance issue in the game, pointing out "the victory conditions are tougher on the Israelis and it forces them to act quicker than probably many players would like." Irsik concluded, "one of the positive things that Yom Kippur has going for it in comparison to many other games on this subject is playability. A fairly quick set up, few rules to memorize, nothing unusual in the sequence of play, and the game plays fast (probably 3-4 hours max). It may not be the most accurate game on the subject, but it is a lot of fun."

== Awards ==
At Origins 1995 Yom Kippur won a Charles S. Roberts Awards in the category "Best Post-World War II Board Game".
