= Leros: The Island Prize =

WWII board wargame published in 1996

- Designers: David A. Friedrichs
- Illustrators: Rodger B. MacGowan
- Publishers: Avalon Hill
- Publication: 1996
- Genres: WWII

Leros: The Island Prize is a board wargame published by The Gamers in 1996 that simulates the Battle of Leros during World War II. The game is the 8th in the "Tactical Combat Series" of games that use an identical series of rules.

== Background ==
On 8 September 1943, Italy revealed that they had signed the Armistice of Cassibile with the Allies. As German forces responded by attacking Italian forces and taking command of the Italian peninsula, British forces landed on the Italian-controlled island of Leros and dug in. The Germans responded by heavily bombing the island for 8 weeks, then sent a force to make amphibious and airdrop landings, which were furiously contested by the British and Italians.

== Description ==
Leros is a two-player board wargame where one player controls the German attackers, and the other player controls British and Italian defenders. The game, having 60 pages of rules, almost 600 die-cut counters, and three large 22" x 34" hex grid maps that together cover the entire island at a scale of 125 yd (115 m) per hex, is a relatively complex tactical game.

Five scenarios simulate the various phases of the battle, each using only one or two of the three maps. There is also a campaign game that combines all five scenarios, uses all three maps, and is estimated to take 10–20 hours to complete.

=== Gameplay ===
The game uses the Tactical Combat Series (TSC) general rules which use the following sequence of play:

1. Command Phase: Reinforcements, plan landing or drop zones, determine weather, write out orders for all units.
2. Aircraft Fire Phase: Players roll dice to see who goes first, then take turns with air strikes.
3. Action Phase: Players again randomly determine who will go first. Each player then has an opportunity for movement, artillery fire, suppressing fire, and assaults, in any order.

This completes one turn, which represent 20 minutes of game time.

There are also special rules that apply specifically to Leros. For example, during a firefight, one player can demand surrender rather than annihilating the remaining enemy.

== Publication history ==
In 1989, Dean Essig of The Gamers designed the wargame Bloody 110, the first in a planned series of World War II wargames that would use the same set of rules. As more games in the series were published and issues cropped up with the rules, new versions of the TCS rules were published, always usable for all previously published games in the series. In 1996, The Gamers published Leros, the 8th game in the series, designed by David A. Friedrichs to use version 3.1 of the TCS rules.

The Gamers published a total of fourteen games in the series. Multiman Publishing then acquired the game rights and created another four TCS games.

== Reception ==
In Issue 7 of Zone of Control, Steve Poitinger called Leros an "intriguing game". He noted that the campaign game required a lot of space and many hours of play, but highly recommended the campaign game over the shorter scenarios. "Yes, you can play one- and two-map scenarios. No, they aren't nearly as much fun as the three-map campaign game. [...] Those who can't satisfy the [needed] time and space requirements won't fully appreciate the Leros operation." Poitinger thought the German side was the more interesting force to handle, since the German player has to decide when and how to land. "The possibilities are fascinating. Do you send in lots of men at once, or stagger landings in order to give lead elements time to take out key coastal guns and defenses? Do you go at night or at dawn? Do you try a diversionary strike, or is brute force the best approach?" Poitinger concluded by giving the game an "Excellent" rating, saying, "The system really seems to capture the ebb, flow, maneuver, and overwatch of modern tactical combat. [...] If you're not afraid to take a few risks, it'll keep you on the edge of your seat for hours at a time."

In Issue 45 of The Canadian Wargaming Journal, Keith Martens liked the quality of the components, noting that they "hardly need any comment since The Gamers' quality is always there." Martens also liked the TCS rules, commenting that "The ability of both sides to reinforce the battle [...] spices things up. Also even open ground gives fire protection encouraging movement and a mobile helter-skleter battle." Martens concluded on a positive note, saying, "The full campaign area, interesting units and sweeping manoeuvres of Leros make it a great game, one that should entertain you for many hours."
