= Historical Advanced Squad Leader module =

Historical Advanced Squad Leader (HASL) are additional modules for the tactical wargame Advanced Squad Leader intended to depict historical events using maps produced from terrain maps, and featuring linked scenarios called Campaign Games. This article only lists official products produced by Multi-Man Publishing and Avalon Hill.

HASLs are not standalone, other ASL products are necessary for play (see module dependency chart), including counters, dice, the ASL Rulebook and in the case of the Historical Studies, geomorphic mapboards. In addition, some extra equipment is included in most HASL's, such as extra copies of commonly used counters in order to prevent shortages of vehicle or infantry types, as well as module-specific informational markers. Finally, each module/study contains its own rulebook chapter pages (or pages for just part of a chapter, in cases where multiple HASL modules share the same rulebook chapter), which give rules for module-specific terrain and units, as well as campaign game rules, and a black and white miniature of the historical map (if included) which can be photocopied and written on during the course of campaign play.

MMP differentiates products between "Historical Modules" and "Historical Studies". The primary difference is that Studies include some scenarios that use geomorphic mapboards. In most other respects, Modules and Studies are the same. They both contain historical maps, counters, rules, Campaign Games, and historical information. For the purpose of this article, modules and studies are treated equally and referred to as a HASL.

== Campaign Games ==
The centerpiece of HASL's, aside from the maps, are the Campaign Games.

The Campaign Game (abbreviated CG throughout the rules and hereafter) allows for a wide variety of situations and nearly limitless possibilities. Each player, or team of players, is assigned a certain force, given in terms of Companies, Platoons and Batteries as well as a number of campaign Purchase Points (CPP) and Fortification Purchase Points (FPP).

Each Company...is composed of a set number of squads and support weapons. Further, each Company can be either in a full-strength or depleted state...The CPPs are used to purchase additional forces throughout the game.

Unit purchases are made during a Refit phase taking place between game days – instead of a set number of game turns, actions now take place in game days. A game day is of variable length...

At the end of a campaign day both players place perimeter markings along their front lines, or around units if they're isolated. The perimeter serves as your start line for the next campaign day. This will usually result in wild jagged lines penetrating into enemy held areas which show where your last major effort was made...After each campaign day in which at least one side had decided to go on the offensive, each day varies from a minimum of five (game) turns to an infinite amount (though likely less than eight)...both sides (then) refit and redeploy anywhere along their defined perimeter...

Opposing sides do not fight tooth and nail every day. At the outset of each campaign day each side secretly chooses a(n)...Initiative chit, outlining its intentions (Attack or Idle)...On all results except (both players choosing) Idle, another game day is played out with its varying length. If both sides are Idle, then a game day passes without being played out...(either way, at day's end) both sides again go through the Refit Phase...The Refit Phase features events like promotion, extinguishing blazes, AFV machine gun exchange and scrounging (as well as purchasing fresh forces with CPP and FPP).

Red Barricades: Squads at the Gates: Advanced Squad Leader does Stalingrad by Tom Zlizewski Fire & Movement: The Forum of Conflict Simulation, August 1990 (Number 67)

Perhaps the only perceived drawback to the historical modules was a lessened re-playability. By their nature, map-boards were small and focused on close-in terrain such as urban, forest or jungle. While new scenarios for play on the historical maps were occasionally found in ASL themed periodicals such as ASL Annual or ASL Journal, the limited scope of the fighting on these maps restricted the number and type of scenarios possible. However, the dynamics of the campaign games guaranteed that no two CG would play out the same, even with the use of similar forces and identical terrain.

== HASL (boxed) ==
=== Red Barricades ===
Red Barricades (RB) was released in 1989 and focused on the fighting for the Krasnaya Barrikady ordnance factory complex in Stalingrad. It was designed by Charlie Kibler and was revolutionary since it was the first ASL module to include a large format map and other features now considered standard in big HASL modules. Special additions for this module include rules for new terrain types including debris, railway embankments, culverts, storage tanks, single hex two-story buildings, and modified rules for gullies, factories and cellars. As well, two new weapons (the Soviet Molotov cocktail projector, also known to Combat Mission players as an ampulomet) and the German StuIG (a 150mm infantry gun on a Panzer III chassis) are introduced. Three Campaign Games are included as well as 7 standalone scenarios. The Campaign Games include "Into the Factory" (17–29 October 1942), Operation Hubertus (11–15 November 1942) and The Barrikady (17 October – 15 November 1942). Scenarios included were RB1-RB7. Additional scenarios were also printed in the ASL Annual. Prerequisites included the ASL Rulebook and Beyond Valor.

This module was discontinued by Multi-Man Publishing but released as part of the 2nd Edition of Beyond Valor, which also went out of print. Multi-Man Publishing returned to the 1942 Stalingrad campaign with the "Valor of the Guards" historical module, which focused on the fighting around the central Stalingrad railway station including Pavlov's House. A sequel to Red Barricades named Red October was designed by Charlie Kibler. It has not yet been released as a separate HASL module, but it has been released as part of Red Factories, which combines both the original Red Barricades and Red October. See HASL 10 below.

=== Kampfgruppe Peiper I ===
Kampfgruppe Peiper I (1993) is the first of a two part module, focusing on the fighting by one of the SS armoured spearheads in the Battle of the Bulge in December 1944. Kampfgruppe Peiper is best known as the unit that perpetrated the Malmedy massacre, but that incident is not portrayed in the game, nor is the Baugnez Crossroads where the massacre took place. The rules chapter for this HASL Module includes rules for Pine Woods, Slope hexsides, and barbed wire fences, as well as modifications of existing rules for stream-hex terrain, village terrain, hillside walls and hedges, and known minefields. One mapsheet, for terrain surrounding Stoumont, Belgium, is included as well as 1 campaign game ("Clash at Stoumont", 19 – 21 December 1944) and 4 standalone scenarios. Scenarios KGP1-KGP4.

Prerequisites included the ASL Rulebook and Beyond Valor and Yanks.

=== Kampfgruppe Peiper II ===
Kampfgruppe Peiper II (1995) is the second half of the Kampfgruppe Peiper module (commonly abbreviated as KGP II). Acting as a companion to the KGP I module, it depicts the fighting between Waffen SS forces of Battle Group Peiper near the Belgian villages of Cheneux and La Gleize. Three mapsheets are included; a two-piece sheet covering the terrain around La Gleize and a single Cheneux sheet. Additional rules for Chapter P of the ASL Rulebook are also included.

Six standard scenarios using small portions of the two maps are included as well as one large or "monster" scenario using the entire La Gleize map. Scenarios KGP5 – KGP11.

=== Pegasus Bridge ===
Pegasus Bridge (1996) depicts the fighting at the so-called Pegasus Bridge on 6 June 1944, one of the events famously depicted in the 1962 film The Longest Day and also the subject of a book by Stephen Ambrose by the same name.

The module contains six stand-alone scenarios in addition to the requisite Campaign Games, two in number in this module. The mapsheet depicts the bridge and surrounding towns of Benouville and Le Port. Chapter Q of the ASL Rule Book is included. Additionally, Day 7 of the Chapter K training module is included (later released with the second version of the ASL Rulebook). Scenarios: PB1 – PB6.

=== A Bridge Too Far ===
A Bridge Too Far (1999) is named after Cornelius Ryan's famous book about Operation Market Garden, this module depicts the fighting by Lieutenant Colonel John Frost's parachute battalion at the Arnhem Bridge in September 1944.

Prerequisites include the ASL Rulebook, Beyond Valor, Yanks and either the 1st edition of West of Alamein or the new edition of For King and Country. Scenarios ABTF1-ABTF9.

The new rules chapter includes special rules for the Arnhem Bridge, the ramp leading up to the bridge, and a blockhouse located on the bridge, as well as new rules for factories and cellars, wide city boulevards, unit replacements, and partial orchards. Three campaign games are included as well as 9 standalone scenarios; the campaign games being "Block by Bloody Block" (17–19 September 1944), "A Dark and Fateful Day" (19–21 September 1944, and "A Bridge Too Far" (17–21 September 1944).

=== Blood Reef: Tarawa ===
Blood Reef: Tarawa (1999) depicts the landings at Betio Atoll in 1943 by United States Marines. It contains three campaign games and 7 standalone scenarios.

=== Operation Watchtower ===
Operation Watchtower (2001) is the first so-called "historical study" which combined actual (or "historical") maps with scenarios played on the geomorphic maps released with the core modules. This HASL module depicts the fighting on Guadalcanal from 7 August 1942 until February 1943.

=== Operation Veritable ===
Released in 2002 this historical study is the first official module to contain scenarios depicting Canadians (other than the Rogue Scenarios of the original Squad Leader game). A campaign game called "Riley's Road" is included with a historical terrain map, as well as scenarios using the geomorphic maps (and in one case using only terrain overlays). The scenarios all feature British and Canadian forces during Operation Veritable, the battles to clear the last German holdouts west of the Rhine, to the east of the Nijmegen Salient, as a preparation for the 21st Army Group's crossing of the Rhine River in March 1945.

The rules feature several new terrain types, as well as the German Sturmtiger AFV.

Being dependent on the geomorphic mapboards, the prerequisites for this module are many, including the ASL rulebook, "all core modules" according to the official website, and boards 4,5,11,19,43,46,49, and 50.

=== Valor of the Guards ===
Valor of the Guards (VotG) was published January 2008 and designed by Tom Morin. It covers the fighting in Stalingrad during September 1942 near the Central Railway Station and includes several famous historical locations such as Pavlov's House and the Univermag Department Store where General Paulus had his headquarters at the time of the surrender in February 1943. The rules include, as is common for HASL modules, several new terrain types. In VotG, this includes burned out stone buildings, Plazas, and partially destroyed buildings.

This Historical Module 7 was initially slated for a 2006 release but was actually released in 2008. Early advertisements for this game were seen as early as 2002 in ASL Journal #3, stating that pre-orders would be taken beginning in 2003. Pre-orders for the game went onto the MMP website on 21 December 2005.

=== Festung Budapest ===
Festung Budapest (FB) was published January 2012 and designed by Bill Cirillo. It covers the Siege of Budapest in 1945, during the period from 1 January through 10 February. Included are 17 scenarios and 3 Campaign Games. It requires only ownership of Beyond Valor except for one of the Campaign Games which optionally needs Armies of Oblivion (depending on resources purchased during the campaign).

=== Hatten In Flames ===
Hatten In Flames (HIF) was published August 2018 and was designed by Andy Rogers. It covers the fighting near Strasbourg in December 1944 between the American 7th Army and German 21st Panzer Division and 25th Panzergrenadier during operation Nordwind. The module focuses on the first five days of the fighting inside Hatten, as panzer units sought to break through to the open terrain of Alsace that lay beyond Hatten and Rittershoffen. These capture the portion of the battle where an intense combined-arms struggle between a few handfuls of infantry companies and tank platoons of both sides played out on a daily basis in this small French village. Included are eight scenarios and two Campaign Games. It requires only ownership of Beyond Valor and Yanks.

=== Red Factories ===
The HASL module 10 Red Factories (RF) was published in January 2019, designed by Charles Kibler. It incorporates a reprinting of Red Barricades (HASL 1) together with a new 'sister' module Red October (which apparently may become available separately). Red October covers fighting at the adjacent 'Krasny Oktyabr' factory complex in Stalingrad in late 1942. It comes with a new historical map (split in two, and which attaches to the side of the Red Barricades map), seven new scenarios and three campaign games. It also introduces some additional rules, which have been combined with the original rules from Red Barricades into a revised Chapter O. There are also eight sheets of counters. Ownership of only Beyond Valor is required to play.

== HASL (periodicals) ==
There have also been Historical Advanced Squad Leader offerings published in periodicals.

=== Gavutu-Tanambogo ===
ASL Annual '93b features a Gavutu-Tanambogo HASL feature with rules, scenarios, campaign games, and historical map insert. The module depicts the fighting for these two islands from 7 to 9 August 1942. These two small islands dominated the approach to Florida Island's deep water anchorage and were ordered secured as part of the invasion of Guadalcanal on 7 August 1942. The islands, garrison, and attack forces were small enough to be represented in their entirety in ASL format for this feature. This HASL module does not include a stand alone map. Instead, it includes three new overlays for each island that are placed atop the Ocean overlays from Gung Ho!

Both stand-alone scenarios as well as historical Campaign Games are included in the ASL Annual '93b issue. MMP has included this module as part of the Rising Sun core module.

=== The Road To Nhpum Ga ===
ASL Annual '97 includes a mini HASL game which consists of a fold out map, Campaign article and 4 scenarios. The game was designed by Chuck Powers and is set in Burma in late March 1944. The Campaign notes also refer to some scenarios (Orange at Walawbum / Last of their strength, etc.) that deal with the topic and are included in the Winter '95 ASL Annual.

=== Kakazu Ridge ===
ASL Journal #2 presents a Kakazu Ridge historical study which includes a full-sized HASL map, scenarios, counters and articles. This module depicts fighting on Okinawa in 1945.

=== Primosole Bridge ===
ASL Journal #6, released in 2005, offers a Primosole Bridge HASL feature with Rulebook Chapter, campaign games and historical map insert. This was designed by Randy Yeates. The Primosole Bridge battle occurred during the fighting on Sicily in 1943.

=== Suicide Creek ===
Suicide Creek, designed by Darrell Andersen, covers combat between the 7th Marine Regiment and the Japanese 141st Infantry Regiment at the Battle of Cape Gloucester, New Britain, in early 1944. There is one Campaign Game and six stand-alone scenarios. It was published in ASL Journal #9 in 2011.
