= A Bridge Too Far =

A Bridge Too Far may refer to:

- "A bridge too far", an idiom inspired by Operation Market Garden, meaning an act of overreaching
- A Bridge Too Far (book), a non-fiction book by Cornelius Ryan on Operation Market Garden
- A Bridge Too Far (film), a film based on the book, directed by Richard Attenborough
- Close Combat: A Bridge Too Far, a video game based on Operation Market Garden
- A Bridge Too Far, a Historical Advanced Squad Leader module for the board game Advanced Squad Leader based on Operation Market Garden

== See also ==
- A Bridge to Far, an album by Midlake
