= Hasl =

Hasl or HASL may refer to:

== People ==
- Drago Hasl, originator of the Slovenian carnival Kurentovanje
- Jožef Hasl (1733-1804), Slovenian Jesuit priest, devotional writer and translator

== Other ==
- Hot air solder leveling
- Historical Advanced Squad Leader module
- Health and Safety Laboratory, see Environmental Measurements Laboratory
- ICAO code of Shilavo Airport
- Height above mean sea level
