= Tunisia (board game) =

1995 board wargame by The Gamers

- Designers: Dean Essig
- Illustrators: Dean Essig
- Publishers: The Gamers
- Publication: 1995
- Genres: North Africa, World War II

Tunisia, subtitled "The Tunisian Theater of Operations, November 1942 to May 1943", is a board wargame published by The Gamers in 1995 that is a simulation of the Tunisian campaign during World War II.

== Background ==
Following Operation Torch that landed Allied forces in Tunisia, the forces made a run for Tunis but were met by Axis forces, leading to the Battle of Sidi Bou Zid, the Battle of Kasserine Pass, and eventually the destruction the Afrika Korps.

== Description ==
Tunisia is a two-player wargame, the third in the "Operational Combat Series" published by The Gamers. With each game in the series, the company published a set of rules common to all the games. These were updated from game to game, but the revised rules were always backwardly compatible with previous games in the series.

=== Components ===
The game box contains:

- two 22" x 34" paper hex grid maps, scaled at 8 km (5 mi) per hex
- 780 die-cut counters
- 40-page rule book with rules common to all games in this series
- 24-page rule book with rules specific to this game
- 2 Charts & Tables booklet
- counter storage tray
- two 6-sided dice

=== Gameplay ===
The game begins with just a few counters on the board. As reviewer Keith Martens noted, it is a complex rules system, and this allows new players to learn the game with relatively few forces to marshal. As the game progresses into mid-1943, major reinforcements become available to both players. The games in the "Operational Combat Series" were notable for their lack of a zone of control rule. In most wargames, a unit must stop when crossing into an opponent's zone of control, and then must engage in combat. This stricture does not exist in Tunisia or its sister games.

The sequence of events in each turn follows this order:

- Roll for initiative
- First player
  - Air Unit return
  - Reinforcements
  - Movement
  - Supply
  - Reaction (the non-active player may move units in Reserve Mode)
  - Combat
  - Exploitation: Any units that received "Exploitation" result during combat now can move up to half their allowance, along with any units in Reserve Mode, who can move their full allowance.

The second player then has the same opportunities, completing the full game turn.

== Publication history ==
In 1992, The Gamers published Guderian's Blitzkrieg: The Drive on Moscow, the first wargame in the "Operational Combate Series", and a finalist for two Charles S. Roberts Awards. This was followed in 1994 by Enemy at the Gates, which won a Charles S. Roberts Award for "Best World War II Board Game of 1994". For the third game of the series, Dean Essig designed Tunisia and also created the artwork for it.

In 2001, The Gamers was taken over by Multi-Man Publishing, who revised and republished this game as Tunisia II in 2016.

== Reception ==
In Issue 44 of The Canadian Wargaming Journal, Keith Martens said the "intricate yet slick" combat rules and the lack of zone of control rules "make these games different than any other on the market." He liked the small number of counters at the start of the game, pointing out that it made the game accessible to new players, and "really speeds the turns along." Martens concluded, "This is a fine addition to one of the best series in gaming and becomes in my opinion the best game on Tunisia, it is a first class simulation with tension and fun to play."

Game designer and reviewer Richard Berg disagreed with the lack of zone of control, and found the game very long, but admitted that "it is fun. It's also good to look at." Berg found the rules "fairly easy to assimilate" despite their complexity, but noted the combat system "produces lots of results, few of which seem, to me, to reflect reality." He also found the air system "arcane". Overall, he gave the game a strong recommendation, saying, "Tunisia is a really fun game to play. [...] The best operational level WWII system around, even with its game length and obscurities, and this is the best game in that system. Buy it, Play it. Enjoy it."

In Issue 5 of Zone of Control, David A. Newport liked the streamlined rules, finding the game "is playable within a reasonable time, doesn't need teams, and requires relatively modest table space." Regarding the game itself, Newport called it "a classic match-up: Nearly overwhelming Allied resources meet German armor in a hard-fought contest." Newport concluded by giving the game grades of "Good" for gameplay, and "Excellent" for historicity, saying, "While the game may take three to four sessions to play to conclusion, the time is well rewarded."

== Awards ==
Tunisia was the winner of the Charles S. Roberts Award for "Best World War II Board Game of 1995", and was a finalist for "Best Wargaming Graphics of 1995".
