= Operations (magazine) =

Wargaming magazine

Operations Magazine #53, Fall 2008

Operations was Multi-Man Publishing's house organ for articles and discussion about its wargaming products, published from 1991 to 2010. The stated aim of Multi-Man Publishing was to have Operations be to their line of games what The General was to Avalon Hill's line of products. It was published from 1991 to 2010, when it was replaced by a new magazine called Special Ops.

== History ==
The first issue of Operations was published in the summer of 1991 by The Gamers and was printed regularly, until The Gamers were taken over by MMP. The magazine was produced quarterly, until Issue 42, when production slowed to semi-regular status with only one issue being produced in 2003, and two issues a year in 2004 and 2005. Bruce Monnin, founder of The Boardgamer magazine, became editor of Operations beginning with the Fall 2004 edition (issue 46). The Boardgamer was founded in 1995 to support the old Avalon Hill games and was published from 1996 to 2004. The last issue of Operations was #53 in the Fall of 2008, but there were also three Special Operations issues published yearly in 2008-2010 that had additional content such as full games, maps and counters. In Summer 2011 MMP published the first issue of its new "house organ" called Special Ops.

== Issues ==
The magazine published quarterly beginning in 1991. By 2001, the printing schedule became extremely irregular, and output fell from four issues a year, to as little as one. The final issue, number 53, was published in 2010. Three "special editions" were published as summer issues in consecutive years in 2008, 2009, and 2010.

== Awards ==
Operations was nominated in the "Best Professional Wargame Magazine" category of the Charles S. Roberts Award (CSR) nine years in a row from 1992 to 2000, and again in 2005, but never won. It did win other CSR awards for best articles and games. The game "Iwo Jima: Rage Against the Marines", published in Special Operations, won the Charles S. Roberts Award in 2008.
