= Dean Essig =

Wargame designer

Dean Essig (March 13, 1961 - March 24, 2024) was a wargame designer who founded The Gamers, a wargame publisher. He designed over 90 wargames, won several awards for his designs, and was inducted into the Charles S. Roberts Hall of Fame in 1993.

== Early life ==
Dean Essig was born in Elgin, Illinois to Norman and Alice (nee Rainey) Essig. Essig started playing wargames while attending James B. Conant High School,, and he became interested in military history at University of Illinois Urbana-Champaign. .

== Military ==
After graduation, Essig enlisted in the U.S. Army, and then moved to the National Guard. He was medically retired in 1991 as a 1st Lieutenant after losing his thumbs in a mortar firing accident.

== The Gamers ==
In 1988, Essig founded The Gamers as an independent wargame publisher based in Homer, Illinois, with Essig initially designing the game rules as well as the artwork and hex grid maps. Essig came up with the idea of using the same set of rules and identical map scale for each game series, such as brigade-level wargames about the American Civil War, so that players would only have to learn one set of rules for multiple games of the same type. Essig demonstrated this with his first two games in his Civil War Brigade Series (CWBS), In Their Quiet Fields (Battle of Antietam) and Thunder at the Crossroads (Battle of Gettysburg). He and David Powell then adapted this rules system to a Napoleonic Brigade Series (NBS), the first game of the series being Powell's Austerlitz, with illustrations by Essig.

Essig initially started out in 1988 focusing on very experienced wargamers, but by 1993, he was marketing to less-experienced players.

Between 1988 and 2001, The Gamers produced 51 wargames by several designers. During that time, Essig received many awards for his designs, including three James F. Dunnigan Awards for Playability and Design. In 1993, Essig was inducted into the Charles S. Roberts Hall of Fame.

In 2001, Essig sold The Gamers to Multi-Man Publishing, but Multi-Man continued to use Essig as a game designer until his death.

Essig became well known in the wargame industry. Fellow game designer Richard Berg noted "Dean has one of the more sensitive fingers on the industry pulse."

== Personal life ==
Essig and his wife Sara raised a daughter and two sons. Essig had expressed an interest in flying at an early age, and in the 1990s, he earned his pilot license and bought a vintage 1949 Cessna 195. In February 1998, on his first extended flight in the Cessna, Essig crashed while landing at Horace Williams Airport, hospitalizing himself and two passengers with serious injuries.

In late 2023, Essig suffered a cancer-related stroke while driving, and the ensuing accident caused injuries severe enough to require hospitalization. During recovery, it was discovered that his cancer had spread, and Essig died in March 2024.

== Works ==
Over his life, Essig designed over 90 games, including:

- Guderian's Blitzkrieg: The Drive on Moscow (1992). The first in the "Operational Combat Series" (OCS), and a finalist for two Charles S. Roberts Awards.
- Enemy at the Gates (1994). Second game in the OCS, and winner of a Charles S. Roberts Award for "Best World War II Board Game of 1994".
- Tunisia (1995). For the third game of the OCS, Essig designed both the game and the artwork.
- Hunters from the Sky (1994). The sixth entry in the Tactical Combat System (TCS).
- Crusader (1998).

== Awards ==
- 1993 Charles S. Roberts Hall of Fame Inductee
- 1993 James F. Dunnigan Award for Playability & Design
- 1994 James F. Dunnigan Award for Playability & Design
- 1997 James F. Dunnigan Award for Playability & Design
- 2007 James F. Dunnigan Award for Design Elegance
- 2012 James F. Dunnigan Award for Design Elegance
