= Hunters from the Sky =

Board game

Hunters from the Sky is a 1994 tabletop board game published by The Gamers.

== Gameplay ==
Hunters from the Sky is a game in which a World War II wargame centers on the German invasion of Crete. The game follows a modular format as part of the Tactical Combat System: each game includes a series rulebook for core mechanics and a game-specific rulebook tailored to its scenarios. The system is designed for compatibility across titles, allowing players to integrate updated rules with older games. Gameplay unfolds at a scale of 20 minutes per turn and 125 yards per hex, with counters representing various military units such as vehicles, platoons, and artillery. Units are rated for attributes like attack, range, morale, and defense, and the game distinguishes between point and area fire types, as well as target classifications. During the action phase, players can move and fire units in any order, and artillery can be called at any time. The overwatch mechanic allows reactive fire.

== Publication history ==
Hunters from the Sky was designed by Dean Essig and published by The Gamers, as the sixth entry in their Tactical Combat System (TCS).

== Reception ==
Jimmie Pursell reviewed Hunters from the Sky for Pyramid magazine and stated that "I cannot recommend Hunters from the Sky enough. The components are beautiful, the game play intuitive and the overall package magnificent. And this much-improved rules version can be used with older games in the system with a minimum of difficulty. This game's a winner."

== Reviews ==
- Casus Belli #86
