= The Last Hurrah (Advanced Squad Leader) =

WWII board wargame

The Last Hurrah is a World War II board war game published by Avalon Hill in 1988 as an expansion of their popular Advanced Squad Leader (ASL) wargame.

== Description ==
The Last Hurrah is an expansion to ASL that simulates military combat during the German invasions of smaller European countries during the first years of World War II.

The game box includes two hex grid maps and 260 counters representing forces of small countries such as Poland, Belgium, the Netherlands, Yugoslavia, Greece and Norway. This is not a standalone game; components from two other previously published expansions, Beyond Valor and Yanks, are needed in order to play.

The game outlines eight scenarios:

- Charge at Krojanty, Poland, 1939
- Norwegian Campaign, 1940
- Invasion of Crete, 1941
- Invasion of Belgium, 1939
- Invasion of Yugoslavia, 1941
- Another scenario set in Belgium, 1939
- Invasion of the Netherlands, 1939
- Polish forces try to escape Russian invaders, 1939

== Publication history ==
Avalon Hill published Squad Leader in 1977, and it proved popular enough that the company published a revised edition called Advanced Squad Leader in 1985, and followed this up with a number of expansions. The sixth of these expansions, The Last Hurrah, was designed by Don Greenwood, Rex Martin and Brian Martuzas, and was published by Avalon Hill in 1988.

== Reception ==
In Issue 5 of the UK games magazine Games International Ellis Simpson was impressed that Avalon Hill would published such minor military encounters, commenting, "Few games attract enough of a following to make a module based entirely on the Allied minor nations of the Second World War even a possibility; with ASL it is not only thought of, it's fashioned, honed and produced to the highest industry standards with more care and attention than many competitors. The Last Hurrah is, if nothing else, an exquisite (if modest) addition to the ASL universe." Simpson didn't like the high price, noting "The only criticism is that at £15.95 it's damn expensive; not so much in play value (in pence per game ASL is cheap) but more by comparison with the dollar price. Nevertheless, a welcome module for ASL and one which proves Avalon Hill's dedication to the completion of the project." Simpson concluded by giving it a rating of 3 out of 5.

In Issue 50 of the French games magazine Casus Belli , Pierre Stutin wrote, "Eight scenarios isn't a lot of course, but none of them should be thrown away. We note an improvement in the team that develops them." Stutin concluded, "The Last Hurrah is therefore a more interesting expansion than it seems."
