= West of Alamein =

1988 board game

Cover art by George Parrish

West of Alamein is a board wargame published by Avalon Hill in 1988 that simulates combat in North Africa during World War II.

== Description ==
West of Alamein is an expansion for Avalon Hill's Advanced Squad Leader wargame, the first to include counters for British forces. It is not a complete game, requiring a copy of the original ASL rules and German counters; and for four of the eight scenarios, maps from a previous expansion, Yanks.

=== Components ===
The game box contains:

- five mounted 8" x 22" geomorphic hex grid maps
- 520 1/2" die-cut counters (British platoons and leaders)
- 704 5/8" die-cut counters (British tanks and vehicles)
- Terrain overlays
- Three 3-hole-punched chapters of rules (to be added to the original ASL rules binder):
  - Chapter F "North Africa"
  - Chapter H: "Design Your Own Scenario"
  - Chapter N: "Armory" (Equipment for ASL expansions West of Alamein, The Last Hurrah, and Partisan!)

=== Scenarios ===
Eight scenarios, numbered 35–42, are included with the game:
35. "Blazin' Chariots"
36. "Rachi Ridge"
37. "Khamsin"
38. "Escape from Derna"
39. "Turning the Tables"
40. "Fort McGregor"
41. "A Bridgehead Too Wet"
42. "Point of No Return"

=== Gameplay ===
The West of Alamein expansion uses the usual rules for Advanced Squad Leader, enhanced by the rules for desert maneuvers and combat included in this product.

== Publication history ==
Avalon Hill first published the platoon-level tactical wargame Squad Leader in 1977. It was a bestseller for the company, and in 1985, Avalon Hill produced a complete revision of the game, Advanced Squad Leader. The game rules were printed in a 3-ring binder to make the addition of new rules and errata easier. Avalon Hill also produced a number of expansions for ASL, the fifth being West of Alamein, which was designed by Bob McNamara, with interior art by Charles Kibler and cover art by George Parrish.

== Reception ==
Games International highlighted West of Alamein as its "Wargame of the Month" in Issue 3. Reviewer Ellis Simpson was impressed by the components, calling the desert maps "beautiful" and noting the accuracy of the printing on the die-cut counters. Simpson noted that a lot of new work had gone into this rules expansion, saying "this module is no formula rip-off". His only complaints were the high price for the American game (£40 in the UK), and the fact that maps from another expansion, Yanks, were required for some of the scenarios. Despite these issues, Simpson concluded by giving the game a perfect rating of 5 stars out of 5, saying, "For fans of the system, a must. For those who have yet to savour ASL I can only recommend that you try a few games out with someone who has reasonable expertise with the system. I think you'll enjoy it."

== Awards ==
West of Alamein was a finalist for the Charles S. Roberts Award in the category "Best World War II Game of 1988."

== Other recognition ==
A copy of West of Alamein is held in several collections:

- The Strong National Museum of Play (object 112.6842).
- The Edwin and Terry Murray Collection of Role-Playing Games, 1972-2017, Duke University.

== Other reviews and commentary ==
- The General Vol 25 #3
- Fire & Movement #59
- Revistas Lider Juegos de Rol & Simulacion (Spanish)
- Casus Belli #49
