= Austerlitz (1993 board wargame) =

Napoleonic board wargame

- Cover art: 1807, Friedland by Ernest Meissonier
- Designers: David A. Powell
- Illustrators: Dean Essig
- Publishers: The Gamers
- Publication: 1993
- Genres: Napoleonic

Austerlitz is a board wargame published by The Gamers in 1993 that simulates the Battle of Austerlitz between Napoleon's French forces, and the Austrian-Russian forces of the Third Coalition.

== Background ==
On 2 December 1805, an Allied force of Russians and Austrians was lured into a trap by Napoleon near the town of Austerlitz.

== Description ==
Austerlitz is a two-player wargame in which one player controls the Alliance army, and the other player controls the French army.

=== Components ===
The box includes two 22" x 34" hex grid maps scaled at 180 metres (200 yd) per hex, 560 counters, a rule booklet, a scenario booklet and a folder of charts.

=== Gameplay ===
The game uses a system of "I Go, You Go" alternating turns that take the following sequence:

1. Command Phase: Both players write down orders for their units. After the Command Phase, the player must wait for the written orders to be passed to the appropriate commander before the order can be carried out. Depending on the efficiency of the army's command system, this may be very quick or very slow.
2. Cavalry Charge Phase
3. Move/Close Combat Phase
4. Fire Phase
5. Rally Phase

== Publication history ==
After producing a series of Civil War Brigade (CWBS) games that used a common rules system and map scale, The Gamers adapted this rules system to a Napoleonic Brigade Series (NBS), the first game of the series being Austerlitz. The NBS game system was devised by Dean Essig and David Powell. Powell then created Austerlitz, which was published as a boxed set in 1993 with illustrations by Essig.

The Gamers would produce two more games in the NBS series: Marengo (1995), and Espinosa (2002).

== Reception ==
In Issue 12 of Berg's Review of Games (Winter 1993–94), Richard Berg found the production values quite good. The two maps were "handsome and readable, with the trademark combination of warm reddish-browns with cool gray-greens." Berg had complained about The Gamers' CWBS system previously, and he still had the same problems with several rules in Austerlitz, namely "stragglers" and "skirmishers." Berg also did not like the Written Orders phase, saying, "You either like this sort of thing or you don't … and, if you don't, this game is NOT for you, as the Command system is, if not the heart, the soul of the game." Berg also did not like the Cavalry Charge phase, calling it "a mite overwrought, stops the game dead while you figure it out each time, and has that ahistorical anomaly of having charging and countercharging units meeting halfway like two berserk sumo wrestlers." Berg's final problem with the game was that it was historically very accurate — the French always win. Berg felt this limited its replayability, since the players would always know who is going to win. As Berg concluded, "Excellent recreation of the battle, which is less a plus than a problem."

In Issue 87 of the British games magazine Perfidious Albion, Charles Vasey found the rules system too detailed, writing, "The Gamers [are] men who want a dice-roll for everything (and probably a dice roll to have the dice roll). Their rule books are wordy and worthy, they heap detail upon detail, they include everything but the kitchen sink ... [resulting in] unwieldy systems that could be improved with a little lateral thought." Vasey also found the combat system overly complicated, noting "This arises from breaking each combat down into a number of sub-phases. Marching, firing for both sides, checking for half-losses, checking morale, marking losses, checking for stragglers,considering further morale. Putting chits on the counters, taking them off et cetera." Overall, Vasey found the game overly long, with no commensurate amount of increased enjoyment. Vasey concluded, "As a whole I found the game unfocused, overly ornate and lacking the real feel of sudden victory and defeat ... I cannot recommend Austerlitz to anyone."

In Issue 78 of the French games magazine Casus Belli, Frédéric Bey warned, "Obviously, a simulation of this precision and quality, on the scale of a brigade, creates a significant management burden for the wargamer. Despite the beauty of the map and the efficient simplicity of the counters, despite the game aids, it is difficult to ignore the sheer number of operations required to complete a game turn. The challenge, difficult to overcome, is to achieve less than half an hour of real time for every half hour of simulated combat." Bey concluded, "Austerlitz is therefore a wargame purely for enthusiasts, ready to sacrifice entire days to recreating the exploits of the Little Corporal. However, one shouldn't dismiss The Gamers' system without having experienced the unique flavor of this December 2nd, 1805, so expertly crafted by David A. Powell, whose inventiveness and precision are beyond question."

== Awards ==
At the 1993 Charles S. Roberts Awards, Austerlitz was a finalist in the category "Best Pre-World War II Board Game."
