= Invasion of Belgium =

Invasion of Belgium may refer to:

- German invasion of Belgium (1914)
- German invasion of Belgium (1940)

== See also ==
- List of wars involving Belgium
