= Horace Williams Airport =

Former airport of Chapel Hill, North Carolina, United States (1933–2018)

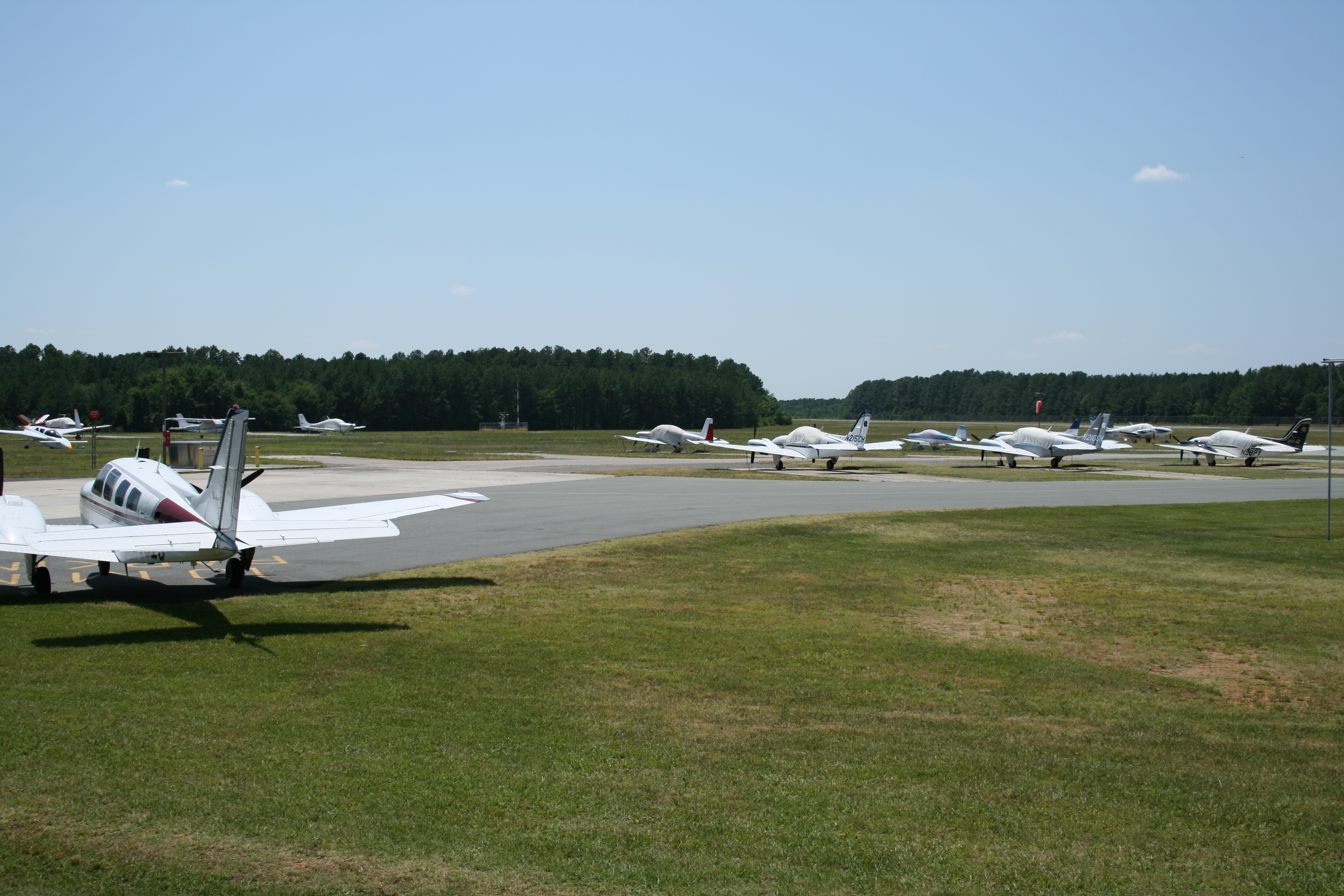
- IATA: none; ICAO: KIGX; FAA LID: IGX

Summary
- Airport type: Defunct
- Owner/Operator: University of North Carolina at Chapel Hill
- Location: Chapel Hill
- Closed: May 15, 2018
- Elevation AMSL: 512 ft (156 m)
- Coordinates: 35°56′06″N 079°03′57″W
- Website: www.airport.unc.edu
- Interactive map of Horace Williams Airport

Runways
Direction	Length		Surface
Direction	ft	m	Surface
9/27	4,005	1,221	Asphalt

Statistics (2007)
- Aircraft operations: 10,800
- Based aircraft: 47
- Source: Federal Aviation Administration

Horace Williams Airport (ICAO: KIGX, FAA LID: IGX) was a public use airport located one nautical mile (1.9 km; 1.2 mi) north of the central business district of Chapel Hill, a city in Orange County, North Carolina, United States. It was owned by the University of North Carolina at Chapel Hill.

Although most U.S. airports use the same three-letter location identifier for the FAA and IATA, Horace Williams Airport is assigned IGX by the FAA but has no designation from the IATA. The airport's ICAO identifier is KIGX.

== History ==
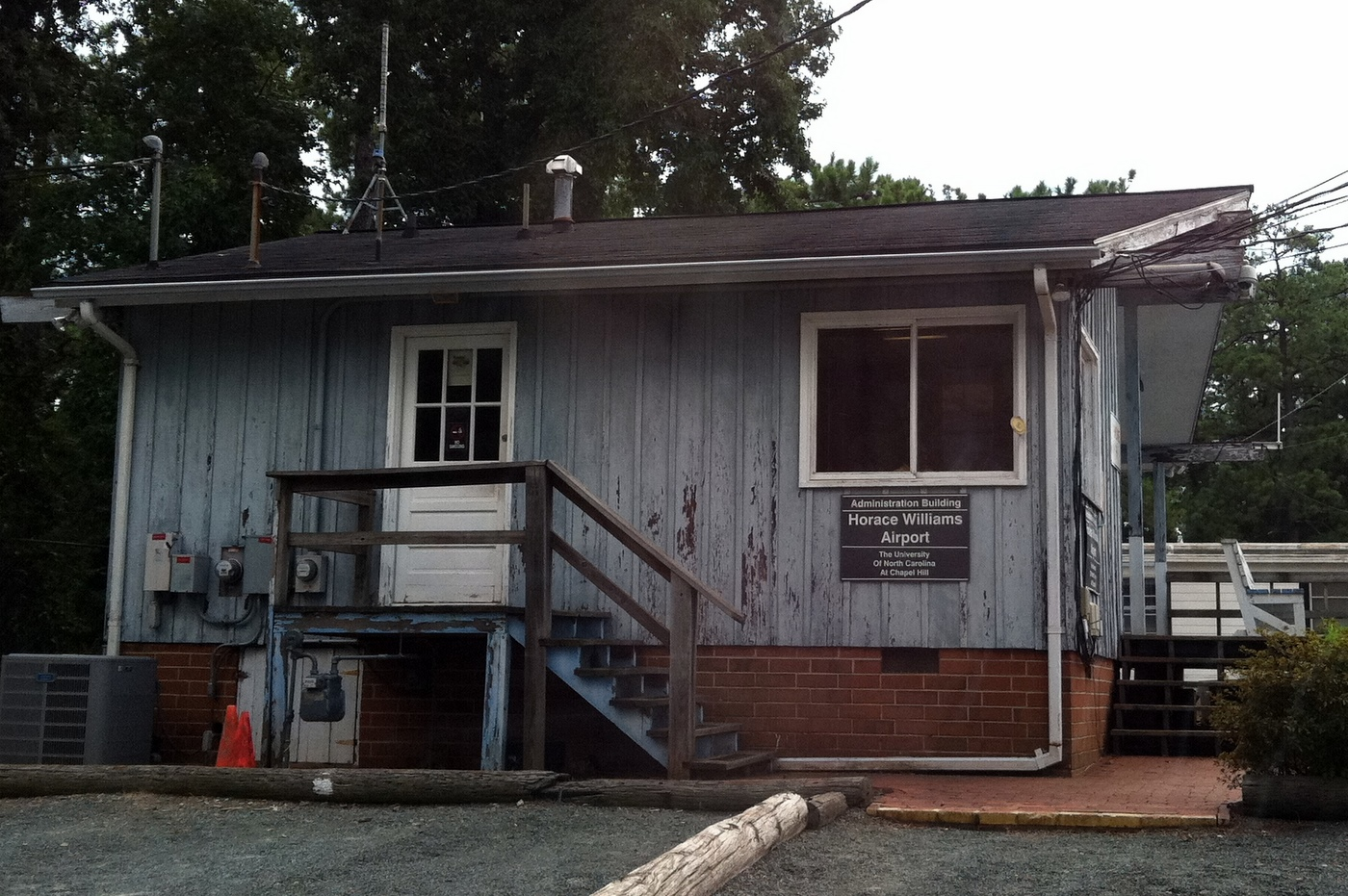
Administration building

Originally known as Martindale Field for Chapel Hill contractor Lee Martindale and one of the first airfields in North Carolina. Then renamed "Chapel Hill Airport" and offered pilot training and air shows. The airport was purchased by the university in 1940 and renamed for Prof. Horace Williams, Chair of Mental and Moral Science (Philosophy) at the university during the first half the twentieth century, who also donated much of the land needed to expand the airport.

== Facilities and aircraft ==
Horace Williams Airport covers an area of 420 acres (170 ha) at an elevation of 512 feet (156 m) above mean sea level. It has one runway designated 9/27 with an asphalt surface measuring 4,005 by 75 feet (1,221 x 23 m).

For the 12-month period ending July 31, 2007, the airport had 10,800 aircraft operations, an average of 29 per day: 94% general aviation, 5% air taxi and 1% military. At that time there were 47 aircraft based at this airport: 77% single-engine and 23% multi-engine.

== Safety Incidents ==
On July 12, 2010, a Cirrus SR 20 carrying Kyle Henn, the brother of a victim of the July 2010 World Cup Finals bombing in Uganda, crashed upon landing at the airport. One person was killed during this crash; Henn survived with non-life-threatening injuries and acted to try to save the crash victim after impact.

== Closure plans ==
The university planned to close the airport to make room for construction of Carolina North, a planned major long-term expansion of its campus.

Opposition to closure plans began immediately after the announcement of the planned closure in 2000, when pilots claimed that closing this air field would be a loss of infrastructure that would never be replaced. They noted that upgrades to the airport approved by the FAA had kept pace with current technology, and it was staffed with meticulous attention to detail and careful people, although there have been some complaints about runway maintenance. The position of general aviation advocates and lobbyists was that there is something very special about airplanes, and to lose them in Chapel Hill for the sake of more buildings, traffic, and population density must be carefully considered.

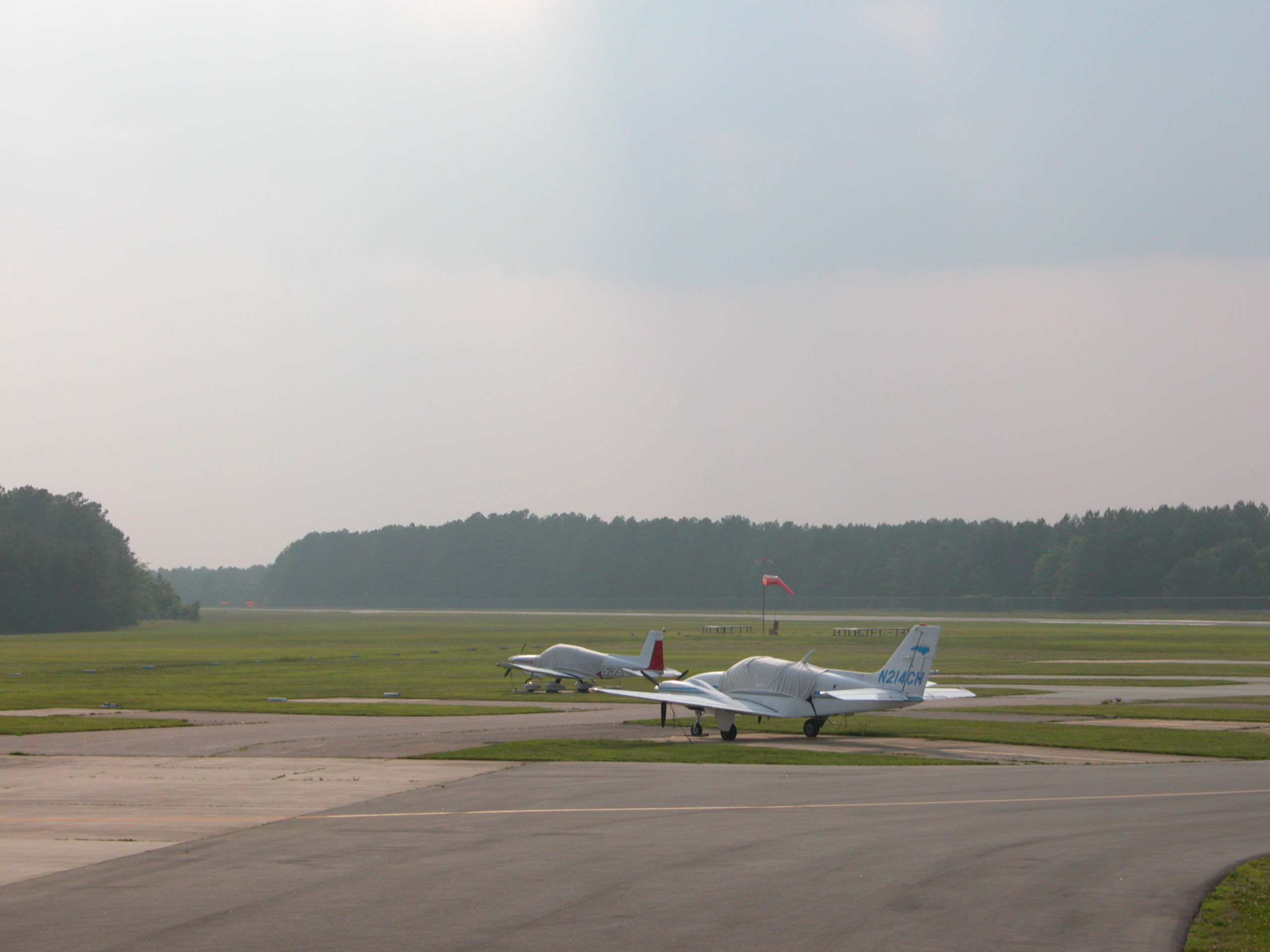
Horace Williams Airport in June 2005

Conflict between the town and airport advocates has had a history dating back to the 1980s, revolving around issues such as the location of the airport in a residential area that includes 4 schools, a church, and a YMCA, as well as several crashes in the area that eventually resulted in the university's ejection of a flying club flight school from the airport. Critics of the airport noticed that the university's first plans for the Carolina North project included keeping the airport in close proximity to occupied buildings and reminded the university that liability in the event of another crash could be substantial, given the existence of guidelines recommending against building so close to a working runway. In addition, interested private-industry interests indicated concern about the costs and liabilities of building on the site if the airport remained. The plans for Carolina North were revised, and the UNC Board of Trustees commissioned a study on the basis of which they ordered the airport closed.

The university's plans for airport closure were blocked in the state legislature on at least three occasions since the 2000 announcement. Although some planes using the airport did so on university business, opposition to closure was historically offered primarily by private plane owners and general aviation lobbyists desiring to preserve their access to the airport. Most recently, opposition efforts focused on the university's planned move of six Area Health Education Centers (AHEC) planes to new facilities at Raleigh-Durham International Airport, to make way for construction of the first phase of the new Carolina North campus project, planned to include teaching, research, and cooperative public-private projects affiliated with the university. However, economic realities stalled all progress on development of Carolina North, and the airport remained open and active.

In May 2018, a NOTAM appeared announcing the permanent closure of the airport, effective May 15. According to local news sources, the closure will make way for a solar energy project. Airplanes based at Horace Williams were removed from the airport prior to May 1.
