= The Gamers =

American game publisher

The Gamers was a designer and publisher of board wargames that, over the course of 20 years, won over a dozen Charles S. Roberts Awards.

== History ==
The Gamers was founded in 1988 by game designer and artist Dean Essig in Homer, Illinois. Instead of designing a new game system for each game, Essig decided that The Gamers would produce a number of games, but categorized into different series. The games in each series would use a common set of rules. Each game within the series would also have a subset of rules to deal with situations unique to that battle.

The company's games received good critical reception, and won a total of 14 Charles S. Roberts Awards.

The Gamers was bought by Multi-Man Publishing in 2001. Multi-Man continued to use the services of Essig as game designer until his death in 2024. Multi-Man publishes new materials for the original Gamers series as well as new games and new game series.

=== Series ===
The Gamers produced games in seven different series:

- Civil War Brigade (CWB): American Civil War battles at the brigade level.
- Regimental Sub-System Series / Line of Battle (RSS/LoB): American Civil War battles at the regimental level.
- Tactical Combat Series (TCS): 20th-century platoon level battles.
- Operational Combat Series (OCS): 20th-century battles at battalion and division levels.
- Standard Combat Series (SCS): General system that allows simulation of a wide range of battles.
- Napoleonic Brigade Series (NBS): Brigade-level battles during the Napoleonic Wars.
- Battalion Combat Series (BCS): 20th-century battles at the battalion level.

(One game, Circus Minimus, was not categorized. A new category, Modern Tactical Combat, was announced but no games were ever published for it.)

== Homercon ==
Homercon, a convention for The Gamers games, was held each September in Homer from 1990 until 2012.

== List of games ==
=== Civil War Brigade Series (Series #1) ===
Game	Subject	Year	Designer	Series Number	Awards
In Their Quiet Fields	Antietam	1988	Dean Essig	CWB 1	
In Their Quiet Fields II	Antietam	1995	Dean Essig	CWB 1a	
Thunder at the Crossroads	Gettysburg	1988	Dave Powell	CWB 2	
Thunder at the Crossroads II	Gettysburg	1992	Dave Powell	CWB 2a	
August Fury	2nd Battle of Bull Run	1990	Dave Powell	CWB 3	
Barren Victory	Chickamauga	1991	Dave Powell	CWB 4	
Bloody Roads South	The Wilderness	1992	James Epperson	CWB 5	
Perryville	Perryville	1992	Dave Powell	CWB 6	
Embrace an Angry Wind	Spring Hill & Franklin	1992	Dean Essig	CWB 7	
No Better Place to Die	Murfreesboro	1994	Dave Powell	CWB 8	CSR award nominee
April's Harvest	Shiloh	1995	Al Wambold	CWB 9	CSR award nominee
Champion Hill	Champion Hill	1996	Ken Jacobsen	CWB 10	CSR award nominee
Gaines Mill	Seven Days Battle I	1997	Dave Powell	CWB 11	CSR award nominee
Seven Pines	Seven Pines & Seven Days Battle II	1998	Dean Essig	CWB 12	
Malvern Hill	Seven Days Battle III	1999	Dean Essig	CWB 13	CSR award nominee
Three Battles of Manassas	1st & 2nd Bull Run, hypothetical 3rd Bull Run	2004	Thomas Prowell	CWB 14	CSR award nominee
Strike Them a Blow	North Anna	2006	Bob Munns	CWB 15	

=== Regimental Sub-System Series (Series #7) / Line of Battle (Series #8) ===
Game	Subject	Year	Designer	Series Number	Awards
This Hallowed Ground	Gettysburg	1998	Dave Powell	RSS 1	CSR award nominee
This Terrible Sound	Chickamauga	2000	Dave Powell	RSS 2	CSR award nominee
A Fearful Slaughter	Shiloh	2004	Dave Powell	RSS 3	CSR award nominee
South Mountain	South Mountain	2008	Dave Powell	RSS 4	
None But Heroes	Antietam	2011	Dean Essig	LoB 1	CSR award WINNER
Last Chance for Victory	Gettysburg	2014	Dean Essig	LoB 2	
To Take Washington	Monocacy, Fort Stevens	2019	Dean Essig	LoB 3	
No Turning Back	Battle of the Wilderness	2026	Dean Essig	LoB 4	
Inferno in the Bluegrass	Battle of Perryville	2027	Nick Roser	LoB 5	
This Bloody Hill	Battle of Champion Hill		Nick Roser	LoB 6	

=== Tactical Combat Series (Series #2) ===
Game	Subject	Year	Designer	Series Number	Awards
Bloody 110	Battle of the Bulge	1989	Dean Essig	TCS 1	CSR award nominee
Objective: Schmidt	Hürtgen Forest, Ardennes Campaign	1990	Dave Powell	TCS 2	CSR award nominee
Omaha	Omaha	1991	Dave Powell	TCS 3	
Matanikau	Matanikau River	1993	Sam Simons	TCS 4	
GD '40	Stonne, Battle of France	1993	Wig Graves	TCS 5	CSR award nominee
Hunters from the Sky	Maleme Airfield, Battle of Crete	1994	Wig Graves	TCS 6	CSR award nominee
Black Wednesday	Krasny Bor	1995	Dave Friedrichs	TCS 7	CSR award nominee
Leros: The Island Prize	Leros	1996	Dave Friedrichs	TCS 8	
GD '41	Tula Road, Battle of Moscow	1996	Wig Graves	TCS 9	CSR award WINNER
Semper Fi!	Korean War	1997	Lee Forester	TCS 10	CSR award WINNER
Raging Storm	Anzio, Allied invasion of Italy	1997	Nigel Roberts & Bob Runnicles	TCS 11	
A Frozen Hell	Tolvajärvi, Winter War	2000	Al Wambold	TCS 12	CSR award nominee
Screaming Eagles in Holland	Veghel, Operation Market Garden	2002	Nigel Roberts & Bob Runnicles	TCS 13	
Bloody Ridge	Guadalcanal, Bloody Ridge	2005	Michael Smith	TCS 14	
GD'42	Operation Mars	2009	Wig Graves	TCS 15	
Canadian Crucible	Norrey-en-Bessin, Battle of Normandy	2013	Larry Brien	TCS 16	
Ariete	First Battle of Bir el Gubi	2020	Mauro De Vita	TCS 17	
Goose Green	Battle of Goose Green	2023	Carl Fung	TCS 18	
Force Eagle's War	(Hypothetical NATO-Warsaw Pact conflict)	1990	Dean Essig	TCS, Modern Expansion 1 (Series #3)	

=== Operational Combat Series (Series #4) ===
Game	Subject	Year	Designer	Series Number	Awards
Guderian's Blitzkrieg	Operation Barbarossa	1992	Dean Essig	OCS 1	CSR award nominee
Enemy at the Gates	Stalingrad	1994	Dean Essig	OCS 2	CSR award WINNER
Tunisia	Tunisia	1995	Dean Essig	OCS 3	CSR award WINNER
Hube's Pocket	Western Ukraine	1996	Dave Friedrichs	OCS 4	CSR award nominee
DAK, DAK II	Western Desert Campaign	1997, 2004	Dean Essig	OCS 5	CSR award WINNER
Burma	Burma Campaign	1999, 2014	Dave Friedrichs	OCS 6	CSR award WINNER
Sicily	Sicily	2000	Dean Essig	OCS 7	CSR award WINNER (tie)
Guderian's Blitzkrieg II	Operation Barbarossa	2001, 2011	Dean Essig	OCS 8	CSR award nominee
Korea: The Forgotten War	Korean War	2003, 2020	Rod Miller	OCS 9	CSR award nominee
Case Blue	Case Blue & Stalingrad	2007	Dean Essig	OCS 10	CSR award WINNER
Baltic Gap	Baltic Offensive	2009	John Kisner & Hans Mielants	OCS 11	
The Blitzkrieg Legend	Battle of France	2012	Hans Kishel	OCS 12	
Reluctant Enemies	Syria–Lebanon Campaign	2014	Curtis Baer	OCS 13	
Beyond the Rhine	Northwestern Europe Campaign	2015	Roland LeBlanc	OCS 14	
Tunisia II	Tunisia	2016, 2019	Dean Essig	OCS 15	
Operational Matters: OCS Guide (Sicily II insert)	Sicily	2016, 2024	Dean Essig (game)	OCS 16	
Smolensk:Barbarossa Derailed	Battle of Smolensk (1941)	2018	Hans Kishel	OCS 17	
Hungarian Rhapsody	Siege of Budapest	2020	Stéphane Acquaviva	OCS 18	CSR award nominee
The Third Winter	Battle of the Dnieper	2022	Antony Birkett	OCS 19	CSR award nominee
Crimea: Conquest and Liberation	Crimean campaign & Crimean offensive	2023	Guy Wilde & Antony Birkett	OCS 20	
Luzon: Race for Bataan	Philippines campaign (1941–1942)	2024	Matsuura Yutaka	OCS 21	
The Forgotten Battles	Smolensk operation	2025	Antony Birkett	OCS 22	
The Hero City	Siege of Leningrad	2027	Antony Birkett	OCS 23	
First of September	Invasion of Poland		Carl Fung & Wig Graves	OCS 24	

=== Standard Combat System (Series #5) ===
Game	Subject	Year	Designer	Series Number	Awards
Stalingrad Pocket	Stalingrad	1992	Masahiro Yamazaki	SCS 1	CSR award WINNER
Stalingrad Pocket II	Stalingrad	1996	Dean Essig	SCS 1	
Afrika	Western Desert Campaign	1993	Dean Essig	SCS 2	CSR award WINNER
Afrika II	Western Desert Campaign	2006	Dean Essig	SCS 12	CSR award nominee
Ardennes	Battle of the Bulge	1994	Dean Essig	SCS 3	CSR award nominee
Yom Kippur	Sinai Front, Yom Kippur War	1995	Al Sandrick	SCS 4	CSR award WINNER
Crusader	Operation Crusader	1997	Dean Essig	SCS 5	CSR award nominee
Gazala	Gazala	1999	Dean Essig	SCS 6	CSR award nominee
Drive on Paris	Western Front 1914	2000	Al Wambold	SCS 7	CSR award WINNER
Fallschirmjäger	Airborne assault against Holland 1940	2001, 2026	Al Wambold	SCS 8	CSR award nominee
Operation Michael	Operation Michael	2002	John Best	SCS 9	
The Mighty Endeavor	Operation Overlord to V-E Day	2005	Steve Newhouse & Tim Armstrong	SCS 10	CSR award nominee
Guadalajara	The Battle of Guadalajara in 1936	2006	Ernesto Sassot	SCS 11	
Rock of the Marne	The last German offensive in WW1	2008	John Best	SCS 12	
Bastogne	Siege of Bastogne, Battle of the Bulge	2009	Dean Essig	SCS 13	
Karelia '44	Karelian Offensive, Continuation War	2011	Ken Jacobsen	SCS 14	
It Never Snows	Operation Market-Garden	2012	Dean Essig	SCS 15	CSR award nominee
Heights of Courage	Golan Heights, Yom Kippur War	2012	Steve Newhouse	SCS 16	
The Mighty Endeavor: 2nd Edition	Operation Overlord to V-E Day	2013	Dean Essig (expansion)	SCS 17	
Day of Days	Normandy Landings from D-Day to D+9	2015	Lee Forester	SCS 18	
Panzer Battles	The Battle for the Chir River, 1942	2016	Dean Essig	SCS 19	
Autumn for Barbarossa (Spec OPS #7)	Battle of Smolensk (1941)	2017	Dean Essig	SCS 20	
Rostov '41	Battle of Rostov	2020, 2024	Ray Weiss	SCS 21	
North Africa	Western Desert Campaign	2021	Dean Essig	SCS 22	
Iron Curtain	Hypothetical NATO-Warsaw Pact offensives, 1945-1989	2020	Carl Fung	SCS 23	CSR award nominee
Autumn for Barbarossa (boxed game with 5/8" counters)	Battle of Smolensk (1941)	2021	Dean Essig	SCS 24	
Ardennes II	Battle of the Bulge	2023	Dean Essig	SCS 25	
Drive on Kharkov	Third Battle of Kharkov	2027	Steve Newhouse	SCS 26	

=== Napoleonic Brigade Series (Series #6) ===
Austerlitz	Austerlitz	1993	Dave Powell	NBS 1	CSR award nominee
Marengo	Marengo	1995	Dave Powell	NBS 2	CSR award nominee
Aspern-Essling	Aspern-Essling	1999	Jerry Malone	NBS 3	
Espinosa	Espinosa	2002	Anders Fager	NBS freebie	
Montebello	Montebello	2006	François Vander Meulen	NBS freebie	
Talavera	Talavera & Vimeiro	2007	Jerry Malone & Anders Fager	NBS 4	CSR award nominee

=== Battalion Combat Series (Series #9) ===
Last Blitzkrieg	Battle of the Bulge	2016	Dean Essig	BCS 1	
Baptism by Fire	Battle of Kasserine Pass	2017	Dean Essig	BCS 2	
Brazen Chariots	Operation Crusader, Siege of Tobruk, Operation Brevity, Operation Battleaxe, Operation Skorpion	2019	Jim Daniels	BCS 3	CSR award nominee
Panzers Last Stand	Operation Konrad, Siege of Budapest, Operation Southwind, Operation Spring Awakening	2021	Carl Fung	BCS 4	CSR award nominee
Arracourt	Battle of Arracourt	2022	Carl Fung	BCS 5	CSR award nominee
Valley of Tears	Yom Kippur War	2023	Carl Fung	BCS 6	CSR award WINNER
Inflection Point	Battle of Kalach and Battle of Chir River	2025	Dean Essig and Carl Fung	BCS 7	
Danger Forward	Battle of Gela	2026	Dean Essig and Carl Fung	BCS 8	
The Breaking Point	Battle of France	2027	Carl Fung	BCS 9	

=== Uncategorized ===
Circus Minimus	Chariot racing	2000	Dean Essig	—
