= The General (magazine) =

Bi-monthly periodical

- General Volume 23, No. 4 (1987)
- Categories: Wargaming magazine
- Publisher: Avalon Hill
- First issue: 1964
- Final issue: 1998
- Country: United States
- Based in: Baltimore, Maryland
- Language: English
- ISSN: 0888-1081
- OCLC: 6372396

The General (1964–1998) was a bi-monthly periodical devoted to supporting Avalon Hill's line of wargames, with articles on game tactics, history, and industry news. It was the first professionally produced wargaming magazine for the nascent cardboard and hex-map wargaming hobby. Over the years the magazine was variously called The Avalon Hill General, Avalon Hill's General, The General Magazine, or simply General. It was headquartered in Baltimore, Maryland. With the sale of Avalon Hill to Hasbro in 1998 the magazine ceased. Its unofficial heir was Operations Magazine published by Multi-Man Publishing to support the line of Avalon Hill games that remained in print, but that too went out of print in 2010, replaced by Special Ops magazine in 2011.

== History ==
When the first issue was published, wargaming in the modern recreational sense was still in its infancy, and The Avalon Hill Game Company had been producing wargames for a mass market for only five years. It was the first professionally produced wargaming magazine ever published for the nascent cardboard and hex-map wargaming hobby.

The first issue, twelve pages in length, was published on 1 May 1964. A six-issue (one year) subscription was $4.98. There were 72 subscribers listed in Issue #1, 500 for Issue #2, and Issues #3 and #4 each added another 100 subscribers.

The third issue featured a $0.25 discount coupon that could be used in any purchase direct by mail from Avalon Hill (with small print indicating a minimum of four coupons had to be redeemed at a time); these coupons would be a regular feature of the magazine. In 1965, Volume Two featured the addition of area editors based geographically around the United States; article submissions started to appear with such frequency that area editors were dropped after Volume 2 Issue 5. Volume Three, Number One boasted an expansion to 16 page format. By the fourth year of publication, many new fanzines and amateur publications began cropping up, and Avalon Hill promoted the sale of such, suggesting that these amateur publications were good for the growth of the wargaming hobby. Volume Four also marked the change from dull paper stock to glossy paper.

In 1972, editorship passed from Thomas N. Shaw to a young Don Greenwood, who was just graduating from college. Volume 9 Number 1 would be his first issue, and he would remain at the helm until January 1982 when Rex A. Martin took over (Volume 18 Number 5). In July 1992, the editorial duties were passed on to Don Hawthorne (Volume 28 Number 1). Hawthorne was a published science fiction author before joining Avalon Hill, and left the company in 1992 to return to writing full time, creating the "War World" series with John F. Carr. He was succeeded by Robert Waters (Volume 29 Number 3) after an issue with Gary Fortenberry as associate editor and Donald J. Greenwood as executive editor. In 1995 (Volume 30 Number 4), Stuart K. Tucker became the editor until the Hasbro buyout in 1998.

By the 1980s the format had become remarkably stable; the cover would feature the boxtop art from one of Avalon Hill's games; The Avalon Hill Philosophy would contain industry news from the editor (though generally not mentioning games by other companies), a set of articles would contain variants for games, historical background to games, or game tactics/strategy discussions. The format by this time was 60 pages. A contest in each issue would focus on one particular game in the AH line, and the answer to a previous contest would appear. Each issue also had "So That's What You've Been Playing" showing statistics of mail in surveys included in each issue, where players rated the Avalon Hill (and later, Victory Games, the sister company to AH) titles they had been playing according to frequency. A Reader's Buyers Guide rated games on overall value, components, complexity, completeness, playability, availability, and game length (again, based the bi-monthly surveys). "The Infiltrator's Report" featured news on games in the Avalon Hill pipeline as well as industry news. The magazine would also contain full page advertisements for Avalon Hill Games (and for a brief period, a pull out section called "The Victory Games Insider" would feature news and information on Victory Games products). "The Question Box" would feature questions and answers previously received regarding rules of various Avalon Hill Games which would be published to clarify game playing procedures. Sports and Computer Games had their own sections, though the meat and potatoes of Avalon Hill's line were the board wargames. Certain flagship games would have semi-regular feature columns, such as Diplomacy's "The Complete Diplomat" or Advanced Squad Leader's "ASL Clinic".

Under Tucker's editorship, the magazine underwent a facelift and positioned itself in the center of the boardgaming hobby by acknowledging the wider hobby with reviews of competing company games and the expanding computer gaming market. Through surveys, marketing through retail bookstores, and a better understanding the interests of its core following, the magazine turned around previous declining subscription trends, with a 25% increase in subscriptions in two years.

The General ceased publication in the wake of the Avalon Hill buyout by Hasbro in 1998. The last issue was Volume 32, Number 3. Hasbro briefly toyed with the idea of having another of its subsidiaries, Wizards of the Coast, operate the magazine, but couldn't make a business case for it before Tucker moved on to become the editor of C3i magazine for GMT Games.

== Successors ==
Operations Magazine by Multi-Man Publishing considers itself a direct descendant; editor Bruce Monnin's first issue (No. 46, Fall 2004) carried the following message:

On the MMP website, when describing Operations, it states, "The content of the magazine will slowly evolve to include other MMP games and will eventually become to MMP what The General was to The Avalon Hill Game Company."

Multi-Man Publishing has the rights to several important former AH games, including Advanced Squad Leader . Operations Magazine ceased publications in 2010 (its last full regular issue was in 2008), replaced in 2011 with Special Ops magazine.

== Reviews ==
The British wargame magazine Perfidious Albion (est. 1976) often included summaries and opinions on recent issues of The General (and other magazines); for example PA issue #8 (August 1976) leaf #12, includes information about The General issue May-June 1976. Similar information can be found in issue numbers 6,14,16,18,19,21,25,28,29,30, 33, 35, 37, 39, 44, 45, 46, 47, 48. 49 and 50. Back issue archives are available online.
