= Mark Pitcavage =

American political scientist

Mark Pitcavage is a historian and analyst of far-right wing groups. He works with the Anti-Defamation League and was the creator of the now-archived Militia Watchdog website. The site has been an archive since 2000 when Pitcavage took the position of Director of Fact Finding for the Anti-Defamation League. Pitcavage earned a PhD in American military and social history from Ohio State University in 1995. His PhD dissertation was entitled "An Equitable Burden: The Decline of State Militias 1783-1858".

== Activism ==
=== Militia Watchdog ===
The Militia Watchdog website was founded by Pitcavage in 1995 following the Oklahoma City bombing and operated until 2000. The site's subscription list, which mainly included law enforcement officers and other "watchdog" groups, is still being used by the Anti-Defamation League (ADL). The site also worked in cooperation with other "watchdog" groups such as The Center for New Community, the Southern Poverty Law Center and the Simon Wiesenthal Center.^{(p34)}

Pitcavage's Militia Watchdog profiles have been used as a source for writers on militias and their activities. With the success of the Militia Watchdog project, Pitcavage was made the Director of Investigative Research for the State and Local Anti-Terrorism Training Program (SLATT).^{(p34)} The SLATT program is funded by the Bureau of Justice Assistance (BJA) of the U.S. Department of Justice.

=== Anti-Defamation League ===
The ADL absorbed Pitcavage's Militia Watchdog group and now maintains the site as an archive of his work between 1995 and 2000.

== Commentator on terrorism, gangs, and extremism ==
In the late 1990s and early 2000s, Pitcavage was cited as a terrorism and extremism expert by mainstream media.

In 2002, he was interviewed and quoted at length about prison gangs by the Southern Poverty Law Center. Pitcavage has given interviews for radio stations such as KCBS (AM). In 2006, a student radio station at St. Petersburg College interviewed Pitcavage for an episode titled "Militia Movement".

== Bibliography ==
=== Academic journal articles ===
- Ropes of Sand: Territorial Militias, 1801-1812, Journal of the Early Republic, Vol. 13, No. 4, University of Pennsylvania Press (1993) (pp. 481–500)
- Camouflage and Conspiracy: The Militia Movement From Ruby Ridge to Y2K, American Behavioral Scientist, 44, no. 6 (2001): 957-981
