= Red Barricades: ASL Historical Module 1 =

1990 board game

Red Barricades: ASL Historical Module 1 is a board game published in 1990 by Avalon Hill.

== Contents ==
Red Barricades is a game in which an area of Stalingrad is depicted to scale.

== Reception ==
Mike Siggins reviewed Red Barricades for Games International magazine, and gave it a rating of 9 out of 10, and stated that "For non-ASL players this one won't be on the purchase list. For the fans, it's a must buy."

The Chicago Tribune said that "The game includes more than 400 additional counters, a new rules chapter and several campaign games. The Advanced Squad Leader game system requires a serious commitment of time and money and is for specialists only."

== Reviews ==
- Casus Belli #57
