= Multi-Man Publishing =

American wargame publisher

Multi-Man Publishing, LLC ("MMP"), founded in 1994, is a Maryland based game company that publishes many wargame titles, including Advanced Squad Leader and Operational Combat Series.

== History ==
Multi-Man Publishing (MMP) was founded in 1994 by four Avalon Hill playtesters and a graphics art designer. Their first publication was Backblast, a fanzine for Avalon Hill's wargame Advanced Squad Leader (ASL). Around the same time, Avalon Hill had made the decision that ASL did not have a future, and so MMP sought to keep it alive among fans by publishing occasional scenarios and a fanzine. MMP also entered into discussions with AH about purchasing the rights to ASL. In late 1995, professional baseball player Curt Schilling, who was a devoted player of ASL, separately also tried to buy the rights to ASL. Avalon Hill did not agree to either offer, they held out for more money, but introduced Schilling to MMP, who subsequently joined the company as a one-third partner, the other two-thirds owned equally by Perry Cocke and Brian Youse.

After Avalon Hill was sold to Hasbro in 1999, MMP negotiated to license ASL from Hasbro. MMP would also develop, print and sell some of the other former Avalon Hill titles.

In 2002 MMP acquired The Gamers line of wargames, vastly increasing its list of titles including the popular Civil War Brigade Series and Operational Combat Series.

MMP also continued publication of The Gamers' Operations Magazine as a "house organ" similar to Avalon Hill's The General, which had ceased publication with the demise of Avalon Hill. In summer 2011, MMP started a new magazine called Special Ops which replaced Operations as the MMP house organ.

The company is privately owned and thus does not publicly report financial information. Co-owner Brian Youse has stated that the company supports itself solely through the sale of its games, and has done so since 1999.

== Published games ==
Series games

- Advanced Squad Leader
- Area Movement Series
- Battalion Combat Series
- Civil War Brigade Series
- Great Campaigns of the American Civil War
- Grand Tactical Series
- International Game Series
- Line of Battle Series (LoB)
- Napoleonic Brigade Series
- Operational Combat Series
- Panzerblitz 2
- Regimental Sub-Series
- Standard Combat Series
- Tactical Combat Series
- Variable Combat Series
- War Storm Series

Individual games

- Circus Minimus
- Front Toward Enemy
- Lincoln's War
- Shifting Sands
- The Kingdom of Heaven
