= OIS =

OIS may refer to:

== Computing ==
- Object Oriented Input System, a cross-platform input system
- Objective Interface Systems, a communications software and hardware company
- Optical IP Switching, a computer optical network architecture
- Optical image stabilization, a technique to reduce motion-related blurring by an imaging system

== Education ==
- Oxford International School (Panama), an international school in Panama City, Panama
- Oeiras International School, an international school in Oeiras (suburb of Lisbon), Portugal
- Oulu International School, an international school in Oulu, Finland
- Organised Independents (OIs), an interest group within the National Union of Students (UK)
- Oberoi International School, an international school in Mumbai, India
- Oslo International School, an international school in Oslo, Norway
- Orchlon school(Orchlon International School), an international school in Ulaanbaatar, Mongolia

== Other science related ==
- Ops in Surgery, The St George's Surgical Society, an academic society at St George's University
- Oncogene-Induced Senescence, a mechanism in cell biology
- Ocular ischemic syndrome, a medical condition which blocks arterial blood flow to the eye
- Oxygen isotope stages, alternating warm and cool periods in the Earth's paleoclimate
- Outbreak intensity score, a scale to rank tornado outbreaks

== Other ==
- Officer-involved shooting, an incident in which a police officer shoots at another person
- Örgryte IS, a Swedish sports club based in Gothenburg
- Overnight indexed swap, a type of interest rate swap
- Order of Ikhamanga, a South African cultural honour
