= Model K =

Model K might refer to:

- Ford Model K, an upscale automobile introduced in 1906
- Model K (calculator), an early relay binary adder built in 1937
- Harley-Davidson Model K series of motorcycles introduced in 1952
