= Danny Raz =

Professor of Computer Science

- דני רז
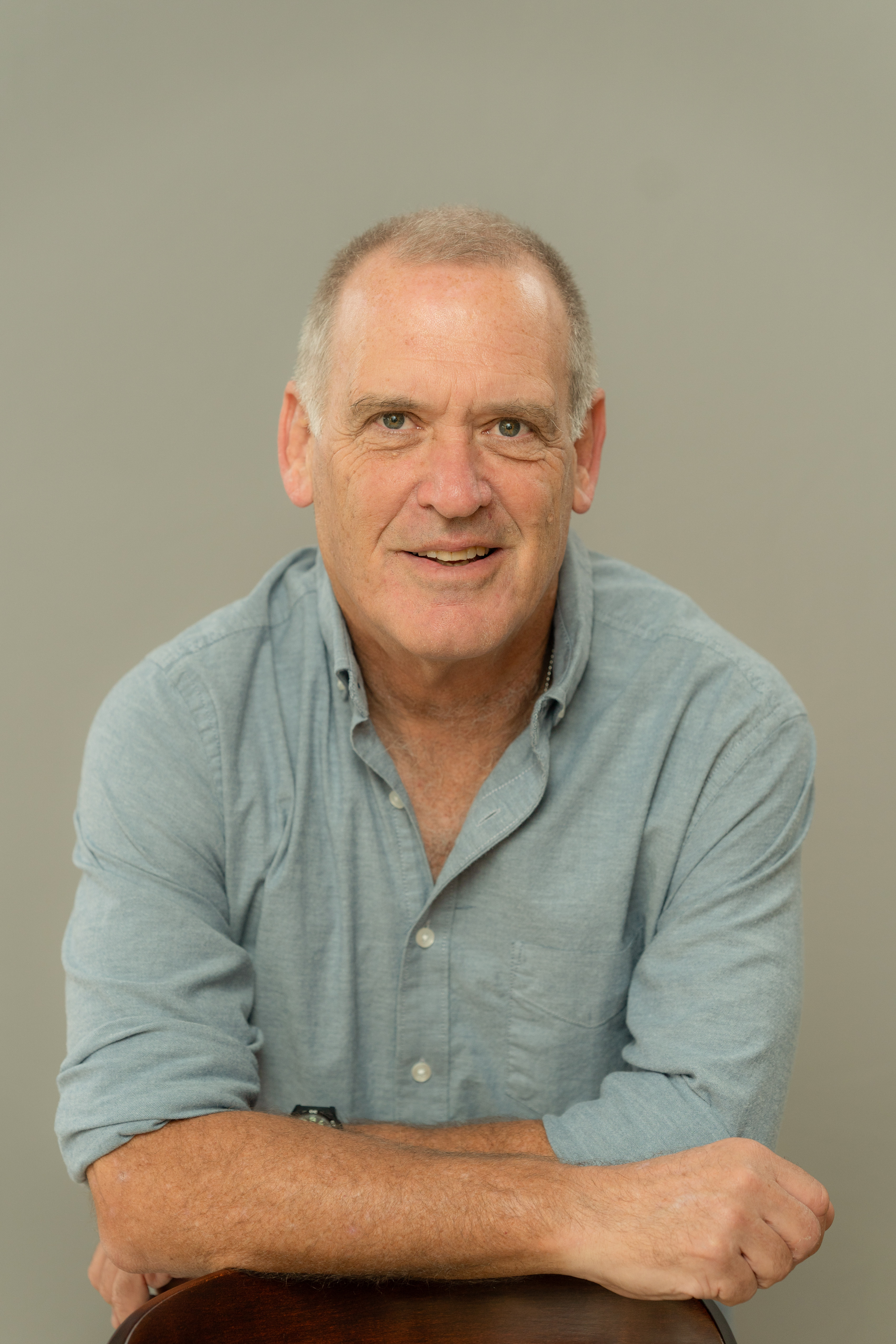
- Born: 1959 (age 66–67)
- Education: Hebrew University, Weizmann Institute of Science
- Awards: Michael Landau Award (Mifal Hapayis Fund) for Young Scientist; 2016 Yanai Prize for Excellence in Academic Education from the Technion
- Scientific career
- Fields: network and system management
- Workplaces: Technion
- Thesis: (1996)
- Doctoral advisor: David Harel

Danny Raz (born 1959; Hebrew: דני רז) is an Israeli computer scientist and a professor of computer science at the Technion – Israel Institute of Technology. He is known for his research on applying theoretical analysis to develop practical and efficient tools for networks and systems management.

Raz is the Senior Executive Vice President of the Technion.

== Academic career ==
Raz received a B.Sc in Physics, Mathematics, and Computer Science from the Hebrew University of Jerusalem (1988). He then obtained both his M.Sc. (1990) and his Ph.D. (1996) from the Weizmann Institute of Science under the supervision of David Harel.

From 1995 to 1997, Raz was a postdoctoral fellow at the International Computer Science Institute (ICSI), in Berkeley California.

Raz joined the computer science department at the Technion in 2000, and became an associate professor in 2005. He was promoted to full professor in 2013.

In 2020 he received the title of Hewlett-Packard Chair in Computer Engineering, and in 2023 he was appointed as Dean of the faculty of computer science. Raz was appointed Senior Executive Vice President of the Technion in October 2025.

Raz has supervised 30 graduate students and authored over 150 scientific publications and 8 patents.

== Research ==
Raz has made contributions in the fields of networking, systems, and cloud computing.

His research includes network management, optimization, and resource allocation in large-scale distributed systems. He has made contributions to software-defined networking, network function virtualization, and self-adaptive network management.

== Professional activities ==
Raz was an associate editor of IEEE Transactions on Network and Service Management (TNSM), IEEE/ACM Transactions on Networking (ToN) and The Journal of Communications and Networks (JCN). He was also a member of the editorial advisory board at The International Journal of Network Management.

Raz was a visiting scientist at Google in Mountain view, California, and from 2017 he is a visiting scientist at Google in Israel.

In 2014, Raz founded the first branch of Bell Labs in Israel, and was its first director until 2017.

== Publications ==
=== Books ===
- Cheng Jin, Sugih Jamin, D. Raz, and Yuval Shavitt, "Building Scalable Internet Services: Theory and Practice", Kluwer Academic Publishers, Boston, 2003.
- D. Raz, Arto Tapani Juhola, Joan Serrat-Fernandez, and Alex Galis, "Fast and Efficient Context-Aware services", WILEY, 2006.
- Dilip Krishnaswamy, Tom Pfeifer, D. Raz (editors), "Real-Time Mobile Multimedia Services: 10th IFIP/IEEE International Conference on Management, of Multimedia and Mobile Networks and Services, MMNS 2007", Springer, Lecture Notes in Computer Science, 2007.
- Dongsu Han, Danny Raz (editors) Proceedings of the ACM SIGCOMM Workshop on Hot topics in Middleboxes and Network Function Virtualization, HotMiddlebox@SIGCOMM 2016, Florianopolis, Brazil, August, 2016.
- Bruno Wassermann, Michal Malka, Vijay Chidambaram, Danny Raz: SYSTOR '21: The 14th ACM International Systems and Storage Conference, Haifa, Israel, June 14–16, 2021. ACM 2021.

== Honors and awards ==
In 1998, Raz received the Michael Landau Award (Mifal Hapayis Fund) for Young Scientist, and in 2016 he won the Yanai Prize for Excellence in Academic Education from the Technion. He has also received several IBM Faculty and Best Paper awards.

== Personal life ==
Raz is married to Orit; they live in Timrat and have four children.
