= Oryx/Pecos =

- Developer: Bell Labs
- OS family: Real-time operating systems
- Working state: Current
- Source model: Closed source
- Supported platforms: Avaya Definity G3 (Generic 3) switches
- Kernel type: Real-time
- License: Proprietary
- Official website: www.avaya.com

Oryx/Pecos is a proprietary operating system developed from scratch by Bell Labs beginning in 1978 for the express purpose of running AT&T's large-scale PBX switching equipment. The operating system was first used with AT&T's flagship System 75, and until very recently, was used in all variations up through and including Definity G3 (Generic 3) switches, now manufactured by AT&T/Lucent Technologies spinoff Avaya. The last system based on Oryx/Pecos was the Avaya G3 CSI running release 13.1 Definity software. The formal end of sale was February 5, 2007. Although widely believed to be a Unix-like variant developed directly by Bell Labs, that is not the case, as it is not based on any version of Unix.

== Description ==
Oryx/Pecos consists of a kernel (Oryx), and the associated processes running on top of it (Pecos). The system is named for Pecos Street, which bounds the Westminster, CO campus of then AT&T's Colorado Bell Labs location, while Oryx was the last word alphabetically before OS in the office dictionary and the Oryx was purportedly the origin of the unicorn myth. The system is loosely based on Thoth (developed at the University of Waterloo) and DEMOS (developed at Los Alamos Scientific Labs).

Features normally found in commercial operating systems are not found in Oryx/Pecos. Such features include:

- A documented API structure
- Dynamic application execution capability where additional applications can be loaded and executed without a need to compile and link them directly to the operating system
- A Disk-Operating System compatible with standard file systems used today
- Dynamically linked libraries
- Memory management for strong separation of applications and operating system processes
- A commercially available development package

There is one historical link between Oryx/Pecos and Unix: the authors of the above article proposed as a future development the implementation of a UNIX execution environment on top of Oryx/Pecos, and in fact, such a project was undertaken at Denver. However, that project never became an official product of AT&T or Lucent, even though it was completed successfully and introduced internally with the "Eli" version of Oryx/Pecos (5th release, or "E" release).

Persons working in large office environments and using AT&T, Lucent Technologies, or Avaya-branded telephones are likely to be using Oxyx-Pecos indirectly, but due to the narrow focus and proprietary nature of the operating system, it remains obscure. In 2005 Avaya discontinued the use of Oryx/Pecos as an operating system in itself, instead porting it to become an application that ran on Linux. The new incarnation is known as Communication Manager. Also in the early 2000s, the Definity One (later IP 600 and the S8100) was an earlier attempt to phase away from the OS. The Definity One ran on Windows NT 4.0 with a Linux emulator that also emulated the Oryx/Pecos system. Allegedly, according to administrators that used that specific system, it was a failure, and the attempt to have Windows run on top Oryx/Pecos and Linux was a problem.

However, due to the robust nature of carrier-grade equipment, and the widespread use of AT&T/Lucent/Avaya PBX systems, Oryx/Pecos will most probably continue to be supported indefinitely.
