= George Stibitz =

American inventor of the digital computer

- Born: April 20, 1904; York, Pennsylvania, U.S.
- Died: January 31, 1995 (aged 90); Hanover, New Hampshire, U.S.
- Education: Cornell University; Union College; Denison University
- Awards: Harry H. Goode Memorial Award (1965); IEEE Emanuel R. Piore Award (1977)

George Robert Stibitz (April 30, 1904 – January 31, 1995) was an American researcher at Bell Labs who is internationally recognized as one of the fathers of the modern digital computer. He was known for his work in the 1930s and 1940s on the realization of Boolean logic digital circuits using electromechanical relays as the switching element.

== Early life and education ==
Stibitz was born in York, Pennsylvania, the son of Mildred Murphy, a math teacher, and George Stibitz, a German Reformed minister and theology professor. Throughout his childhood, Stibitz enjoyed assembling devices and systems, working with material as diverse as a toy Meccano set or the electrical wiring of the family home. He received a bachelor's degree in mathematics from Denison University in Granville, Ohio, a master's degree in physics from Union College in 1927, and a Ph.D. in mathematical physics from Cornell University in 1930 with a thesis entitled "Vibrations of a Non-Planar Membrane."

== Computer ==
Plaque in McNutt Hall at Dartmouth College

Stibitz began working at Bell Labs after his doctorate, where he would remain until 1941. In November 1937 he completed a relay-based adder he later dubbed the "Model K" (after his kitchen table, on which it was purportedly assembled), which calculated using binary addition. Replicas of the "Model K" now reside in the Computer History Museum, the Smithsonian Institution, the William Howard Doane Library at Denison University and the American Computer & Robotics Museum in Bozeman, Montana.

Bell Labs subsequently authorized a full research program in late 1938 with Stibitz at the helm. He led the development of the Complex Number Calculator (CNC), completed in November 1939 and put into operation in 1940. Employing electromagnetic relay binary circuits for its operations, rather than counting wheels or gears, the machine executed calculations on complex numbers. In a demonstration at the meetings of the American Mathematical Society and Mathematical Association of America at Dartmouth College in September 1940, Stibitz used a modified teletype to send commands over telegraph lines to the CNC in New York . This was the first real-time, remote use of a computing machine.

== Wartime activities and subsequent Bell Labs computers ==
After the United States entered World War II in December 1941, Bell Labs became active in developing fire-control devices for the U.S. military. The Labs' most famous invention was the M-9 Gun Director, an ingenious analog device that directed anti-aircraft fire with uncanny accuracy. Stibitz moved to the National Defense Research Committee, an advisory body for the government, but he kept close ties with Bell Labs. For the next several years (1941–1945), with his guidance, the Labs developed relay computers of ever-increasing sophistication. The first of them was used to test the M-9 Gun Director. Later models had more sophisticated capabilities. They had specialized names, but later on, Bell Labs renamed them "Model II", "Model III", etc., and the Complex Computer was renamed the "Model I". All used telephone relays for logic, and paper tape for sequencing and control. The "Model V", was completed in 1946 and was a fully programmable, general-purpose computer, although its relay technology made it slower than the all-electronic computers then under development.

At the end of the war, Stibitz did not return to Bell Labs, but went into private consulting work. From 1964 until his retirement in 1974, Stibitz was a research associate in physiology at the medical school of Dartmouth College.

== Use of the term "digital" ==
In April 1942, Stibitz attended a meeting of a division of the Office of Scientific Research and Development (OSRD), charged with evaluating various proposals for fire-control devices to be used against Axis forces during World War II. Stibitz noted that the proposals fell into two broad categories: "analog" and "pulse". In a memo written after the meeting, he suggested that the term "digital" be used in place of "pulse", as he felt the latter term was insufficiently descriptive of the nature of the processes involved. However, he simultaneously pointed to the limits of this opposition between analog and digital. He presented it as a rather theoretical opposition with no practical use, as most computers of the time would consist of both analog and digital mechanisms.

== Awards ==
- Harry H. Goode Memorial Award in 1965 (together with Konrad Zuse)
- IEEE Emanuel R. Piore Award –
  1977 "For pioneering contributions to the development of computers, utilizing binary and floating-point arithmetic, memory indexing, operation from a remote console, and program-controlled computations."
- IEEE's Computer Pioneer Award, 1982
- election to the National Academy of Engineering, 1981
- election to the National Inventors Hall of Fame, 1985

Stibitz held 38 patents, in addition to those he earned at Bell Labs. He became a member of the faculty at Dartmouth College in 1964 to build bridges between the fields of computing and medicine, and retired from research in 1983.

== Computer art ==
In his later years, Stibitz "turned to non-verbal uses of the computer". Specifically, he used a Commodore-Amiga to create computer art. In a 1990 letter, written to the department chair of the Mathematics and Computer Science department of Denison University he said:

I have turned to non-verbal uses of the computer, and have made a display of computer "art". The quotes are obligatory, for the result of my efforts is not to create important art but to show that this activity is fun, much as the creation of computers was fifty years ago.

The Mathematics and Computer Science department at Denison University has enlarged and displayed some of his artwork.

== Publications ==
- Stibitz, George Robert (1943-01-12) [1941-11-26]. "Binary counter". Patent USA 2307868. (4 pages)
- Stibitz, George Robert (1954-02-09) [1941-04-19]. "Complex Computer". Patent US2668661A. (102 pages)
- Stibitz, George; Larrivee, Jules A. (1957). Mathematics and Computers. New York: McGraw-Hill.

== See also ==
- List of pioneers in computer science
- John Vincent Atanasoff
- Gray code (reflected binary code)
- Gray–Stibitz code (Gray excess-3 code)
- Stibitz code (excess-3 code)
