= Peter Vetter =

Bell Labs Research Head

- Peter Vetter in 2025
- Scientific career
- Fields: Telecommunications research

Peter Vetter is a telecommunications researcher who served as president of Nokia Bell Labs Core Research from 2021 to 2026, sharing leadership of Bell Labs with Thierry Klein after the two succeeded Marcus Weldon. As president, he led approximately 450 researchers, with Bell Labs pursuing work in 6G communications, artificial intelligence, and quantum computing. He was elected an IEEE Fellow in 2022 for leadership in broadband access technologies in advanced passive optical networks.

His research has focused on broadband access networks, including passive optical networks, and on next-generation communications systems.

Vetter is also a Bell Labs Fellow and was named honorary professor by the Faculty of Engineering Science at KU Leuven in 2022.

== Education and career ==
Vetter received an engineering degree in physics from Ghent University in 1986 and a doctorate in 1991. After a postdoctoral fellowship at Tohoku University in Japan, he joined Alcatel's research center in Antwerp in 1993.

Vetter co-founded an internal venture that developed Alcatel's first fiber-to-the-home product in 2000. He moved to Bell Labs in Murray Hill, New Jersey, in 2009 and joined its senior leadership team in 2013. Before his appointment as president of Core Research, he led the Access & Device Research Lab.

From 2003 to 2007, he was the principal project lead of MUSE.

== Research ==
Vetter's publications include work on passive optical network (PON) systems and energy efficiency in optical access. He co-authored a 2013 conference paper describing a time- and wavelength-set division multiplexing PON demonstration. In 2014, he and colleagues published a review of energy-saving approaches for optical access networks, including sleep modes, bit interleaving, and reductions in component power consumption.

As president of Core Research, Vetter oversaw work on network architecture, security, optical communications, and mobile radio systems.
