= Model V =

Early electromechanical general purpose computer

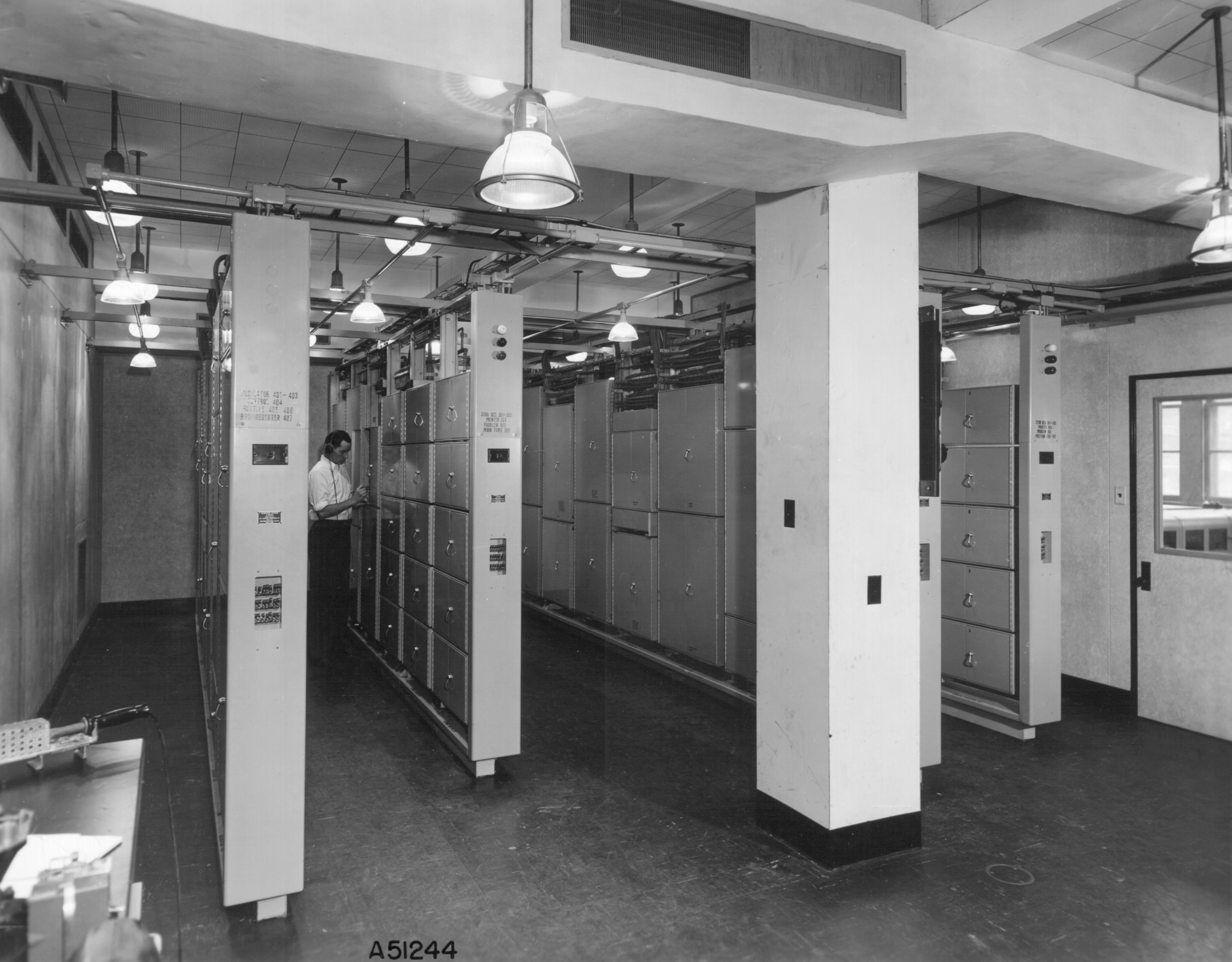
Relay equipment room of the Model V Computer installed at BRL

The Model V was among the early electromechanical general purpose computers, designed by George Stibitz and built by Bell Telephone Laboratories and became operational in 1946.

Only two machines were built: first one was installed at National Advisory Committee for Aeronautics (NACA, later NASA), the second (1947) at the US Army’s Ballistic Research Laboratory (BRL).

== Construction ==
Design was started in 1944. The tape-controlled (Harvard architecture) machine had two (design allowed for a total of six) processors ("computers") that could operate independently, an early form of multiprocessing.

The Model V weighed about 10 short tons (9.1 t).

== Significance ==
- Inspired Richard Hamming to investigate the automatic error-correction, which led to invention of Hamming codes
- One of the early electromechanical general purpose computers
- First American machine and first George Stibitz design to use floating-point arithmetic
- Had an early form of multiprocessing
- Had a very primitive form of an operating system, albeit in hardware. A separate hardware control unit existed to direct the sequence of computer operations.

== Model VI ==
Built and used internally by Bell Telephone Laboratories, operational in 1949.

Simplified version of the Model V (only one processor, about half the relays) but with several improvements, including one of the earliest use of the microcode.

== Bibliography ==
- Research, United States Office of Naval (1953). A survey of automatic digital computers. Models V and VI. Office of Naval Research, Dept. of the Navy. pp. 9–10 (in reader: 15–16).
- "The relay computers at Bell Labs : those were the machines, part 2". Datamation. The relay computers at Bell Labs : those were the machines, parts 1 and 2 | 102724647 | Computer History Museum. part 2: pp. 47, 49. May 1967.
- Irvine, M. M. (July 2001). "Early digital computers at Bell Telephone Laboratories". IEEE Annals of the History of Computing. 23 (3): 25–27. doi:10.1109/85.948904. ISSN 1058-6180. pdf
- Kaisler, Stephen H. (2016). "Chapter Three: Stibitz's Relay Computers". Birthing the Computer: From Relays to Vacuum Tubes. Cambridge Scholars Publishing. pp. 35–37. ISBN 9781443896313.
- "Г. – Bell Labs – Model V" [G. – Bell Labs – Model V]. oplib.ru (in Russian). Archived from the original on September 29, 2022.
