= Model K (calculator) =

The Model K was an early 1-bit electromechanical binary adder built in November 1937 by Bell Labs scientist George Stibitz as a proof of concept, using scrap relays and metal strips from a tin can. The "K" in "Model K" came from "kitchen table", upon which he assembled it. It would later become the basis for the technology of the Model I Calculator.

Stibitz created the Model K after being asked to investigate the magnetic behaviour of relays, realising the on & off conditions behaved the same way as digits in binary.

It included batteries, two flashlight bulbs as output, and two switches made from metal from a tobacco can. The reaction to the model in Bell Labs was amusement.

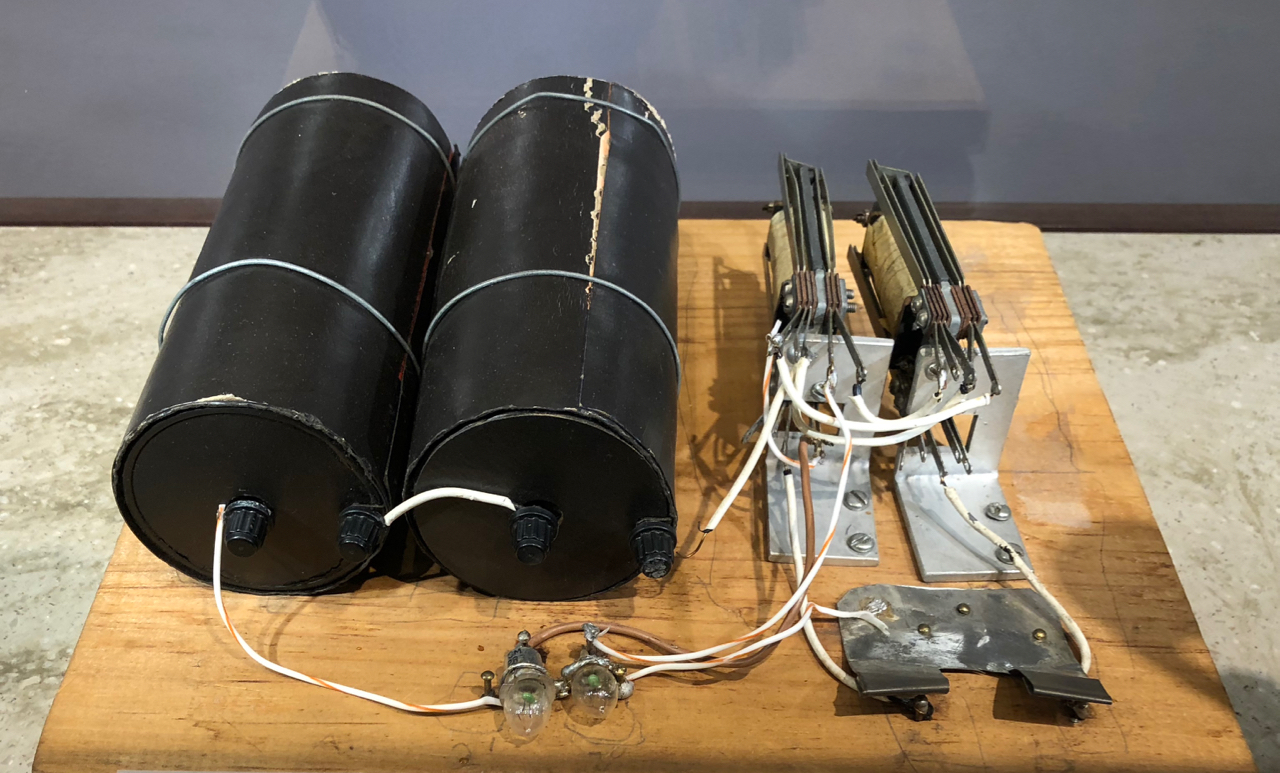
A replica of the Model K created in 1980
