= Object Oriented Input System =

Software library

- Developers: Wrecked Games (pjcast), then the community
- Stable release: 1.5.1 / 13 May 2021; 4 years ago
- Repository: github.com/wgois/OIS
- Platform: Cross-platform
- Type: Input/Games/Entertainment
- License: zlib/libpng license
- Website: wgois.github.com/OIS/

OIS (Object-Oriented Input System) is a code library for constructing a human–computer interface with input devices such as a keyboard, mouse or game controller. OIS is designed so that software developers can easily use input from these devices with a computer application.

== General information ==
The Object-Oriented Input Library is a mostly C++ library for handling input. Input types include mouse, keyboard, joystick and Wii remote.

OIS is meant to be cross-platform, supporting Windows and Linux systems. OS X and FreeBSD are only partially supported.

== Features ==
OIS uses an object-oriented design.

Various types of input including mouse, keyboard, joystick and Wii Remote are supported.

OIS can handle force feedback devices.
