= Marcus Weldon =

Businessman

- Born: July 25, 1968 (age 58); United Kingdom
- Education: King's College London (BS); Harvard University (PhD)
- Awards: Wayne B. Nottingham Prize New Jersey Medal for Science and Technology
- Scientific career
- Fields: Physical Chemistry, Computer Science
- Workplaces: Bell Labs
- Doctoral advisor: Cynthia Friend

Marcus Weldon (born 25 July 1968) was the 13th president of Bell Labs. He also served as the Corporate Chief Technology Officer of Nokia.

== Education ==
Weldon won a scholarship (bursary) to the Bedford Modern School, which he attended until the age of 18, excelling in mathematics and the sciences before enrolling at King's College London to study Chemistry and Computer Science. He graduated with First Class honours in 1990, and was accepted to the Ph.D. program at Harvard University in Cambridge, Massachusetts, where he studied Physical Chemistry and performed research into the growth of diamond films on metallic surfaces with Cynthia Friend. He was awarded the Nottingham Prize for his thesis work.

== Career ==
In 1995, he accepted a post doctoral position at Bell Labs in Murray Hill, working in the group of Yves Chabal, in the Physical Sciences research laboratory, headed by Horst Stormer. He studied the surface oxidation of silicon and the science of wafer bonding and splitting by hydrogen implantation, winning multiple awards for his work. He was offered a position as a Member of Technical Staff in the Materials Research laboratory run by Alastair Glass, working for Mark Cardillo to study the microscopic physics and chemistry of sol-gel.

After the spin-out of Lucent Technologies from AT&T, and the sale of the optical fiber business to Commscope, he changed focus to investigate early Fiber To The Home technologies and architectures. This led to his subsequent appointment as Chief Technology Officer of the Broadband Solutions business unit of Lucent Technologies in 2004, and with one area of focus being broadband economics and quality of service. After the merger between Alcatel SA and Lucent Technologies in 2006, he became the CTO of the Broadband Access business unit of the combined entity, before becoming the Corporate CTO for Alcatel-Lucent in 2009. He assumed the role of CTO for Nokia following its acquisition of Alcatel-Lucent in 2016.

In 2013, after the departure of Jeong Kim, he became the 13th President of Bell Labs, in addition to his continued role as CTO of Alcatel-Lucent. During his roles as CTO and Bell Labs President he has engaged in numerous industry leadership activities such as the FCC's Open Internet Advisory Committee and the launch of the European Union's Partnership for 5G Wireless Research. He has focused on the rejuvenation of Bell Labs and a return to its pre-eminence by the invention of foundational networking technologies and systems for the ‘cloud networking’ era, via 10x game-changing research and so-called ‘FutureX’ projects. In 2014 under his tenure the Bell Labs Prize was inaugurated to encourage external innovators to collaborate with Bell Labs’ researchers.

Weldon was named as one of Global Telecoms Business Power 100 in 2014, and one of Global Telecoms Business 50 CTOs to watch in 2015. In November 2016 he was awarded the New Jersey Medal for Science and Technology for his technology vision and leadership.

In April 2016, he relaunched the series of collaborations between Bell Labs scientists and artists known as Experiments in Art and Technology, using the concept of a Human Digital Orchestra as an expression of the strong interplay between the artistic and the digital-network domains that allows the audience to interact with, and modify, artistic performances and installations.

The new E.A.T initiative has on-going collaborations with the digital music artist Beatie Wolfe, exploring the interplay of digital and physical, as well as a partnership with New Museum's incubator, New Inc., named EXPLOR after the pioneering work of computer artist Lillian Schwartz and Bell Labs software engineer, Ken Knowlton.

In November 2020, he announced his intent to step down as the President of Bell Labs at the end of March 2021, and likened the transition to the 'regeneration' of Doctors in Doctor Who.

Since 2021, he has been an advisor to multiple companies on their Artificial Intelligence strategies. In 2022, he was awarded the Neil Armstrong Visiting Professorship at Purdue University, teaching a graduate course in Innovation Strategies and AI. In 2025, he was named as the Contributing Editor for AI at Newsweek, authoring a series of influential articles on the nature of human and artificial intelligence and the anticipated utility of AI systems to augment or automate human tasks, and the resultant impact on productivity and society.

== Personal life ==
He is married to Cherie Weldon (née Macauley) and has five children. He resides in Summit, New Jersey.

== Books ==
- M.K. Weldon and Bell Labs Research, CTO, and Consulting Staff, The Future X Network: A Bell Labs Perspective. CRC Press, 2015. ISBN 978-1498759267
