= Journal of Communications and Networks =

- Discipline: Engineering, Computer science
- Language: English

Publication details
- Former names: International Journal of Digital & Analog Cabled Systems
- History: 1999–present
- Publisher: Korean Information and Communications Society/IEEE
- Frequency: Bimonthly

Standard abbreviations
- ISO 4: J. Commun. Netw.

Indexing
- ISSN: 1229-2370 (print); 1976-5541 (web)

Links
- Journal homepage

The Journal of Communications and Networks, formerly known as the International Journal of Digital & Analog Cabled Systems) is a scientific journal published by the Korean Information and Communications Society and technically cosponsored by the IEEE Communications Society. The journal is published six times a year, and focuses on communication theory and techniques, communications systems, and information networks.
