= Orchlon International School =

International school in Khan-Uul, Ulaanbaatar, Mongolia

Coordinates: 47.9238°N 106.9299°E

Orchlon International School and Kindergarten Complex (OIS) is a non-profit, private, co-educational college-preparatory day school located in Khan Uul District, Ulaanbaatar, Mongolia. The school offers an international education program from kindergarten through Grade 12, delivering both national and international curricula in English and Mongolian.

Founded in 2001, Orchlon International School serves approximately 2,000 students and is among the earliest institutions in Mongolia to adopt internationally benchmarked academic programs. A significant proportion of its graduates continue their higher education abroad, enrolling in universities in the United States, the United Kingdom, Australia, Singapore, and China.

In 2007, Orchlon International School was recognized by the Ministry of Education and Science of Mongolia as the “Best Secondary School of Mongolia” for its academic program, learning environment, and teaching quality.

== Curriculum ==
Orchlon International School is a bilingual institution, with instruction delivered in both English and Mongolian. The school follows the Cambridge Pathway curriculum and is authorized to offer international programs and qualifications from early years through upper secondary education.

The school provides:

Cambridge International Primary Programme (Grades 1–5)

Cambridge Lower Secondary Programme (Grades 6–8)

Cambridge International General Certificate of Secondary Education (IGCSE) (Grades 9–10)

Cambridge AS and A Level programmes (Grades 11–12)

In July 2008, Orchlon became the first school in Mongolia to implement the Cambridge Pathway across all age groups, from approximately age 5 to 19. Through this framework, students are assessed against international standards used in thousands of schools worldwide.

== Academic focus ==
Since its establishment, Orchlon International School has placed particular emphasis on mathematics, science, and analytical thinking. Students have regularly participated in national and international academic competitions, including mathematics and science Olympiads, earning awards and recognition.

The school’s academic approach focuses on preparing students for university study through inquiry-based learning, problem solving, and international assessment frameworks.

== Reputation and achievements ==
Orchlon International School is widely regarded as a pioneer of international education in Mongolia. By offering both national and international qualifications within a single institution, the school has contributed to expanding access to globally recognized education pathways for Mongolian students.

The school is also noted for its long-term engagement in curriculum development, teacher training, and international collaboration, supporting Mongolia’s integration into global education networks.

== See also ==
Education in Mongolia
