= Optical IP switching =

Optical IP switching (OIS) is a novel method of creating transparent optical connections between network nodes using a flow-based approach. An IP flow is a collection of IP packets going from the same source to the same destination; the exchange of IP packets is the mechanism that allows the transport of information over the internet.

Recent studies have shown that Internet traffic presents a heavy tail distribution, where a small number of flows carry a large amount of data. This suggests the possibility of dynamically adapting the optical connections to carry these heavy flows.

A packet has to traverse a certain number of routers before reaching its destination where the network routers must analyze each packet and forward it towards the direction of the destination node. Since a flow is defined as a sequence of packets going from the same source to the same destination, if the router recognizes the flow it could create a short-cut by creating a “switched” connection allowing all the packets belonging to the same IP flow to proceed directly towards the correct direction without being analyzed one after the other. This general idea is known as IP switching.

When this shortcut occurs at an optical level, the process becomes optical IP switching. Packets that are transmitted optically between two points have to be converted into electrical signal at a routing station then routed and converted back into optical to continue their travel over the optical fiber. With OIS, If the router is able to recognize a flow, it could create a shortcut (“cut-through connection”) directly at the optical level, and all the packets belonging to the same flow could be directed to the right destination without the optical-to-electrical conversion process. This would save time, energy, memory and processing resources on the router.

A basic implementation of the OIS concept sees an optical router that monitors IP traffic and if a flow appears with specific characteristics the router establishes an optical cut-through path between its upstream and downstream neighbors, requesting the upstream node to place all the packets belonging to the flow into the new path. The newly generated trail bypasses the IP layer of the router, as the packets transparently flow from the upstream to the downstream neighbor. Following a similar procedure, the path can then be extended to more than three nodes, but this decision is always autonomously taken by each router and depends on the traffic encountered and on the resources locally available. Since an optical link can carry several gigabits of data per second, it may be difficult to find a flow that alone can exploit the bandwidth offered by an optical trail. For this reason, aggregating more IP flows into the same dedicated path is essential for the performance of an OIS network. The aggregation introduces a trade-off between the number of IP flows that can be aggregated together and the length of the optical trail that accommodates them. In order to achieve good performance only optical flows sharing a significant number of network hops should be aggregated into the same path. A core node implementing optical IP switching must be endowed with electrical processing and memory resources (as a standard IP router), a variable number of optical transceivers and an optical switching element (usually a MEMS based device). An edge node does not need an optical switching device because it can only function as source or destination of the optical flow.

The control protocol nearest to OIS is GMPLS, which is being standardized by the IETF. GMPLS aims at creating end-to-end connections after an explicit request from a customer or a network engineering service. This constitutes the main difference with OIS where the optical trials are automatically triggered by the encountered traffic; they are initially generated between three adjacent nodes, and then extended following a distributed decision.
